= List of origamists =

An origamist or an origamian is a person who is associated with the art of origami. Some notable origamists / origamians are:

== A ==
- Jay Ansill – composer and folk musician who also wrote The Origami Sourcebook

== D ==
- Martin Demaine and Erik Demaine – father-and-son team who manipulate flat paper into swirling forms.

== E ==
- Peter Engel – author of several origami books including Origami from Angelfish to Zen, 10-Fold Origami: Fabulous Paperfolds You Can Make in Just 10 Steps!, and Origami Odyssey

== F ==
- Tomoko Fuse (布施 知子) – famous for boxes and unit origami

== G ==
- Ilan Garibi – Israeli origami artist and designer
- Alice Gray – co-founder of the non-profit Friends of the Origami Center in New York

== H ==
- Robert Harbin – popularised origami in Britain; also presented a series of short programmes entitled Origami, made by Thames Television for ITV
- Jacob Hashimoto – created a large-scale paper mobile at Mary Boone Gallery
- David A. Huffman – American electrical engineer
- Tom Hull – American mathematics professor
- Humiaki Huzita – formulated the first six of the Huzita–Hatori axioms

== J ==
- Eric Joisel – French wet-folder renowned for his lifelike masks, including those of fellow origami enthusiasts

== K ==
- Satoshi Kamiya – one of the youngest geniuses of the origami field (born 1981)
- Kunihiko Kasahara – devised a standardized method for creating many modular polyhedra
- Toshikazu Kawasaki – Japanese mathematician famous for his Iso-area folding theory and his many geometric folds, including Kawasaki's "Rose"
- Marc Kirschenbaum – known for his instrumentalist designs

== L ==
- Robert J. Lang – author of many Origami books including the new benchmark Origami Design Secrets; formerly a laser physicist at NASA before quitting in 2001 and committing to origami full-time
- David Lister – founding member of the British Origami Society

== M ==
- Sipho Mabona – Swiss and South African origami master who created a life-size elephant from a single piece of paper.
- Jun Maekawa – software engineer, mathematician, and origami artist known for popularizing the method of utilizing crease patterns in designing origami models
- Matthew T. Mason – American roboticist who developed the first origami folding robot, demonstrating advances in difficult manipulation tasks
- Ligia Montoya – Argentine paper-folder who played a crucial role in establishing paper-folding as an international movement
- John Montroll – probably the most prolific Western artist and author of over 40 books on origami
- Jeannine Mosley – best known for her origami models created from business cards, including the Menger Sponge. She has developed mathematical techniques for designing and analyzing curved origami models.

== O ==
- Lillian Rose Vorhaus Kruskal Oppenheimer – American origami pioneer whose birthday (October 24) is one of the World Origami Days.

== R ==
- Samuel Randlett – helped design and popularize the Yoshizawa-Randlett diagramming system
- Nick Robinson – professional British origami artist and author of over fifty books on origami

== S ==
- James Sakoda – author of Modern Origami
- Jeremy Shafer – professional entertainer and origamist based in Berkeley, California

== T ==
- Florence Temko – pioneer in spreading origami in the United States
- Norio Torimoto – Japanese origami artist based in Sweden since the 1970s

== U ==
- Kōshō Uchiyama – Sōtō priest, origami master, and abbot of Antai-ji near Kyoto, Japan, and author of more than twenty books on Zen Buddhism and origami
- Miguel de Unamuno – Spanish essayist, novelist, poet, playwright and philosopher who devised many new models and popularized origami in Spain and South America.

== Y ==
- Makoto Yamaguchi – Chairperson of Origami House
- Akira Yoshizawa – reinvented modern origami and created the modern repertoire of folding symbols
