= Lillian Oppenheimer =

American origami artist (1898–1992)

- Born: Lillian Rose Vorhaus; October 24, 1898; New York City, U.S.
- Died: July 24, 1992 (aged 93); New York City, U.S.
- Other name: Lillian Vorhaus Kruskal
- Years active: 1953–1992
- Organization: The Friends of the Origami Center of America (co-founder)
- Known for: Popularizing origami in the U.S. Establishing the term origami in English
- Spouse(s): Joseph Kruskal (m. 1918; died 1949) Harry Oppenheimer (m. 1954; died 1962)
- Children: 5, including William, Martin and Joseph Kruskal

Lillian Vorhaus Oppenheimer (née Lillian Rose Vorhaus, formerly Lillian Vorhaus Kruskal; October 24, 1898 – July 24, 1992) was an American origami pioneer from New York City. During the latter half of her life, Oppenheimer became a leading figure in origami and is credited with popularizing the art form in the United States. She adopted the Japanese word origami because she liked the sound of it and felt like the English term paper folding was too vague. Origami eventually became the more common name.

In 1928, Oppenheimer entertained her sick daughter with an origami book. She picked origami up again as a hobby in 1953. After reading Robert Harbin's Paper Magic (1956), Oppenheimer stopped thinking of origami only as a pastime and began to consider it an art form in its own right. She began to teach origami professionally and corresponded with prominent paper folders, including Akira Yoshizawa of Japan and Ligia Montoya of Argentina. In 1958, The New York Times ran an article on Oppenheimer which gave origami more publicity in the U.S. than ever before.

To capitalize on the attention, Oppenheimer started holding regular lessons in New York City and dubbed her informal group "the Origami Center". It became the center of a new American school of origami. In 1980, Oppenheimer and her colleagues established The Friends of The Origami Center of America, a nonprofit sister organization. The Friends were renamed OrigamiUSA in 1994 and is the main origami organization in the United States, with numerous regional branches.

== Early life and first marriage ==
Lillian Rose Vorhaus was born on October 24, 1898, in Manhattan, New York City, to Bernand Vorhaus and Mollie Grossman. She was a Jew of Austrian, Hungarian, Czech, and Polish ancestry. Her father, Bernand, was a non-practicing attorney who immigrated from Poland and made a living importing furs. Her mother was born in the United States. (Note: One source states that she was born in St. Louis, Missouri, and another states that she was born in New York City.)

On October 11, 1918, Lillian married Joseph Bernard Kruskal (1885–1949). Joseph was also Jewish, and he owned a wholesale fur clothing firm with his brother. Living in New Rochelle, New York, they had five children—William, Molly, Rosaly, Martin, and Joseph—between 1919 and 1928. Lillian's husband was irritated by her desire to join him in business, believing that she should pursue activities "[more] appropriate for a suburban matron". Although Lillian enjoyed raising their children, the marriage was troubled and ultimately ended in divorce.

In 1928, Lillian's seven-year-old daughter, Molly, had to be operated on after developing severe meningitis. To entertain Molly during her recovery, Lillian read Fun with Paperfolding (1928) with her and made some of the models in the book. Written by the magicians William D. Murray and Francis J. Rigney, Fun with Paperfolding was one of the earliest instructional books on paper folding, (Note: Dover Publications republished Fun with Paperfolding in 1960 as Paper Folding for Beginners; it is currently in print as Fun with Paper Folding and Origami. Although the origami historian David Lister wrote that it was the first English-language book "solely devoted to recreational paperfolding", the British paperfolder Nick Robinson considered the Fröbelian books to be earlier.) which is now better known as origami. Because the book's instructions were difficult to understand, Lillian did not learn the more complicated pieces. After Molly recovered, Lillian did not do origami for many years.

In 1948, Lillian was visiting Joseph at the hospital and befriended Florence Temko, who was visiting her husband. Lillian took Temko to the hospital's craft shop, where they made woolly animals to pass the time. They continued this even after Joseph and Temko's husband had recovered and were able to sell them. Lillian and Temko remained friends, and Temko visited her every week until Joseph died in 1949 or 1950. (Note: He died in 1949 or 1950.) After Joseph's death, Lillian enjoyed acting as materfamilias to her children and grandchildren.

== Career ==
=== Starting paper folding ===
At a family meeting c. 1950, (Note: The exact date is not known. Nick Robinson wrote that it was "about 1953".) Lillian Kruskal was reintroduced to paper folding by Isaac Kramer, the stepfather of her daughter-in-law. (Note: Kramer's wife was the mother of Laura Kruskal, the wife of Lillian's son, Martin David Kruskal. Laura's mother remarried after her first husband died.) Kramer made for them the Flapping Bird, a model which flapped its wings when its tail was pulled. Kruskal asked Kramer how to make her own Flapping Bird, but he said that he lacked the ability to teach it to others.

In 1953, Kruskal attended an adult education class at the New School for Social Research, in which she used salvaged materials to create handicrafts. When her teacher, Emily Rosenthal, showed the class how to make the Flapping Bird, Kruskal recognized it as the same model that Kramer had made. She asked Rosenthal to teach her more paper folding models. Rosenthal referred her to another student, Frieda Lourie, who Rosenthal thought would be better able to help her.

Kruskal and Lourie became friends, but it turned out that Lourie could not, in fact, teach her anything new. However, Kruskal and Lourie set out to learn new models and, with the help of Kruskal's copy of Fun with Paperfolding, began teaching others how to fold them. After learning the art from Kruskal, Kruskal's family grew to love paper folding just as she did. She sent her copy of Fun with Paperfolding to Tom, her grandson, after he folded fifty paper cups for her friends. Kruskal also taught paper folding to her friends. Temko, who she introduced to paper folding, became a prolific author of books on the subject.

In 1954, Lillian Kruskal married Harry Centennial Oppenheimer (1889–1962). Harry was the founder and president of Brand & Oppenheimer, Inc., a leading textile business, and a civic leader; he was also a director at the New School for Social Research. Harry was remarrying after the death of his first wife; Lillian had four stepsons by him named Peter, Jack, Phillip and Herbert. After getting married, the two moved to a penthouse apartment at the Hotel Irving in Gramercy Park, New York City. Harry was supportive of Lillian's activities and they had many shared interests, including music. She accompanied him when he traveled for frequent business-related meetings and found paper folding a convenient pastime while waiting.

=== From a hobby to a career ===
At the start of 1957, Lillian Oppenheimer received a copy of Robert Harbin's Paper Magic (1956) from her son William. Harbin conducted extensive research for the book. It included an introduction with a lengthy history of paper folding in Japan and Europe, an analysis of common techniques, instructions for most of the models known in the Western world, and a bibliography. Gershon Legman informed him about the paper folding traditions in Japan and Spain, where the more inventive models were being created. The British origami historian David Lister considered Paper Magic the "first time that anyone had written about paperfolding in such a comprehensive way." It was a systematic treatment of paper folding that viewed it as a form of art rather than a children's game.

Before she read Paper Magic, Oppenheimer saw paper folding as just a hobby, one that was usually enjoyed alone. However, the book gave her a different view of paper folding: a distinct art form, and a movement whose followers actively communicated with each other. Oppenheimer wanted to get into contact with other followers of this movement. After visiting Harbin in Britain in the summer of 1957, she began exchanging letters with other paper folders, including Gershon Legman in France, Akira Yoshizawa in Japan, and Ligia Montoya in Argentina.

Oppenheimer was interested in origami for recreation. She would acquaint herself with other practitioners and steadily learned more about the art. In contrast, her paper folding partner Lourie, a therapist at Bellevue Hospital, used it for her patients. On Lourie's suggestion, the two began teaching origami to those who were interested—from groups at the Red Cross, Boy Scouts and Girl Scouts to nursing home residents—and they started doing origami professionally. At the Hotel Irving, where Oppenheimer lived, Lourie moved into a studio where she could hold lessons.

=== Use of the word origami ===
Around this time, Oppenheimer began using the Japanese word origami (折り紙, lit. 'to fold paper') instead of the English term paper folding. She was attracted to the Japanese word because she thought the English term paper folding was "uninteresting" and too easily confused with other paper crafts. She also considered the Mandarin term (折纸, Pinyin: zhé zhǐ), but ultimately found it unappealing and difficult to pronounce. The exact time that Oppenheimer adopted the word origami is unclear. She said that when she visited Harbin, the two were still referring to their art form as paper folding. By 1958, Oppenheimer was consistently using the word origami. It was by the Japanese name that she introduced her art form to Americans on her future radio and television appearances.

Due to Oppenheimer's efforts to promote origami, which eventually culminated in the Origami Center, the Japanese word origami usurped paper folding as the dominant name in the English-speaking world and became recognised internationally. Nick Robinson, a former president of the British Origami Society, claimed that origami has been established in the English language since 1958, while a Japanese researcher named Yoshinobu Miyamoto reported that the frequency of origami in literature surpassed that of paper folding c. 1960.

=== Wider attention ===
Why should the Japanese have all the fun?

— Lillian Oppenheimer

Lourie wanted to approach newspapers and museums. In contrast, Oppenheimer did not believe in seeking out publicity, and thought that attention would come in due time. Lourie managed to get three articles published in Hokubei Shimpo, an English-language newspaper for Japanese expatriates in New York, but they attracted little attention. The concert pianist Sylvia Rabinof, one of Oppenheimer's closest friends, knew the journalist Meyer Berger, who wrote the popular column "About New York" for The New York Times. Oppenheimer was initially reluctant, but she allowed Rabinof to send the Hokubei Shimpo articles to Berger.

To Oppenheimer's surprise, Berger soon called back to meet with her and get material for a new column. On June 27, 1958, The New York Times printed Berger's column on Oppenheimer. It outlined the history of origami and described some of Oppenheimer's favorite action models, including the Flapping Bird. The article received unexpected attention from the public, which led to Oppenheimer being interviewed on Tonight Starring Jack Paar. This in turn enabled her to make further appearances on appearances on radio and television. Through Oppenheimer, origami became more well known to Americans than it had ever been before.

Oppenheimer used the newfound publicity to organize monthly origami lessons at the Japan Society headquarters in Manhattan. Twenty-five people, included Temko and Lourie, attended the first lesson on October 6, 1958. Many of them would become members of what she dubbed "the Origami Center". The lessons soon came into such demand—aided by another mention in Berger's column—that Oppenheimer started additional weekly lessons on Tuesdays and extended their run. She also started a newsletter for the Center called The Origamian. When the Japan Society's headquarters became unavailable, Oppenheimer continued the monthly lessons in a nearby church and then held weekly lessons in her apartment, which came to an end in March 1959. Robinson later wrote that, for the first time, origami had its own "centre of activity".

After the lessons ended, Oppenheimer and her husband went on a world tour. After traveling extensively in Europe, Lillian went to Japan to meet Akira Yoshizawa, who was considered "the preeminent folder of his time". The meeting was covered internationally and the pair even appeared on Japanese television. However, on that first night in Japan, Oppenheimer was informed that her brother had died. She and her husband took the first flight back to New York City. When they returned to their apartment in the Hotel Irving, they learned that Lourie had also died that morning, having fallen off the roof of the hotel.

Although both incidents affected her deeply, Oppenheimer carried on with her work and contributed to an exhibit at the Cooper Union Museum. "Plane Geometry and Fancy Figures", the first origami exhibit in the United States, ran at the museum in May 1959. Although its focus was on Yoshizawa's art, the exhibit also featured the work of American folders who Oppenheimer had discovered. In addition, the exhibit included material on the history and mathematics of origami, which piqued the interest of both artists and academics. Meanwhile, the Origami Center became the center of a new American school of folders. One of the early works to come from this group, Sam Randlett's The Art of Origami (1961), gave prominence to Oppenheimer and her Center.

Oppenheimer's husband died on March 7, 1962. His will dictated that she would receive one third of his estate and the associated income for life through a trust fund. She moved to the Manhattan neighborhood of Greenwich Village afterwards.

=== The Friends of The Origami Center of America ===
Despite the end of Oppenheimer's lessons in 1959, the Origami Center continued as an informal organization held together by Oppenheimer. According to Robinson, "[to] be Lillian's friend was to automatically be a member." Members of the new American school it had produced included George Rhoads, James Sakoda, Robert Neale, and Sam Randlett, all of whom were Oppenheimer's acquaintances and kept in close correspondence with each other. Meanwhile, Oppenheimer accumulated a large collection of origami and started a business which sold origami books.

After Michael Shall and Alice Gray proposed a formal sister organization to the Center, Oppenheimer, Shall, Gray, and their colleagues established The Friends of The Origami Center of America. The nonprofit company was incorporated in 1980 or 1981. When Gray retired, the Friends were able to continue using her office at the American Museum of Natural History and they slowly subsumed the Center's functions. They purchased Lillian's supplies business in 1987.

== Death and legacy ==
Akira Yoshizawa in Japan and Ligia Montoya in Argentine [sic] had explored new techniques of folding; Gershon Legman, [sic] had done extensive research; Robert Harbin had written the book [Paper Magic]. But without more, paperfolding might still have withered and relapsed into obscurity once more. Paperfolding required someone with the energy, enthusiasm and charisma needed to present it to the world for what it was now revealed to be. That person was Lillian Oppenheimer.

— David Lister, British origami historian

Lillian Vorhaus Oppenheimer died on July 24, 1992, at the Beth Israel Medical Center in Manhattan, following a heart operation. She was survived by her four remaining children—Molly died in 1978—and four stepsons, twenty-six grandchildren and thirty great-grandchildren. The New York Times published an obituary crediting her with introducing Americans to origami. Robinson concurred in the Encyclopædia Britannica's entry on the subject. According to Robinson, the efforts of Oppenheimer in the United States, Harbin and Legman in Europe and Yoshizawa in Japan turned origami into an organized art form whose practitioners actively communicated.

At the time of Oppenheimer's death, around thirty countries had origami societies, with England's and Israel's being established by her daughter Rosaly. The Origami Center ceased to exist after Oppenheimer died. On July 1, 1994, the Friends were renamed OrigamiUSA. They still have their office at the American Museum of Natural History. Maintaining many regional branches and ties to origami societies in other countries, OrigamiUSA remains the main origami organization in the United States.

In September 2005, OrigamiUSA proposed making Oppenheimer's birthday on October 24 an origami day before they were reminded that Japan already had an Origami Day on November 11. The organization then proposed recognizing the period between October 24 and November 11 as World Origami Days (WOD). They formed a WOD committee and hold annual events during this period.

== Bibliography ==
=== With Shari Lewis ===
During her second marriage, Oppenheimer befriended the puppeteer Shari Lewis, who inspired her to take up amateur ventriloquism and puppetry. Three books were published with the two as co-writers, but Lewis wrote while Oppenheimer merely supplied the models; Giuseppe Baggi also contributed models to Folding Paper Masks. The books helped Oppenheimer gain further publicity for her origami activities. After her husband's death, Oppenheimer held frequent puppetry meetings in her apartment, where she built a puppet theater. She was a founding member of the Puppetry Guild of Greater New York, and active in the Storytelling Center of New York. She sometimes combined her three interests and told stories with origami puppets.

- Lewis, Shari; Oppenheimer, Lillian (1962). Folding Paper Puppets. New York: Stein and Day. ASIN B000NWKJ24.
- Lewis, Shari; Oppenheimer, Lillian (1963). Folding Paper Toys. Lanham, Md.: Scarborough House.
- Lewis, Shari; Oppenheimer, Lillian (1965). Folding Paper Masks. New York: E. P. Dutton. ASIN B000K6G2BK.

=== With Natalie Epstein ===
- Oppenheimer, Lillian; Epstein, Natalie (1980). Decorative Napkin Folding for Beginners. Mineola, N.Y.: Dover Publications. ISBN 0-486237-97-4.
- Oppenheimer, Lillian; Epstein, Natalie (1984). More Decorative Napkin Folding. Mineola, N.Y.: Dover Publications. ISBN 9780486246734.

=== Chapters ===
- Oppenheimer, Lillian (1959). "Introduction". How to Make Origami: The Art of Paper Folding. McDowell, Obolensky.
- Oppenheimer, Lillian (1983). "Introduction". Origami for Christmas. Kodansha International. ISBN 9780870115288.
