= History of origami =

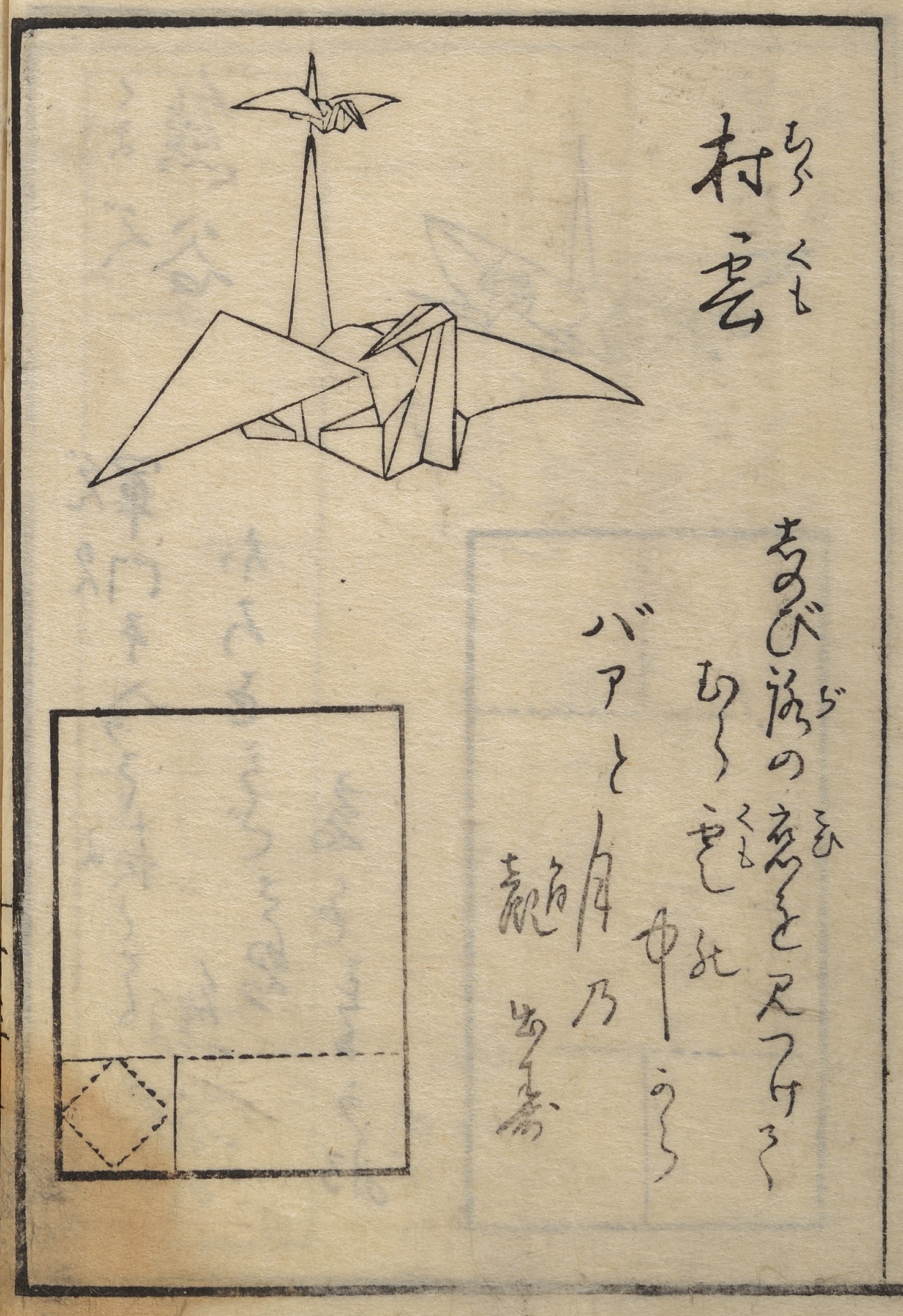
The folding of two origami cranes linked together from the first known technical book on origami Hiden senbazuru orikata by Akisato Rito, published in Japan in 1798

The history of origami followed after the invention of paper and was a result of paper's use in society. In the detailed Japanese classification, origami is divided into stylized ceremonial origami (儀礼折り紙, girei origami) and recreational origami (遊戯折り紙, yūgi origami), and only recreational origami is generally recognized as origami. However, this page describes the history of both ceremonial and recreational origami.

The modern growth of interest in origami dates to the design in 1954 by Akira Yoshizawa of a notation to indicate how to fold origami models. The Yoshizawa-Randlett system is now used internationally. Today the popularity of origami has given rise to origami societies such as the British Origami Society and OrigamiUSA. The first known origami social group was founded in Zaragoza, Spain during the 1940s.

== Traditional designs ==
=== Ceremonial origami (origata) ===
By the 7th century, paper had been introduced to Japan from China via the Korean Peninsula, and the Japanese developed washi by improving the method of making paper in the Heian period. The paper making technique developed in Japan around 805 to 809 was called nagashi-suki (流し漉き), a method of adding mucilage to the process of the conventional tame-suki (溜め漉き) technique to form a stronger layer of paper fibers. With the development of Japanese paper making technology and the widespread use of paper, folded paper began to be used for decorations and tools for religious ceremonies such as gohei, ōnusa (ja:大麻 (神道)) and shide at Shinto shrines. Religious decorations made of paper and the way gifts were wrapped in folded paper gradually became stylized and established as ceremonial origami. During the Heian period, the Imperial court established a code of etiquette for wrapping money and goods used in ceremonies with folded paper, and a code of etiquette for wrapping gifts.

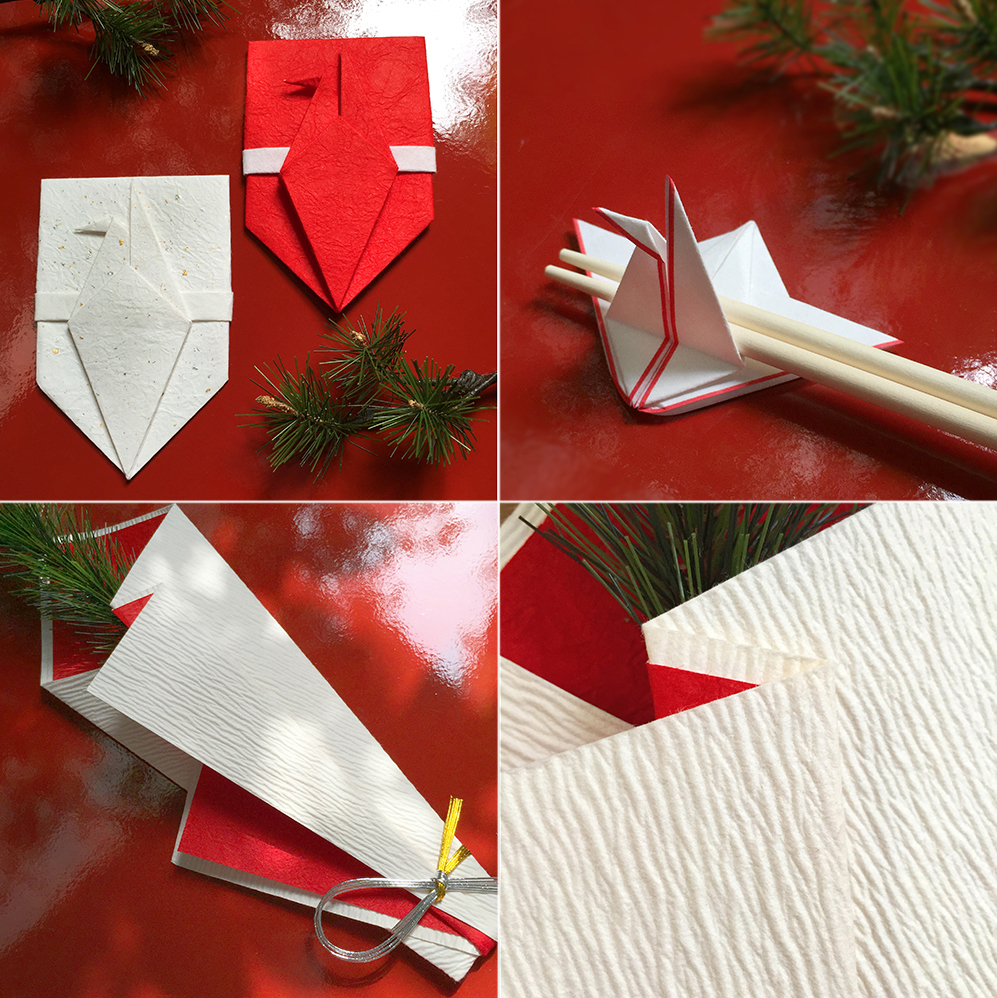
A modern ceremonial origami (origata) that follows the ceremonial origami of the upper samurai class of the Muromachi period

In the Muromachi period from the 1300s to the 1400s, various forms of decorum were developed by the Ogasawara clan and Ise clans (ja:伊勢氏), completing the prototype of Japanese folded-paper decorum that continues to this day. The Ise clan presided over the decorum of the inside of the palace of the Ashikaga Shogunate, and in particular, Ise Sadachika (ja:伊勢貞親) during the reign of the eighth Shogun, Ashikaga Yoshimasa (足利義政), greatly influenced the development of the decorum of the daimyo and samurai classes, leading to the development of various stylized forms of ceremonial origami. The shapes of ceremonial origami created in this period were geometric, and the shapes of noshi to be attached to gifts at feasts and weddings, and origami that imitated butterflies to be displayed on sake vessels, were quite different from those of later generations of recreational origami whose shapes captured the characteristics of real objects and living things. The "noshi" wrapping, and the folding of female and male butterflies, which are still used for weddings and celebrations, are a continuation and development of a tradition that began in the Muromachi period. A reference in a poem by Ihara Saikaku from 1680 describes the origami butterflies used during Shinto weddings to represent the bride and groom.

=== Recreational origami ===
It is not certain when play-made paper models, now commonly known as origami, began in Japan. However, the kozuka of a Japanese sword made by Gotō Eijō (後藤栄乗) between the end of the 1500s and the beginning of the 1600s was decorated with a picture of a crane made of origami, and it is believed that origami for play existed by the Sengoku period or the early Edo period.

In 1747, during the Edo period, a book titled Ranma zushiki (欄間図式) was published, which contained various designs of the ranma (ja:欄間), a decoration of Japanese architecture. This included origami of various designs, including paper models of cranes, which are still well known today, and it is thought that by this time, many people were familiar with origami for play, which modern people recognize as origami. During this period, origami was commonly called orikata (折形) or orisue (折据) and was often used as a pattern on kimonos and decorations.

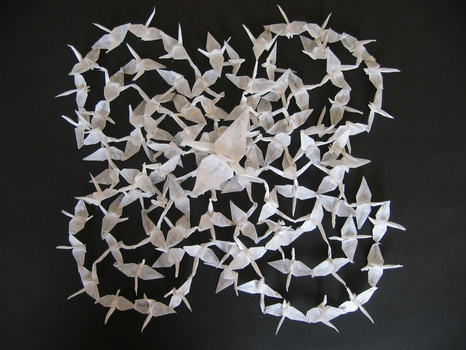
Hyakkaku (百鶴, One hundred cranes) is one of the works featured in Hiden senbazuru orikata. It is made by folding a single sheet of paper, and its production method has been designated an Intangible Cultural Property of Kuwana City.

Hiden senbazuru orikata (ja:秘傳千羽鶴折形), published in 1797, is the oldest known technical book on origami for play. The book contains 49 origami pieces created by a Buddhist monk named Gidō (:ja:義道) in Ise Province, whose works were named and accompanied by kyōka (狂歌, comic tanka) by author Akisato Ritō (秋里籬島). These pieces were far more technically advanced than their predecessors, suggesting that origami culture had become more sophisticated. Gido continued to produce origami after the publication of his book, leaving at least 158 highly skilled masterpieces for posterity. In 1976, Kuwana City in Mie Prefecture, Gido's hometown, designated 49 of the methods described in the Hiden senbazuru orikata as Intangible Cultural Properties of Kuwana City. Kuwana City has also certified qualified persons who are able to correctly produce these works and have in-depth knowledge of the art. Kuwana City has published some of the origami production methods on YouTube.

From the late Edo period to the Bakumatu period, origami that imitated the six legendary Japanese poets, rokkasen (六歌仙) listed in the Kokin Wakashū (古今和歌集) compiled in the 900s and the characters in Chūshingura became popular, but today they are rarely used as subjects for origami.

The earliest evidence of paperfolding in Europe is a picture of a small paper boat in the 1498 French edition of Johannes de Sacrobosco's Tractatus de Sphaera Mundi. There is also evidence of a cut and folded paper box from 1440. It is possible that paperfolding in the west originated with the Moors much earlier; however, it is not known whether it was independently discovered or knowledge of origami came along the silk route.

== Modern designs and innovations ==
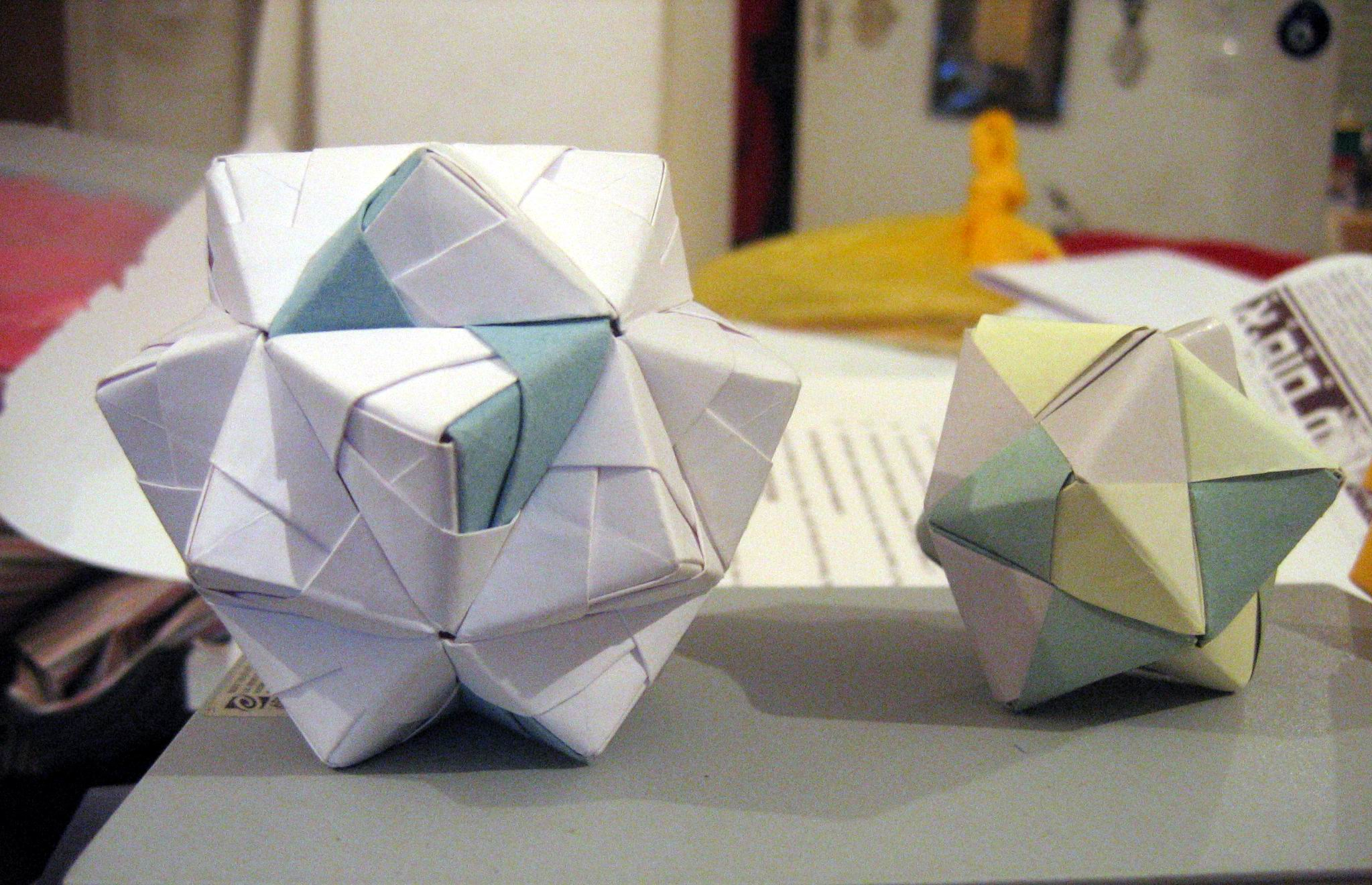
An example of modular origami (geometric shapes formed from Sonobe units)

Friedrich Fröbel — the inventor of kindergarten — recognized paper binding, weaving, folding, and cutting as teaching aids for child development during the early 19th century. As the kindergarten system spread throughout Europe and into the rest of the world, it brought with it the small colored squares that we know of today as origami paper.

The modernization of Japan began during the Meiji era, when the first kindergarten in Japan was established in 1875 and origami began to be used as part of early childhood education in Japan. The kindergarten's 1877 regulations listed 25 activities, including origami subjects. Shōkokumin (小国民), a magazine for boys, frequently published articles on origami. Origami Zusetsu (折紙図説), published in 1908, clearly distinguished ceremonial origami from recreational origami. These books and magazines carried both the traditional Japanese style of origami and the style inspired by Fröbel.

Josef Albers, the father of modern color theory and minimalistic art, taught origami and paper folding in the 1920s and 30s at the famous Bauhaus design school. His methods, which involved sheets of round paper that were folded into spirals and curved shapes, have influenced modern origami artists like Kunihiko Kasahara.

The work of Akira Yoshizawa, of Japan, a creator of origami designs and a writer of books on origami, inspired a modern renaissance of the craft. He invented the process and techniques of wet-folding and set down the initial set of symbols for the standard Yoshizawa-Randlett system that Robert Harbin and Samuel Randlett later improved upon. His work was promoted through the studies of Gershon Legman as published in the seminal books of Robert Harbin's Paper Magic and more so in Secrets of the Origami Masters which revealed the wide world of paper folding in the mid-1960s.

Modern origami has attracted a worldwide following, with ever more intricate designs and new techniques. One of these techniques is 'wet-folding,' the practice of dampening the paper somewhat during folding to allow the finished product to hold shape better. Variations such as modular origami, also known as unit origami, is a process where many origami units are assembled to form an often decorative whole.

Complex origami models normally require thin, strong paper or tissue foil for successful folding. These lightweight materials allow for more layers before the model becomes impractically thick. Modern origami has broken free from the traditional linear construction techniques of the past, and models are now frequently wet-folded or constructed from materials other than paper and foil. With popularity, a new generation of origami creators has experimented with crinkling techniques and smooth-flowing designs used in creating realistic masks, animals, and other traditional artistic themes.

== Sadako and the thousand cranes ==
One of the most famous origami designs is the Japanese crane. The crane is auspicious in Japanese culture. Legend says that anyone who folds one thousand paper cranes will have their heart's desire come true. The origami crane (折鶴 orizuru in Japanese) has become a symbol of peace because of this belief and because of a young Japanese girl named Sadako Sasaki. Sadako was exposed to the radiation of the atomic bombing of Hiroshima as an infant, and it took its inevitable toll on her health. She was then a hibakusha – an atom bomb survivor. By the time she was twelve in 1955, she was dying of leukemia. Her classmate told her about the legend, so she decided to fold one thousand origami cranes so that she could live. However, when she saw that the other children in her ward were dying, she realized that she would not survive and wished instead for world peace and an end to suffering.

A popular fictional version of the tale is that Sadako folded 644 cranes before she died; her classmates then continued folding cranes in honor of their friend. This version of her story has been refuted by the Hiroshima Peace Museum and her family. She was buried with many cranes, folded both by Sadako herself and her classmates. While her effort could not extend her life, it moved her friends to make a statue of Sadako in the Hiroshima Peace Park. Every year 10,000,000 cranes are sent to Hiroshima and placed near the statue. A group of one thousand paper cranes is called senbazuru in Japanese (千羽鶴).

The tale of Sadako has been dramatized in many books and movies. Sadako's older brother, Masahiro Sasaki co-wrote Sadako's complete story in English, as he remembers it, in hope of dispelling the many fictionalized versions of his sister's story.

== See also ==
- History of paper
- Mathematics of paper folding
