= Ligia Montoya =

Ligia Montoya (February 23, 1920 – April 18, 1967) was an Argentine paper-folding artist, who played an important role in all aspects of the 'golden age' of the international origami movement from the 1950s, from which developed modern artistic origami—that is, innovative paper-folding exploring a variety of different approaches, rather than repeating limited traditional figures.

== Biography ==
Ligia Montoya was born in Buenos Aires in the Republic of Argentina. Of a shy and retiring nature, she nevertheless came into extended correspondence with leading paperfolders internationally, and to be highly respected, as the "Angel of Origami", and thus influential in the development of this modern art. Although she never published a projected book of her numerous designs, she posted many original models abroad. For many years, the only facts about her life were largely based on a number of brief sources, of varying authority. Facts had been sketchy and in places tentative. Until recently, there was not even a firm date for her birth from which to measure. The most complete biography to date is the book titled "Paper Life" and its Spanish version "El Angel del Origami" by Laura Rozenberg.

In youth Ligia Montoya travelled from Buenos Aires to Spain, where she completed elementary then high school education. With the outbreak of the Spanish Civil War and the closing of universities in 1936, she returned to Argentina, enrolling in literature at Universidad de Buenos Aires and studying for a second degree in library science (bibliotecología). Beginning in 1938 in Córdoba, Argentina, Dr Vicente Solórzano Sagredo published an ambitious series of origami books. At first these were illustrated with photographs; then he employed Ligia Montoya to do careful drawings, using Solórzano's complex notation system. However, her work there, not only as illustrator but, necessarily, as analyst—even improver—of his folds, went unacknowledged.

For many years, starting in 1952, Ligia Montoya joined in extended communication with American Gershon Legman, with whom she worked cooperatively for years on technical and artistic aspects of paperfolding. Her most celebrated analytic accomplishment was reconstruction of the base for the famous dragonfly from the Japanese Kayaragusa. Through the New York Origami Center (now OrigamiUSA) and Legman's connections, Ligia Montoya developed extensive communication with the founder of the center, Lillian Oppenheimer, as well as with Alice Gray, Fred Rohm and Samuel Randlett in the United States; Robert Harbin and Iris Walker in England; Akira Yoshizawa in Japan. A profile of her, with picture, was published in the Origamian. Montoya and Yoshizawa works were featured in the 1959 paperfolding exhibit at the Cooper-Hewitt National Design Museum, later described by Cooper Union as the first origami exhibition in the United States. The online facsimile of the catalogue for the exhibit lists Montoya's five models as Group of Flowers, Fly, Two Moths, Three Beetles, and Group of Birds, and separately credits her reconstruction of the dragonfly from the Kanomado Book of Origami.

In the mid-1960s, the active Spanish paperfolder Francisco del Rio attempted, unsuccessfully, to draw Ligia Montoya into the center of organized paperfolding culture. She reportedly wished only to keep house for her close family, consisting of her mother, sister, brother-in-law and their three children—with time for paper-folding and correspondence. It appears that a serious accident in the early 1960s, followed by her mother's death in 1966, added to Ligia Montoya's declining health, spelled her end a year later, but not before she made careful drawings and folded duplicates of many of her voluminous productions, so that her life's work might survive her. David Lister observes: "For the grace and simple beauty of her creations and also her folding, no other paperfolder has been admired more than Ligia Montoya. Yet she herself remains an enigmatic person. She corresponded generously with many other folders throughout the world, yet she surrounded her private life with a barrier of modesty that none could penetrate."

== Style and influences ==
Ligia Montoya's own designs are, in subject-matter, drawn from close observation of nature: notably birds, flowers and insects typical of Argentina. Her models are exact, fine and lively, expressing the shapes and creases of her thin, crisp and strong, white airmail paper (always) in the living forms it represents. Her origami Nativity crèche scene is an outstanding example. Ligia Montoya was long the only Spanish-speaking member (honorary) of the Origami Center. Robert Harbin's extended section on Montoya in his 1971 Secrets of Origami is the main source for her designs. Harbin, who there called her "the foremost woman paper-folder today", continued: "Her creations, which are innumerable, range from simple figures of birds and flowers to fantastically difficult insects. Her work is sensitive and ingenious, and her generosity in passing on her secrets to others is widely known. My great regret is that nobody will ever be able to set down on paper, or put into diagram form, the whole of her work."

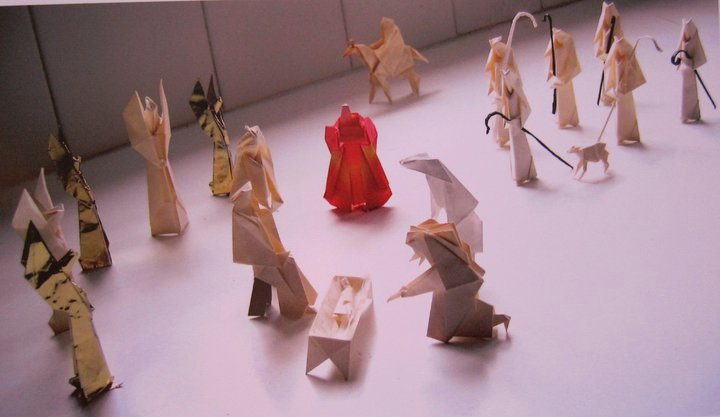
version of Montoya Nativity—not on airmail paper, and with additional magi figures based on one by Spanish follower of Unamuno, another by Adolfo Cerceda, a third by Yoshizawa.

Hers seems to have been a public life of fine paper, folded or written upon. A beginning of an account of her aesthetic is suggested by James Sakoda: "The artistic folder, best illustrated by Ligia Montoya, observes the limitations of the paper, emphasizes clean-cut straight lines, which are characteristic of folds, and produces beautiful and somewhat stylized figures."
