= David Lister =

David Lister may refer to:

- Dave Lister, a fictional character from the British science fiction situation comedy Red Dwarf
- David Lister (director), South African-born film and television director
- David Lister (origami historian) (1930–2013), British origami historian

== See also ==
- David Cunliffe-Lister, 2nd Earl of Swinton (1937–2006), British peer and politician
