= Between the Folds =

- Directed by: Vanessa Gould
- Written by: Vanessa Gould
- Cinematography: Philippe Bellaiche; Melissa R. Donovan
- Edited by: Kristi Barlow
- Music by: Gil Talmi
- Release date: 2008
- Running time: 56 minutes
- Country: United States
- Language: English

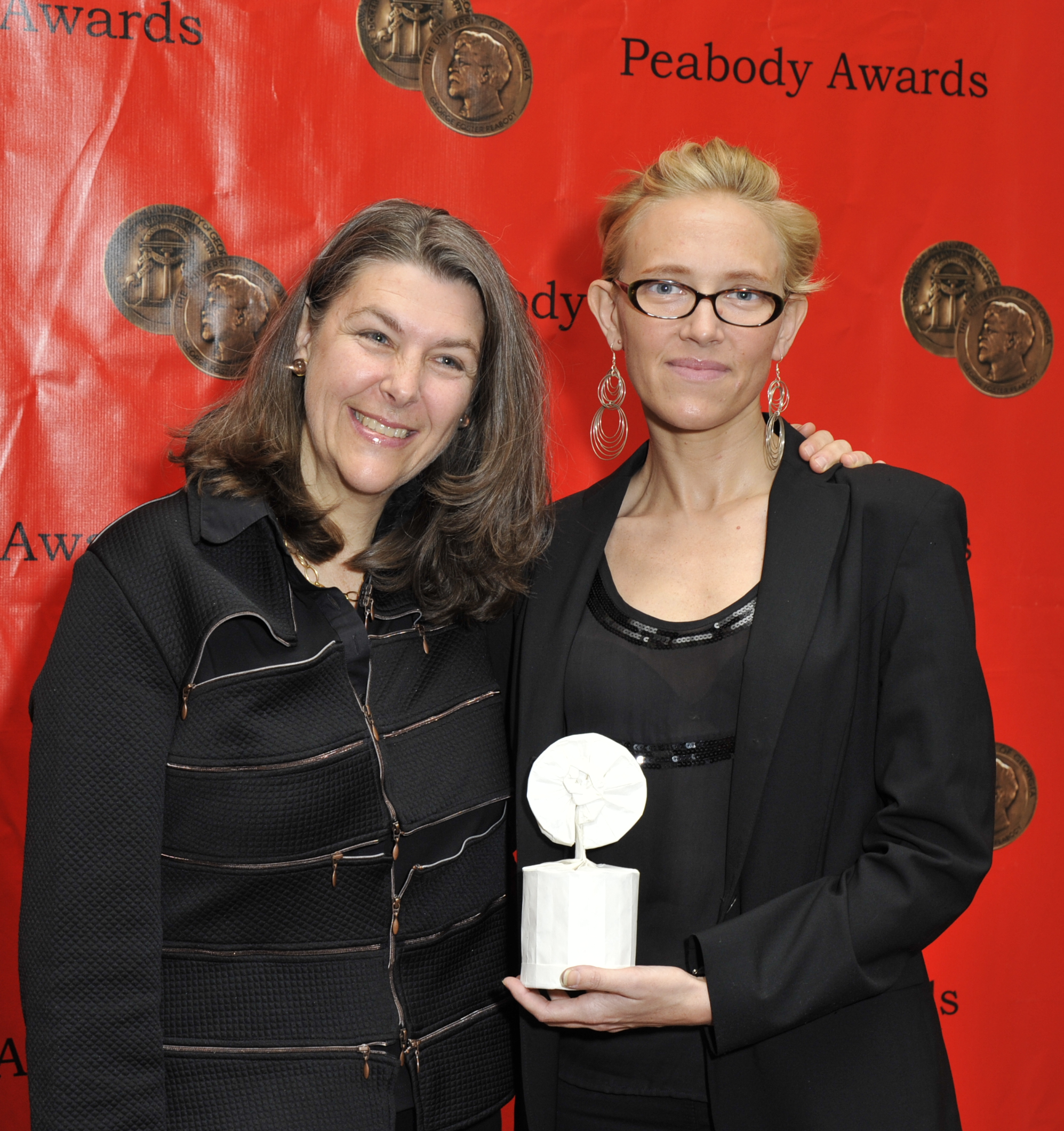
Sally Rosenthal and Vanessa Gould at the 69th Peabody Awards Luncheon in 2010

Between the Folds is a 2008 film documentary about origami. Directed by Vanessa Gould and broadcast on Independent Lens, the film received a 2010 Peabody Award.

Notable origami artists featured in the film include Erik and Martin Demaine, Tom Hull, Éric Joisel, Satoshi Kamiya, Robert J. Lang, and (using archival footage) Akira Yoshizawa.

== Home media ==
Between the Folds has been released as a region 1 DVD.

== See also ==
- Obit is a 2016 documentary written and directed by Vanessa Gould.
