= Norio =

- Gender: Male

Origin
- Origin: Japanese
- Meaning: Different meanings depending on the kanji used

Norio (written: 規夫, 規郎, 典夫, 典雄, 典士, 範夫, 範男, 徳雄, 徳男, 法夫, 法男, 法生, 紀夫, 紀雄, 紀生, 紀男, 則夫, 則男, 教生, 昇男, 憲生, 詔夫, 宜央 or のりお in hiragana) is a masculine Japanese given name. Notable people with the name include:

- Norio Ban (伴 紀雄), Japanese rower
- Norio Hayakawa (born 1944), American activist
- Norio Hirate (平手 則男; born 1948), Japanese speed skater
- Norio Honaga (保永 昇男; born 1955), Japanese professional wrestler
- Norio Hotogi (罐 範男; born 1943), Japanese cyclist
- Norio Imamura (いまむら のりお; born 1954), Japanese actor
- Norio Ishizawa (石澤 典夫; born 1952), Japanese journalist
- Norio Ito (伊東 徳雄; born 1948), Japanese ice hockey player
- Norio Kaifu (海部宣男; 1943-2019), Japanese astronomer
- Norio Kobayashi (小林 のりお; born 1952), Japanese photographer
- Norio Kudo (工藤 紀夫; born 1940), Japanese Go player
- Norio Maeda (前田 憲男; 1934–2018), Japanese jazz composer and pianist
- Norio Matsubara (born 1968), Brazilian racing driver
- Norio Mikami (三上 法夫; born 1947), Japanese golfer
- Norio Mitsuya (三ッ矢 憲生; born 1950), Japanese politician
- Norio Murata (村田 教生; born 1976), Japanese footballer
- Norio Nagayama (永山 則夫; 1949–1997), Japanese spree killer and writer
- Norio Nakai (中井 紀夫; born 1952), Japanese writer
- Norio Niikawa (新川 詔夫; born 1942), Japanese physician and geneticist
- Norio Nishiyama, Japanese mixed martial artist
- Norio Ohga (大賀 典雄; 1930–2011), Japanese chief executive
- Norio Omura (小村 徳男; born 1969), Japanese footballer
- Norio Sakurai (桜井のりお, Sakurai Norio), Japanese female manga artist and illustrator
- Norio Sasaki (佐々木 則夫; born 1958), Japanese footballer and manager
- Norio Sassa (佐々 宜央; born 1984), Japanese basketball coach
- Shimotori Norio (霜鳳 典雄; born 1978), Japanese sumo wrestler
- Norio Shinozaki (篠崎 紀夫; born 1969), Japanese golfer
- Norio Shioyama (塩山 紀生; born 1940), Japanese animator, illustrator and character designer
- Norio Suzuki (explorer) (鈴木 紀夫; 1949–1986), Japanese explorer
- Norio Suzuki (footballer) (鈴木 規郎; born 1984), Japanese footballer
- Norio Suzuki (golfer) (鈴木 規夫; born 1951), Japanese golfer
- Norio Takahashi (高橋 範夫; born 1971), Japanese footballer
- Norio Takashima (高島 規郎), Japanese table tennis player
- Norio Takeuchi (武内 則男; born 1958), Japanese politician
- Norio Tanabe (田辺 徳雄; born 1966), Japanese baseball player and coach
- Norio Tanaka (田中 法生), Japanese aquatic botanist
- Norio Taniguchi (谷口 紀男; 1912–1999), Japanese scientist and academic
- Norio Torimoto (born 1948), Japanese origami artist
- Norio Tsukitate (築舘 範男; born 1960), Japanese footballer and manager
- Norio Tsukudani (佃煮 のりお), Japanese female manga artist and illustrator
- Norio Tsuruta (鶴田 法男; born 1960), Japanese film director
- Norio Wakamoto (若本 規夫; born 1945), Japanese voice actor
- Norio Wakui (涌井 紀夫; 1942–2009), Japanese judge
- Norio Yamanaka (山中 典士; born 1928), Japanese writer
- Norio Yoshimizu (吉水 法生; born 1946), Japanese footballer

== See also ==
- Norio (village), a village in Kvemo Kartli, Georgia
