= Jeremy Shafer =

American origamist and author (born 1973)

- Born: Jeremy Shafer; Berkeley, California, United States
- Other names: JeremyShaferOrigami; jeremyshafervariety; Jeremy the Juggler
- Occupations: Origamist; Performer; Juggler

YouTube information
- Channel: JeremyShaferOrigami
- Years active: 2010-present
- Genres: how-to tutorials; entertainment
- Subscribers: 748 thousand
- Views: 301 million
- Website: jeremyevents.com

Jeremy Shafer is an American professional entertainer and origamist based in Berkeley, California. He has been folding origami since he was ten. He creates his own origami designs which tend to be whimsical and unique, such as his "Man Swatter", "BARF Bag" and his working origami household items, like his "Nail Clippers" and his "Swiss Army Knife". Shafer is sometimes billed as Jeremy the Juggler, and his stunts include folding a burning origami bird, riding a flaming unicycle, and juggling torches.

== Personal life ==
Jeremy Shafer grew up in Berkeley, California. He went to high school at Berkeley High School and graduated in 1991. He attended college at the University of California, Santa Cruz and graduated in 1995 with a Bachelor of Arts in Mathematics. He then later decided to pursue his career as a professional child entertainer. Shafer is fluent in Spanish and can also speak some French, Italian, and Japanese. Shafer resides in Berkeley, California. He releases new origami models every week. He was married at age 28 and got divorced in 2015. On January 1, 2018, Shafer's mother, Margo, died after facing several illnesses in life. Shafer and his father designed an origami "MOM" shortly after her death.

== Work on Origami ==
Shafer has taught at multiple workshops and camps for both children and adults. He taught for 13 summers at Camp Winnarainbow, a circus-arts/activities camp in California. He has taught scientists how to design their own origami models as an exercise in problem-solving. His contributions to the origami community (one of his most recognizable works is an origami figure with hands emerging from it, appearing to fold itself) have led him to become one of the world's leading and most influential origami masters. He is an entertainer as well, performing his act (in which origami is a large part) at fairs and private parties across the globe. As well as folding others' models, he has designed hundreds of his own and published many of them across three books.

Shafer was an active member of OrigamiUSA and published a quarterly newsletter for the San Francisco Bay Area origami group, BARF (Bay Area Rapid Folders, a play on BART, Bay Area Rapid Transit). However, he decided to resign to focus on his YouTube channel. He has four YouTube channels which are called Jeremyevents, JeremyShafervariety, JeremyShaferOrigami, and Simple Balloon Animals. Out of all four, JeremyShaferOrigami is his most popular channel, where he teaches how to fold new origami models that he designed, as well as some from his books Origami Ooh La La and Origami to Astonish and Amuse. The channel has over 752,000 subscribers, and over 301,000,000 views.

== Publications ==
- Origami to Astonish and Amuse. St. Martin's Griffin, 2001. ISBN 0-312-25404-0
- Origami Ooh La La! CreateSpace, 2010. ISBN 1-4564-3964-2
- Origami Pop-Ups to Amaze and Amuse. CreateSpace, December 2013. ISBN 1-494-29902-X
