= David Lister (origami historian) =

British origami historian (1930–2013)

David Lister (18 April 1930 – 13 February 2013) was a British historian, specialising in origami. He was a founding member of the British Origami Society. He wrote its constitution and served as its first president.

== Personal life ==
Born in Grimsby, Lincolnshire, Lister was educated at a state school in Grimsby before earning a degree in history at Downing College, Cambridge. He then worked as a solicitor in Grimsby. Lister had three children and six grandchildren.

== Origami ==
Lister was interested in Origami since he was young, but took it up in earnest in 1955 after seeing Robert Harbin on television in the children's show Mr Left and Mr Right. He corresponded with Lillian Oppenheimer and became a member of the Origami Portfolio Society founded in 1965. In 1967, he was an inaugural member of the British Origami Society and its first president, a position he also held from 1998 to 2002. During his life he built a large library that included 5,000 origami related items. He researched the history of origami and corresponded with most of the founders of modern origami. He became prominent after his retirement when he became increasingly involved in Origami and the British Origami Society. He was considered a world authority on the culture and history of origami, and contributed articles on the history of origami to magazines throughout the world.

He was also interested in string figures, recreational mathematics, heraldry, and Chinese pottery, among other things. The library he put together on his various interests grew to a final size of more than 25,000 books.
