= Makoto Yamaguchi =

Japanese origami folder

Makoto Yamaguchi (山口 真, Yamaguchi Makoto, born 1944 in Tokyo), the Chairperson of Origami House, has taken an active part in origami as a professional creator after working with the Nippon Origami Association. In 1989, he opened "Gallery Origami House", a venue to showcase the works of origami creators. He has worked hard to encourage young creators to continue to improve their models, to interchange with foreign groups and creators abroad. His enthusiasm for origami has led him to become involved with origami associations around the world. JOAS (Japanese Origami Academic Society) Board of Directors President; Board member of NOA (Nippon Origami Association); lifetime member of OrigamiUSA, member of British Origami Society and Chief Editor of "Origami Tanteidan" magazine.

== Books ==
- Let's Enjoy Paper Folding Vol. 1: Origami Flowers and Vegetables, ISBN 4-321-45501-4
- Let's Enjoy Paper Folding Vol. 2: Animals, ISBN 4-321-45502-2
- Kusudama Ball Origami, ISBN 0-87040-863-1
- Tanoshii Origami Tenshu, ISBN 4-391-12031-3
- Joyful Life with Origami/Kurashi ni Yakudatsu Jitsuyou Origami, ISBN 4-7916-0085-1
- Origami in English, ISBN 4-7700-2027-9
