= Sakoda =

Sakoda (written: 迫田) is a Japanese surname. Notable people with the surname include:

- James Sakoda (1916–2005), psychologist and pioneer in computational modeling
- Louie Sakoda (born 1986), American football player
- Ryan Sakoda (born 1974), Japanese-American professional wrestler
- Saori Sakoda (迫田 さおり, born 1987), Japanese volleyball player
