= Peter Engel (author) =

American origami artist (born 1959)

Peter Engel (born 1959) is an American origami artist and theorist, science writer, graphic designer, and architect. He has written several books on Origami, including Origami from Angelfish to Zen, 10-Fold Origami: Fabulous Paperfolds You Can Make in Just 10 Steps!, and Origami Odyssey.

== Education ==
Engel studied the history and philosophy of science as an undergraduate at Harvard University, where he began studying origami seriously under design scientist Arthur Loeb. In 1987 he graduated from Columbia University with a master's degree in architecture.

== Works ==
- Folding the Universe: Origami from Angelfish to Zen (1989) is his first book on origami. It is a highly unusual origami book in that besides the usual folding instructions, a significant portion was devoted to essays on the history of the craft as well as the theory. By exploring the relationship between art and science, and between creation, invention, and discovery, Engel provides unusual insights on the craft medium which has strict inherent constraints in favouring simple, geometric patterns and yet holds enough creative possibility within it to capture an unexpected range of complex forms. His models range from a unique coiled rattlesnake to a charming dollar bill bow tie to a delicate, detailed butterfly. The book also contains an interview with the legendary Japanese origami artist Akira Yoshizawa. Folding the Universe was later re-released as Origami from Angelfish to Zen. (Note: Origami from Angelfish to Zen, Peter Engel, Dover Publications, 1994; ISBN 0-486-28138-8)
- 10-Fold Origami: Fabulous Paperfolds You Can Make in Just 10 Steps! (2009) (Note: 10-Fold Origami: Fabulous Paperfolds You Can Make in Just 10 Steps!, Peter Engel, Tuttle Publishing, 2009, ISBN 978-4-8053-1069-4) is his second book on origami.
- Origami Odyssey: A Journey to the Edge of Paperfolding (2011) is his third book on origami.

== See also ==
- Mathematics of origami
- OrigamiUSA
