= Paul Vitello =

American journalist (born 1950)

- Born: 1950 (age 75–76); Chicago, Illinois, U.S.
- Education: High School of Music & Art; Trinity College
- Occupation: Journalist

Paul Vitello (born 1950) is an American journalist who has written for a variety of publications. He wrote a news column for Newsday from 1982 to 2005. He went on to write for the religion and obituary sections for The New York Times and has taught at Stony Brook University's School of Journalism.

== Biography ==
Vitello was born in Chicago in 1950. He grew up on the Lower East Side of Manhattan. He graduated from the High School of Music & Art (now LaGuardia High School) and Trinity College in Hartford, Connecticut.

Before joining the Times staff in 2005, he wrote about Long Island life for Newsday for 23 years. His column received the Meyer Berger Award from Columbia University, was named the best newspaper column of the year in New York three times by the Associated Press, and won Newsday's Publisher's Award four times. He shared in Newsday's 1985 John Hancock Award for excellence in business writing and its 1997 Pulitzer Prize for Spot News Reporting for its coverage of the crash of TWA flight 800. His work was featured in the American Society of Newspaper Editors' Best Newspaper Writing 2001: The Nation's Best Journalism, published by The Poynter Institute.

On most days, I gather information for a story just as I would as a reporter; but when I write the column, it's the subtext I'm trying to get right.... Subtext is, according to my definition, the part of the story that none of the players ever mentions. It's the election politics in the prosecution of a murder case.... It can be in the way two people look at each other across a courtroom before one testifies against the other. For me, subtext is where the action is in any story.

Vitello began his career reporting for the Kansas City Times, the Knickerbocker News in Albany, New York and the City News Bureau of Chicago. As a freelance writer in Rome in 1979, he covered news from the Vatican for the Religion News Service.

Vitello is featured in the 2016 documentary Obit., about the complex work of The Times's obituary writers.
