= Obit (film) =

- Film poster by Kristin Bye
- Directed by: Vanessa Gould
- Produced by: Caitlin Mae Burke, Vanessa Gould
- Cinematography: Ben Wolf
- Edited by: Kristin Bye
- Music by: Joel Goodman
- Production company: Green Fuse Films
- Distributed by: Kino Lorber
- Release date: April 15, 2016 (Tribeca)
- Running time: 93 minutes
- Country: United States
- Language: English
- Box office: $315,049

Obit is a 2016 documentary film about the obituary writers at The New York Times.

== Synopsis ==
Obit is the first documentary to look into the world of newspaper obituaries, via the obituary desk at The New York Times. Writers are interviewed as they research and compose obituaries, including one for William P. Wilson, who coached John F. Kennedy on his historic TV debate with Richard Nixon, and one for Dick Rich, who developed ground-breaking advertising for Alka-Seltzer. Along the way obits for many other people are discussed, with accompanying film clips of their lives. Writers attend editorial meetings and struggle to get their lede just right in time for the 6 pm print-edition deadline. The lone keeper of the Times' morgue files, too massive to move to the paper's new building, describes its functions and shows off some of its treasures, including "advances" — obits written well before a person dies and kept in a locked filing cabinet. One was prepared in 1931 for Elinor Smith, an early aviator who the Times believed might die in a plane crash. When she died in 2010, age 98, her advance informed the obit desk almost 80 years after it was written.

== Cast ==
All appearing as themselves

- William McDonald
- Bruce Weber
- Margalit Fox
- William Grimes
- Jack Kadden
- Douglas Martin
- Jeff Roth
- Daniel Slotnik
- Paul Vitello

== Release ==
Obit premiered at the Tribeca Film Festival on April 15, 2016. The film was released theatrically in New York City on April 26, 2017 at Film Forum and Lincoln Plaza Cinemas, and in Los Angeles on May 5, 2017 at the Landmark Nuart. Obit's release expanded in May and June 2017, playing on 100 screens theatrically in the United States and Canada, including an 8-week engagement in Washington D.C., and 6- and 7-week engagements in New York City, Philadelphia and Berkeley, California.

== Critical reception ==
The film has generally received high critical praise. Obit currently has a score of 92% on Rotten Tomatoes.

Entertainment Weekly listed Obit in its Ten Best Movies of 2017 midyear report, calling it a "a wry, charming celebration of life in every form."

It received a Critic's Pick in the New York Times, and outside reviewer Gene Seymour wrote, "It is modest, observant, graceful and nonchalantly witty. Beneath bright newsroom lighting, cameras peer avidly over the shoulders of writers and editors as they work to meet deadlines, assemble facts and obtain perspective on the recently deceased. And one comes away from Obit grateful that the paper has at its disposal a team of humane, gifted people who make commemorating the dead a lively, lasting art."

Deadline Hollywood's Pete Hammond named Obit his favorite documentary of 2017 to date (in May), writing "As documentaries go, few of them are as outright entertaining to watch as director Vanessa Gould’s fascinating treatment of The New York Times obituary reporters, called, appropriately enough, Obit."

Writing for The Nation, Stuart Klawans states that Obit is "a remarkably good film about the craft of writing."

NPR's Andrew Lapin described the film as "heartfelt and unshakable."

Rolling Stone described the film as "stunning."

The Los Angeles Times' Kenneth Turan also named it a Critic's Pick.

Richard Roeper wrote in The Chicago Sun-Times "Vanessa Gould's Obit is a life-affirming, slyly amusing, affectionate tribute to the skilled reporters at the New York Times who spend their days gathering information and writing the first-draft mini-histories of the most interesting players on the world stage, from superstar celebrities to historical supporting players to anonymous figures who impacted our lives without us ever knowing their names – until they died."

Soheil Rezayazdi observes in Filmmaker, "Obit teems with colorful anecdotes. Gould’s camera hovers as reporters research, call relatives and pitch pieces to editors. She mixes the fly-on-the-wall work with abnormally eloquent interviews—these are Times writers, after all—and splashes of archival footage to take us outside the cubicles. The film celebrates human achievement and human strangeness. It effuses an obit writer’s intellectual curiosity and itch for a good story."

The Economist stated "Obit is a rich, compelling portrait of a profession that rarely receives the dignity it so graciously affords others."

Rex Reed, in the New York Observer, gave the film three out of four stars: "informative, fascinating and surprisingly funny...as this riveting documentary demonstrates, the Times staff that chronicles the passing of both heroes and villains strives to make sure their obits have next to nothing to do with death and everything to do with life."

British online magazine The Upcoming named Obit "the perfect documentary, with morbid wit and fearless curiosity."

== Film festivals ==
Obit screened by invitation at more than 40 international film festivals, including:

- 2016 Tribeca Film Festival
- 2016 Hot Docs Film Festival
- 2016 Provincetown International Film Festival
- 2016 AFI Docs
- 2016 New Zealand International Film Festival
- 2016 Traverse City Film Festival
- 2016 Philadelphia Film Festival
- 2016 Denver Film Festival
- 2016 Hampton's Take 2 Film Festival
- 2017 Palm Springs International Film Festival
- 2017 Portland International Film Festival
- 2017 DOC10 Film Festival

== Home media ==
Obit has been released as a region 1 DVD.

== See also ==
- Between the Folds – 2008 documentary directed by Gould about origami
