= Éric Joisel =

French origami artist

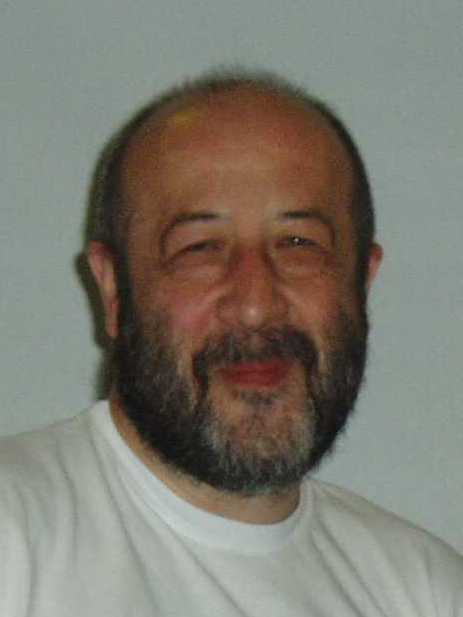
Eric Joisel

Éric Joisel (15 November 1956 – 10 October 2010) was a French origami artist who specialized in the wet-folding method, creating figurative art sculptures using sheets of paper and water, without the use of any adhesive or scissors.

== Early life ==
Joisel was born on 15 November 1956, in Montmorency, Val-d'Oise, a commune in the northern suburbs of Paris, and focused his education on history and law before turning to art. His initial experiences in the art world were in sculpting, using the traditional forms of clay and stone.

== Career ==
He first discovered in the 1980s the unique forms created with paper by Akira Yoshizawa, the Japanese grandmaster of origami who had created more than 50,000 models, developing the wet-folding method that allowed for the creation of three-dimensional rounded sculptures. Joisel was taken by the way the Yoshizawa's works blended classical origami methods and standard forms of sculpture in order to make expressive figures out of wet paper, without making any cuts or using any glue.

Joisel shifted to working with paper in the 1990s, devoting the remainder of his career to creating origami art using his own self-taught variation of the wet-folding techniques that Yoshizawa had developed and refined. He devoted his life to origami after losing his job as the manager of a printing company. Living in a small home, he devoted hours focusing on the meticulous design and detail of each piece of origami. He could spend as much as years working out the plans for one of his original origami pieces, with a single piece created over a period of days or weeks, involving hundreds of precisely planned and executed folds to sheets of paper that could measure to as much as 15 feet (4.6 m) by 25 feet (7.6 m) to create figures that ranged from the size of one's hand to life size, while many were no more than 12 inches (30 cm) high. Though his work was displayed at the Musée du Louvre and collectors from around the world paid as much as thousands of dollars for some of his origami sculptures, the tremendous amount of time that he devoted to each work meant that he didn't earn much income. Themed pieces that he handcrafted included figures from commedia dell'arte and foot-high sculptures of musicians each holding a finely detailed musical instrument.

Joisel published many of the design plans for his figures, providing a look into the extraordinary level of detail and precision that "renders his art simultaneously approachable and unattainable". In his obituary, The New York Times included instructions on how to duplicate one of Joisel's figures of a rat, though it noted that "no lay person should even contemplate the hedgehog".

Joisel was featured in the documentary Between the Folds, a 2009 film by Vanessa Gould about the modern world of origami artists.

== Gallery ==
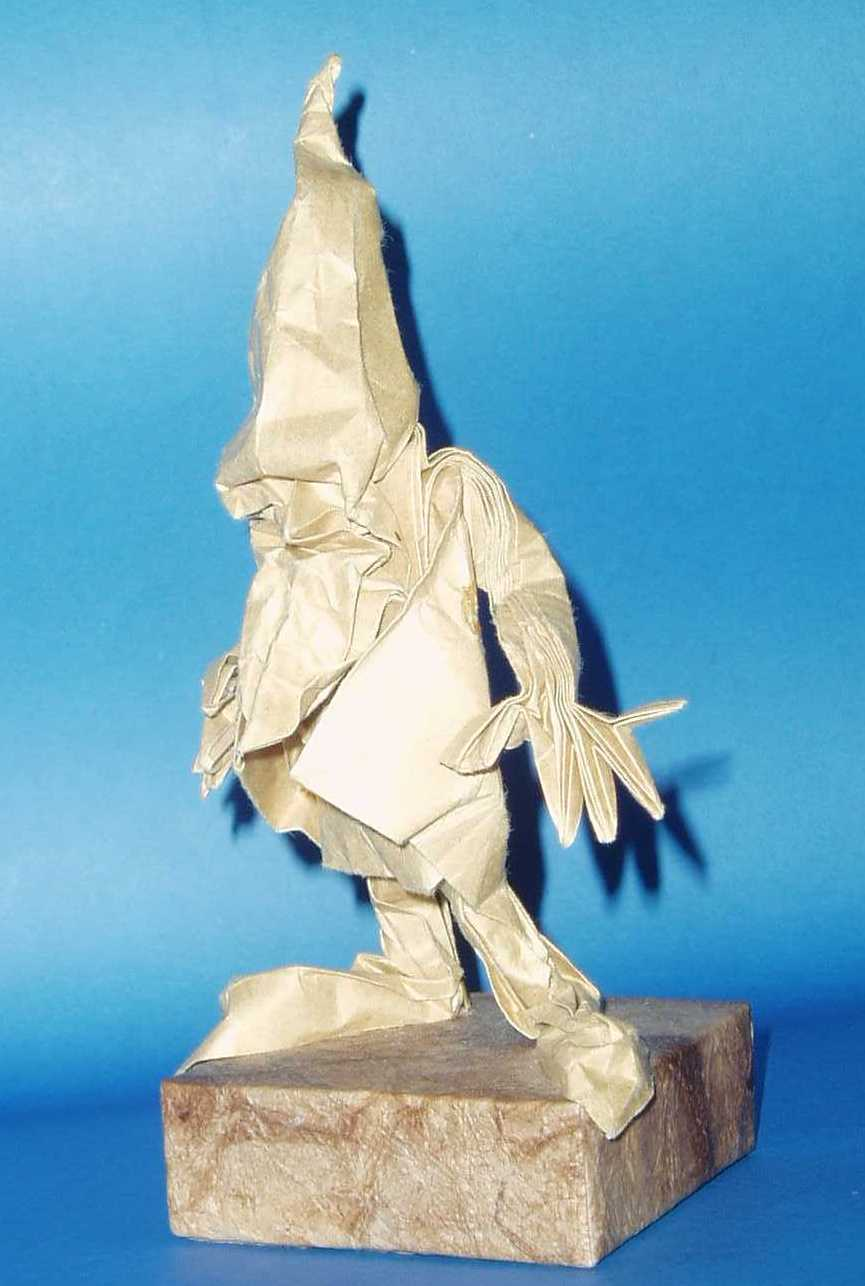
Joisel's First Dwarf

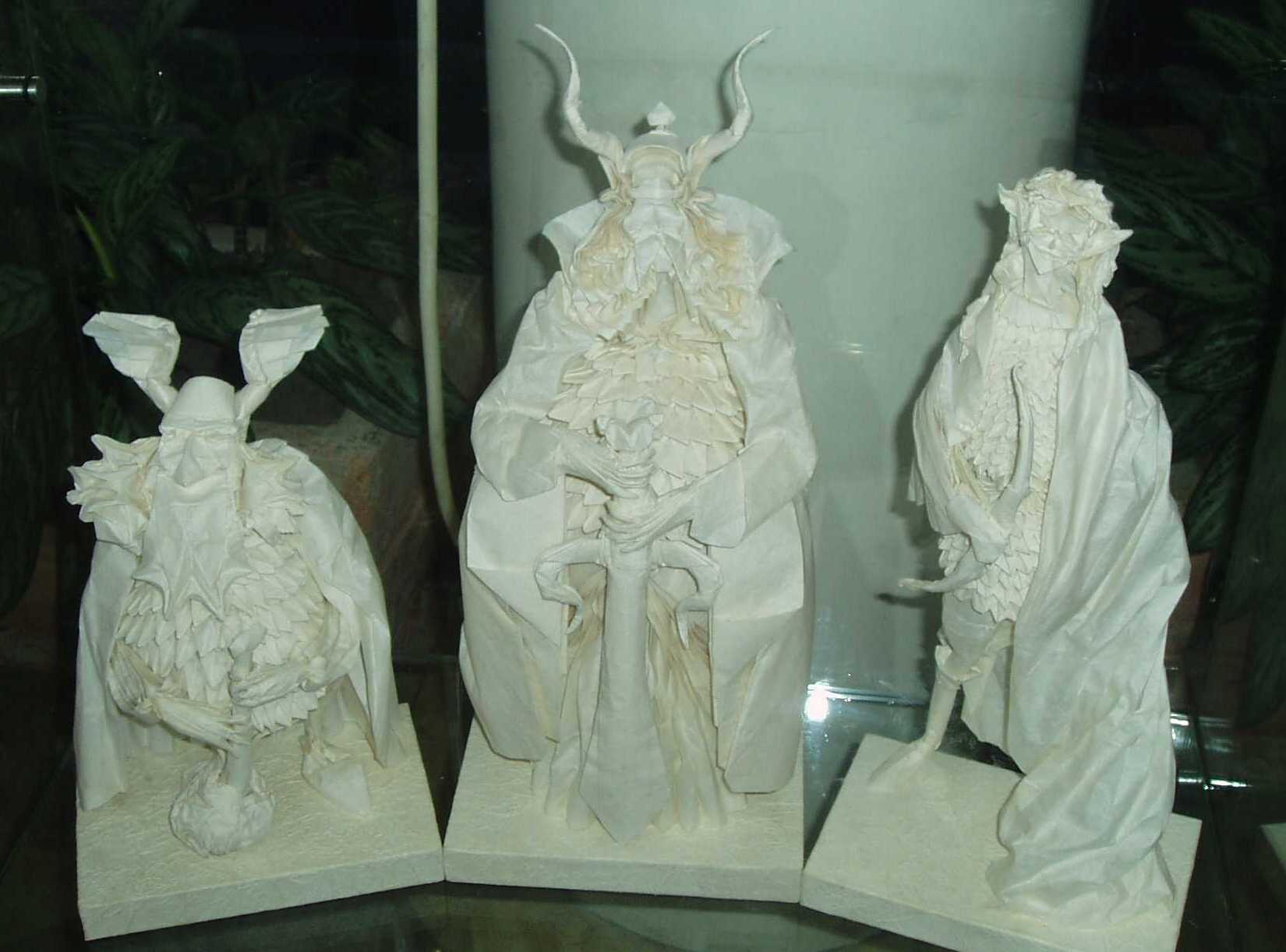
Three Kings - from Lord of the Ring

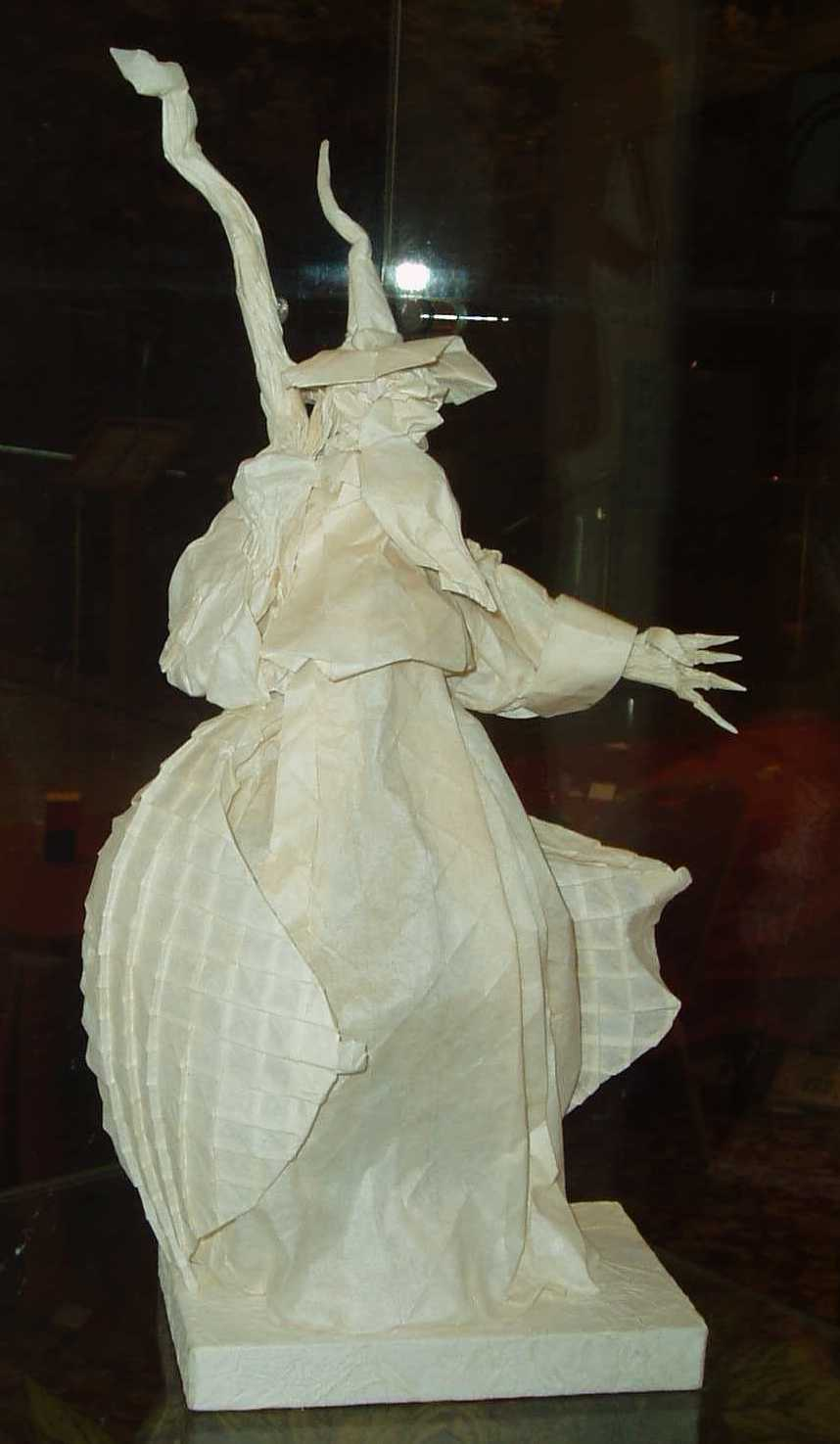
Gandalf

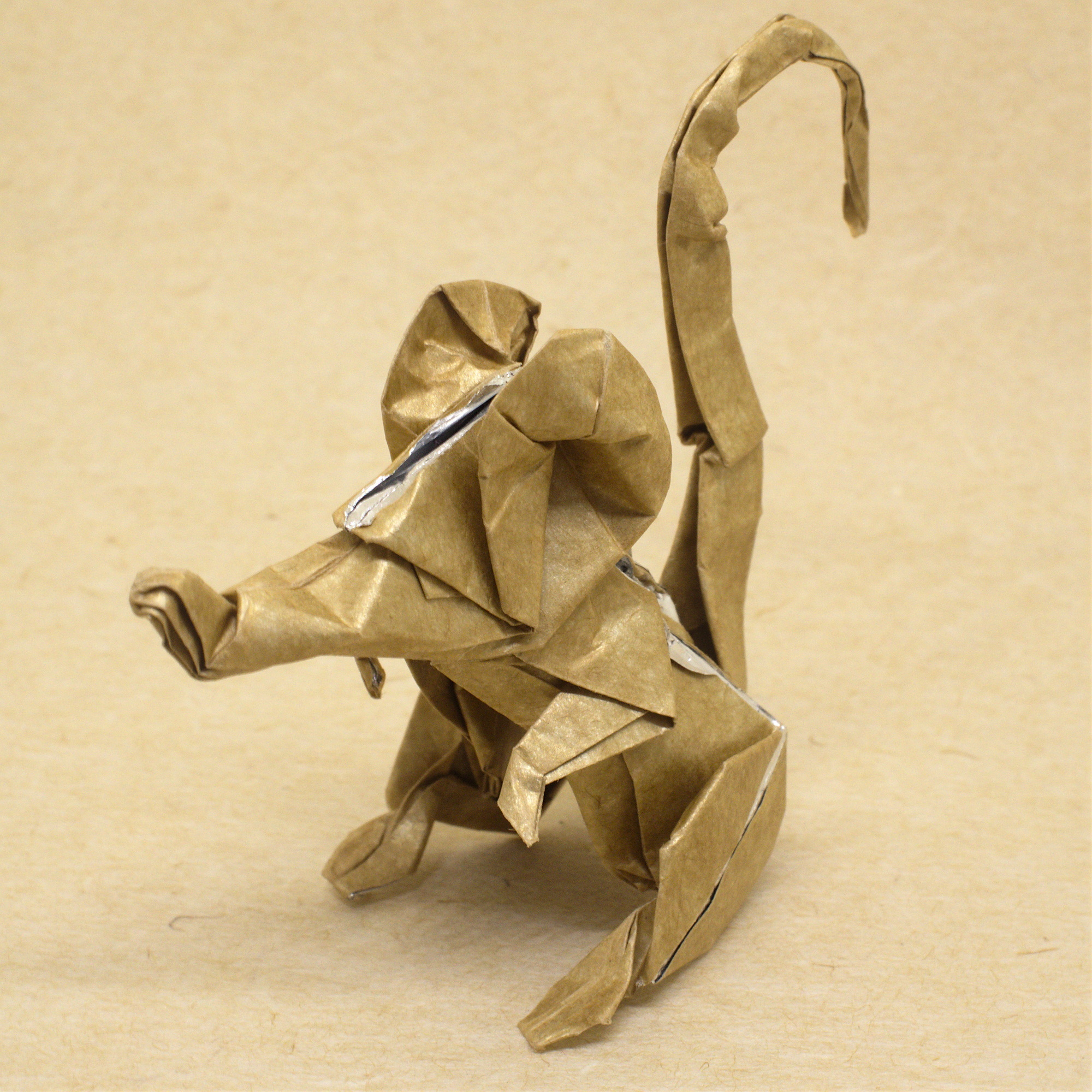
The Origami Rat

== Death ==
A resident of Sannois, Joisel died at the age of 53 on 10 October 2010, in Argenteuil, of lung cancer. He had never married and had no children, and was survived by four siblings.
