= William Grimes (journalist) =

American journalist (born 1950)

- Born: July 25, 1950 (age 75); Houston, Texas, U.S.
- Education: Indiana University Bloomington; University of Chicago
- Occupations: Journalist food writer
- Notable credit: The New York Times

William H. "Biff" Grimes (born July 25, 1950) "worked in a variety of roles at The New York Times over a 28-year career, serving as a reporter for the Obituaries, Culture, Dining and Style sections; as the restaurant critic from 1999 until 2003; as a Broadway columnist; and as a book critic. He also worked for The Times Magazine. He left The Times in 2017".

He is the author of four books on food and drink in the United States, including the recent work Appetite City: A Culinary History of New York.

== Early life and education ==
Grimes was born in Houston, Texas. In 1973, he obtained a Bachelor of Arts degree in English from Indiana University Bloomington, where he graduated with honors. In 1974, he received a Master of Arts in English from the University of Chicago and in 1982 earned his Ph.D. in comparative literature. He also received a Whiting Fellowship.

== Career ==
In April 1999, Grimes was named restaurant critic at The New York Times. Prior to that, he served as a reporter in the style department, where he wrote in the dining section since September 1997. From October 1991 until September 1997, he worked as a reporter on the cultural desk where he reviewed independent film, visual art, and books.

Grimes joined The New York Times in May 1989 as a story editor and writer. Before working for The Times, he was the executive editor for Avenue Magazine from September 1986 to May 1989, while also contributing to The New York Times Magazine.

He was a copy editor for Esquire magazine from April 1984 to September 1986. He also wrote on cocktails for the magazine.

From April 1980 to April 1984, he was associate editor of Macmillan Publishing, where he worked to translate the Great Soviet Encyclopedia into English.

Grimes features prominently in the 2017 documentary Obit, about the New York Times obituaries desk.

== Awards and honors ==
In 1998, Grimes was nominated for a James Beard Foundation award for his work on a Dining article titled "Is America Ready for Bunny Ragout?" In 1993, he was awarded the Press Club of Long Island award for his reporting for "Who Painted this Picture?"

== Personal ==
Grimes is married and he and his wife live in Astoria, Queens.

== Bibliography ==
- Appetite City: A Culinary History of New York (October 13, 2009)
- Straight Up or On the Rocks: The Story of the American Cocktail (October 2002)
- My Fine Feathered Friend (May 2002)
- Straight Up or on the Rocks: A Cultural History of American Drink (April 1993)
