= Samuel Randlett =

Samuel L Randlett (January 11, 1930 – July 2023) was an American origami artist who helped develop the modern system for diagramming origami folds. Together with Robert Harbin he developed the notation introduced by Akira Yoshizawa to form what is now called the Yoshizawa-Randlett system (sometimes known as Yoshizawa-Randlett-Harbin system). This was first described in Samuel Randlett's Art of Origami in 1961.

== Career in music and paperfolding ==
He was born in New Jersey on January 11, 1930. He attended Northwestern University, where he completed doctoral research titled The Nature and Development of Scriabin's Pianistic Vocabulary, in 1966. The dissertation was submitted to the School of Music in partial fulfillment of the requirements for the degree of Doctor of Music, field of Piano. Sources indicate he did not formally receive the PhD.

Randlett taught music at Fisk University in the 1950s and later at the University of Wisconsin-Milwakee, specializing in piano and the works of Alexander Scriabin. He published articles on piano technique, including scale fingering, pedaling and interpretation, in journals such as Clavier and The Piano Teacher.

He became interested in paperfolding in 1958. Within a year his work was exhibited at the Cooper Union Museum for the Arts of Decoration in New York. At the age of 30 started work on The Art of Origami, which helped standardize diagramming conventions known today as the Yoshizawa-Randlett-Harbin system. His first wife Jean illustrated this and most of his subsequent books.

From 1969 to 1976, Randlett edited The Flapping Bird, a newsletter for origami practitioners. He hosted weekend gatherings at his home, where folders from around the world shared new models and techniques.

In 1971, he contributed to a 13-episode educational television series on origami in Milwaukee.

He died in Wisconsin in July 2023.

== Bibliography ==
Books

- Samuel Randlett (1961). The Art of Origami; Paper Folding, Traditional and Modern. E P Dutton. ISBN 978-0-525-05834-2.
- Samuel Randlett (1963). The Best of Origami; New models by contemporary folders. Faber and Faber. ISBN 0-571-10275-1.
- Samuel Randlett (1968). Folding Money Volume Two.
- Samuel Randlett; Jean Randlett (1968). Basic Paper Folding.
- Samuel Randlett; Jean Randlett (1968–1976). The Flapping Bird on Origami Monthly. Origami USA.
- Origami (1971, TV tie-in)

Selected articles

- Randlett, Samuel. “Folding Fun with Origami: Ancient Paper Folding Art Captures Fancy of Imaginative Craftsmen Again.” Design, 1961
- Randlett, Samuel. “Gongs and Moirés: Creating Special Effects Characteristic of the Music of Alexander Scriabin.” Clavier, 1972.

Other notable publications (magic and collaboration)

- Neale, Robert E. (Author), Randlett, Samuel (Editor), Randlett, Jean (Illustrator). Bunny Bill. Magic, Inc., 1964.
- Neale, Robert E., Randlett, Samuel, Kaufman, Richard. Folding Money Fooling, 1997.
