= Yoshizawa–Randlett system =

Diagramming system for describing origami folds

The origami crane diagram, using the Yoshizawa–Randlett system

The Yoshizawa–Randlett system is a diagramming system used to describe the folds of origami models. Many origami books begin with a description of basic origami techniques which are used to construct the models. There are also a number of standard bases which are commonly used as a first step in construction. Models are typically classified as requiring low, intermediate or high skill depending on the complexity of the techniques involved in the construction.

== History ==
The concept of diagramming originated in the 1797 book “Senbazuru Orikata”, the first origami book ever published. The diagrams in this book were very unclear, and often only showed the result of the folding process, leaving the folder unsure how the model was created.

Later books began to devise a system of showing precisely how a model was folded. These ranged from an unwieldy set of symbols to a photograph or sketch of each step attempting to show the motion of a fold. None of these systems were sufficient to diagram all models, and so none were widely adopted.

In the 1950s and 1960s, Akira Yoshizawa proposed a system of diagramming. He introduced its diagramming notation in his first published monograph, Atarashi Origami Geijutsu (New Origami Art), in 1954. He employed dotted and dashed lines to represent mountain and valley folds, and a few other symbols such as the “inflate” and “round” symbols. This system caught the attention of Samuel Randlett and Robert Harbin, who added a few symbols such as “rotate” and “zoom in”, and then adopted it as the standard. The Yoshizawa–Randlett system was first described in Samuel Randlett's Art of Origami in 1961. It was then accepted as the default throughout the international origami community and is still in general use today.

== Origami symbols ==
=== Basic folds ===
The two main types of origami symbol are lines and arrows— arrows show how origami paper is bent or moved, while lines show various types of edges:

- A thick line shows the edge of the paper
- A dashed line shows a valley fold. The paper is folded in front of itself.
- A dashed and dotted line shows a mountain fold (there may be one or two dots per dash depending on the author). The paper is folded behind itself, this is normally done by turning the paper over, folding a valley fold and then turning the paper back over again.
- A thin line shows where a previous fold has creased the paper.
- A dotted line shows a previous fold that's hidden behind other paper, or sometimes shows a fold that's not yet made.
Symbols for basic folds
Valley fold

Mountain fold

Fold and unfold valley

Turn over and invisible line

=== Common operations ===
The operations shown here are all fairly common. The pleat folds and reverse folds are often done with the two creases at an angle. Reverse folds of a corner are typically used to produce feet or birds heads.

The sink fold is considered an intermediary to high skill. The version shown here is called an open sink and there is another version called a closed sink which generates a triangular pocket with no flaps showing. In simple cases the model can be partly unfolded and then folded with the sink in place.

Origami symbols
Rotate

Put the points together

Open

Pull

Repeat action

Pleat fold, also called an accordion fold

Inside crimp fold

Outside crimp fold

Inside reverse fold

Outside reverse fold

Inflate the model

Sink a corner

== Compound folds ==
- A rabbit ear fold starts with a reference crease down a diagonal. Fold two radial folds from opposite corners along the same side of the reference crease; the resulting flap should be folded downwards so that the previous edges are aligned.
- A petal fold starts with two connected flaps, each of which has at least two layers. (For example, two flaps of a preliminary base). The two flaps are attached to each other along a reference crease. Make two radial folds from the open point, so that the open edges lie along the reference crease. Unfold these two radial folds. Make another fold across the top connecting the ends of the creases to create a triangle of creases. Unfold this fold as well. Fold one layer of the open point upward and flatten it using the existing creases. A petal fold is equivalent to two side-by-side rabbit ears, which are connected along the reference crease.
Squash fold applied to one flap of a waterbomb base

Rabbit ear fold

Petal fold on one half of a preliminary fold

== Origami bases ==
In origami, there is a series of several bases that many models are created with. In general, "base" refers to any folded paper that immediately precedes final folding and shaping of the model-to-be. The ones listed below are generally accepted as the traditional origami bases.

- A blintz base is made by folding the corners of a square into the center, similar to the blintz pancake. The resulting square can then be used as the starting point for any base or blintzed again. The resulting base will then have more points available for folding.
- The kite base is merely two valley folds that bring two adjacent edges of the square together to lie on the square's diagonal.
- The fish base consists of two radial folds against a diagonal reference crease on each of two opposite corners. The flaps that result on the other two corners are carefully folded downwards in the same direction. In other words, it consists of two side-by-side rabbit ears.
- The waterbomb base consists of two perpendicular valley folds down the diagonals of the square and two perpendicular mountain folds down the center of the square. This crease pattern is then compressed to form the waterbomb base, which is an isosceles-right triangle with four isosceles-right triangular flaps. The waterbomb base is an inside-out preliminary fold.
- The preliminary fold consists of two perpendicular diagonal mountain folds that bisect the corners of the square and two perpendicular valley folds that bisect the edges of the square. The paper is then collapsed to form a square shape with four isosceles-right triangular flaps. It is sometimes called the Square Base
- The bird base, or crane base, consists of a preliminary fold with both the front and the back sides petal folded upward.
- The frog base starts with a waterbomb base or preliminary fold. All four flaps are squash-folded (the result is the same in either case), and then the corners are petal folded upward.
Blintz base

Kite base

Fish base

Water bomb base before flattening

Preliminary fold or Square Base

Bird base

== More advanced skills ==
- The Swivel fold is difficult to describe as the term is loosely defined and there are so many different versions that could be called "swivel folds". However, generally swivel folds involve a flap of paper "swivelling" at a certain point or vertex and another flap or edge of paper, connected to the first, dragged around that point or vertex.
- Most of the creases in a stretched bird base are present in the regular bird base. When forming this bird base, make sure to crease the triangle at the center corner through all layers. (If you unfold completely, you will see a small square at the center of the paper.) After forming the bird base, either partially unfold the paper, and/or "stretch" two opposite corners of the bird base. These two corners, their associated flaps, and the central square will all lie flat. The other two flaps will form a pyramid. Rabbit ear each flap that is in the pyramid, so that the model lies flat. All of the raw edges will lie along the centerline of the model. The stretched bird base is used in Lang's Bald Eagle, Greenberg's Eeyore, and some other high-intermediate and complex models.
- The open sink usually involves opening out the paper, and reversing creases to make a waterbomb base in the middle of the model.
- The open double sink is equivalent to making an open sink, and then open-sinking the point in the opposite direction. It is a sinked analog of the crimp fold. When made in a single step (after pre-creasing), it can be easier to make than a single open sink, because it does not require neatly reversing the point. The open double sink is used in many box-pleated models.
- The spread squash can similarly be considered the sinked analog of the squash fold. It is used to flatten a closed flap or twist fold (see below). Instead of creating a long point to one side of the flap's base, the spread squash creates a wide splat around the flap's base. The spread squash is used in the eyes of Engel's Octopus, in Marie's Rose, and in some other intermediate and complex models.
- The closed sink simultaneously makes a locking flap inside of a sink. It is difficult because the paper cannot be opened out further than a triangle. This technique is illustrated in the Origami Forum's thread #462. The closed sink appears in some high-intermediate and complex models.
- The twist fold involves, as the name implies, twisting a section of the paper with respect to its original position. The section twisted will be a polygon; the numerous required support creases include pleat folds radiating from its corners. Marie's Rose demonstrates this on a pentagon.
  - It is also possible to twist a single conical point indefinitely, collapsing the sides in a waterbomb-base-like fashion as one goes. (If this is tried with a non-conical point, such as the waterbomb base itself, eventually the fold will terminate in a spread squash.) This variant is used in many of Tomoko Fuse's modular boxes.
- Unsink, or sometimes open unsink, makes a concave pocket convex without fully unfolding the paper, or the opposite of an open sink. It is more difficult than the closed unsink below because there is no internal flap to grab onto to help unsink the paper, so the paper must be opened out and the area to be unsunk is pushed out (to be convex) from inside the model and from behind. It is a common fold in Lang's insects.
- The closed unsink inverts a closed sink without completely opening out the affected paper. In theory, it is "just" the opposite of a closed sink. In practice, it is very difficult, because the paper being "popped" into place usually must be pulled (not pushed), and because it involves simultaneously folding over a locking flap that is hidden inside the sink. However, it is easier to manipulate than an open unsink as there is an internal flap to pull to pop the unsink in place; in an open unsink there is nothing to hold. The closed unsink appears in some complex models, such as a few of Lang's insects.
