= Michael Shall =

Michael Shall (November 15, 1949 – February 9, 1995) was a teacher, practitioner, and promoter of origami (paper folding). He helped launch one of the largest American origami organizations, OrigamiUSA, in 1980.

== Life ==
Shall was born in 1949 and grew up in Carlisle, Pennsylvania. He was the youngest son of Tillie and Herman Shall, who taught his sons paperfolding. Michael Shall graduated from Lycoming College in Williamsport, Pennsylvania and taught high school English before moving to New York City in 1974 to try to make a living as an origami professional. Along with his mentor and colleague, Alice Gray, Shall is noted for his creation of Holiday/Christmas trees bedecked with origami. One of the best-known origami designs by Shall is his "Shining Alice", an eight-pointed star named in honor of Alice Gray. Shall is the author of the book Teaching Origami

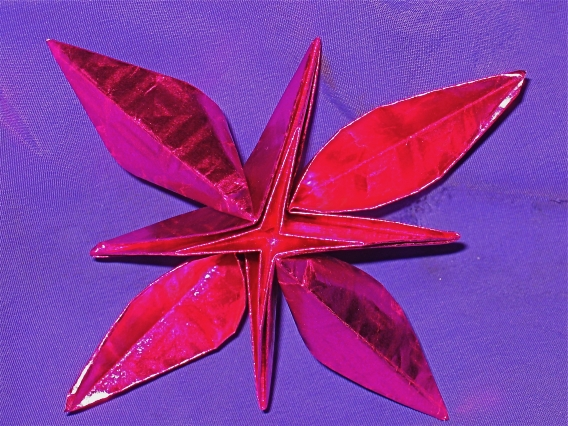
Shining Alice origami designed by Michael Shall

A history of the OrigamiUSA convention, which was started by Shall, describes him as a fine teacher and leader, resourceful, hospitable, energetic to the point of seeming hyperactive, but a poor planner. On one occasion, for example, he arranged for coffee cups and a coffee urn for the convention, but forgot the coffee.

In addition to teaching origami at The American Museum of Natural History in New York and the Smithsonian Institution in Washington, D.C., Shall "showed his dedication to spreading the magic found in a single sheet of paper by teaching in virtually every public library and countless schools in the New York City area."

Shall died on February 9, 1995, aged 45, at New York University Medical Center, from complications of AIDS. He is memorialized on a panel on block 04241 of the NAMES Project AIDS Memorial Quilt. The newsletter of OrigamiUSA for Summer, 1995, features 26 tribute articles dedicated to Shall. The organization created the Michael Shall Volunteer Recognition Award in 1995 to honor Shall and to recognize volunteers for extraordinary service to OrigamiUSA. A fund named after Shall provides origami paper for public projects, such as teaching origami at a senior center, or supporting a high school club on Long Island, NY as it folded Origami cranes for a local hospital. The 1995 OrigamiUSA convention was dedicated to Shall.
