= Sipho Mabona =

Swiss origami master

Sipho Mabona is a Swiss origami master. Mabona was the first-ever foreigner to have his work grace the cover of the official magazine of the Japan Origami Academic Society (JOAS) Convention in 2008. Mabona was commissioned by an advertising agency to create an origami stop-motion video for Japanese sports brand ASICS. The video won a Grand Prize at the Eurobest, gold at the New York festival, gold at the London International Awards, silver at the Clio in Miami and two times bronze at ADC Germany. He has made large origami models on display, for example, a giant origami elephant which he livestreamed. He raised US$25,000 to make it. He has also designed other animals, including a swallow, a rhino, and a crab, all folded from one square sheet of paper. Furthermore, he also designs models folded from money and papers with other dimensions, such as the origami locust, folded from a single dollar.
