= Wet-folding =

Origami technique

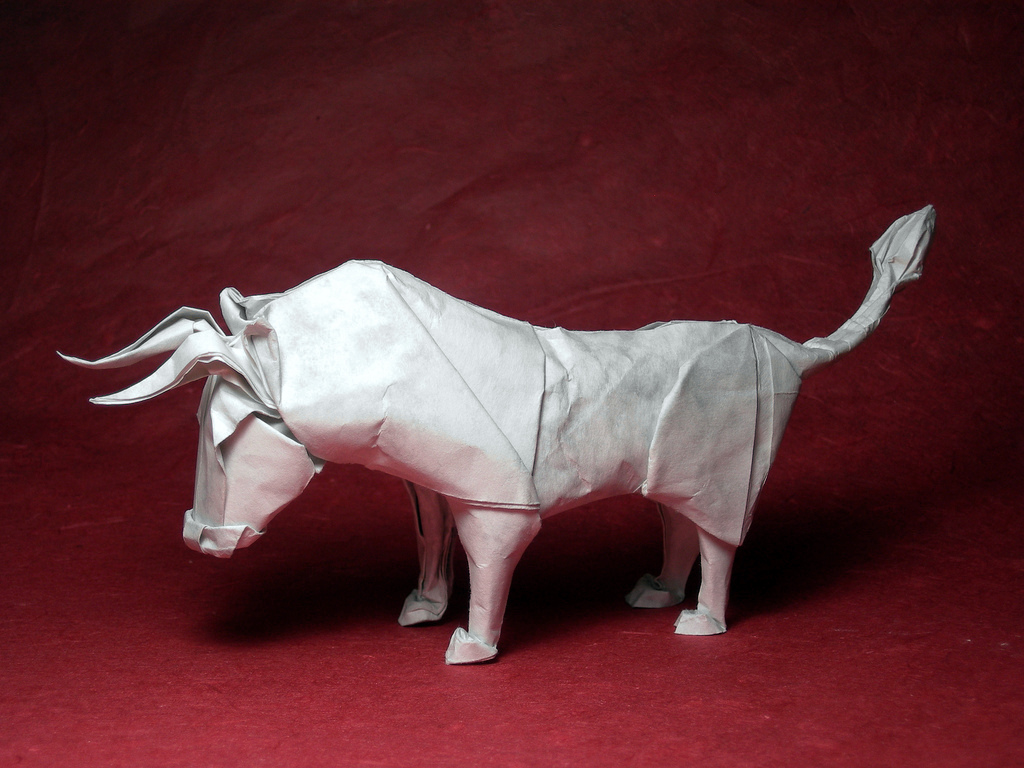
Wet-folded bull

Wet-folding is an origami technique developed by Akira Yoshizawa that employs water to dampen the paper so that it can be manipulated more easily. This process adds an element of sculpture to origami, which is otherwise purely geometric. Wet-folding is used very often by professional folders for non-geometric origami, such as animals. Wet-folders usually employ thicker paper than what would usually be used for normal origami, to ensure that the paper does not tear.

One of the most prominent users of the wet-folding technique was Éric Joisel, who specialized in origami animals, humans, and legendary creatures. He also created origami masks. Michael G. LaFosse also uses the wet-folding technique with specially made papers to create representations of the natural world.

The process of wet-folding allows a folder to preserve a curved shape more easily. It also reduces the number of wrinkles substantially. Wet-folding allows for increased rigidity and structure due to a process called sizing. Sizing is a water-soluble adhesive, usually methylcellulose or methyl acetate, that may be added during the manufacture of the paper. As the paper dries, the chemical bonds of the fibers of the paper tighten together which results in a crisper and stronger sheet. In order to moisten the paper, an artist typically wipes the sheet with a dampened cloth. The amount of moisture added to the paper is crucial because too little will cause the paper to dry quickly and spring back into its original position before the folding is complete, while too much will either fray the edges of the paper or will cause the paper to split at high-stress points.

== See also ==
- Papier-mâché
