= Florence Temko =

Florence Maria Temko (October 20, 1921 – November 12, 2009), a pioneer in spreading origami in the United States, was perhaps the most prolific author on this subject. With fifty-five books to her credit on paper arts and folk crafts, she was a strong influence on interested beginners in the art of paperfolding. Some of them later developed complex origami designs previously unimaginable and applied their expertise into advanced innovations in the fields of art and science.

== Early life ==
She was born Florence Maria Marx, in London, the daughter of Erich and Erna Marx. She studied at Wycombe Abbey, St. George's Business College and the London School of Economics, but her education was interrupted by World War II. She also studied at the New School for Social Research in New York.

== Personal life ==
She met US Army Sergeant Leonard Temko, and they married in 1945. In 1946, they settled in New Jersey and had three children: Joan A Temko, and twins Stephen Temko and Ronald Temko.

They divorced in 1968, and she married her second husband Henry Petzel in 1969. In 1982, they moved to San Diego, and divorced in the late 1990s.

== Later work ==
In the United States, the term kirigami was coined by Temko from Japanese kiri, 'cut', and kami, 'paper', in the title of her 1962 book, Kirigami, the Creative Art of Paper cutting. The book achieved enough success that the word kirigami was accepted as the Western name for the art of paper cutting.

Temko’s credits include audience participating lectures and workshops at the Metropolitan Museum of Art. She made two films for The National Film Board of Canada and BFA Educational Films. Florence authored 12 craft books including, in cooperation with the U.S. Committee for UNICEF, the book Folk Crafts For World Friendship (1976, illustrated by Yaroslava Surmach Mills) which describes crafts from many nations, including the craft's origin, customs relating to the craft and step-by-step instructions.

Her involvement as a consultant to the Mingei International Museum in San Diego, California, resulted in the mounting of the "Masterworks of Origami" exhibition there in 2003. Other museums in the United States and other countries subsequently recognized origami as an art form and set up their own exhibitions.

Her books continue to circulate well, especially in libraries, because readers find they can follow the clear step-by-step directions easily and there are various levels of complexity presented in each book. Among the many original origami designs created by her are some of the most popular: Rooster, Penguin, Star Bowl, Squawker Action Toy, Mortar Board Graduation Hat, Thanksgiving Turkey, and the Zig-Zag Sculpture.

She died on November 12, 2009, at her home in La Jolla, California.
