= Satoshi Kamiya =

Japanese origami artist

Satoshi Kamiya (神谷 哲史, Kamiya Satoshi; born June 6, 1981 in Nagoya, Japan) is a Japanese origami artist. He began folding paper in early childhood and was creating his own designs by the mid-1990s. His work often draws inspiration from manga, nature, and both Eastern and Western mythologies.

Kamiya has published three books. His first book is Works of Satoshi Kamiya, 1995-2003. It includes diagrams of nineteen models of intermediate through complex difficulty. Kamiya's second book, Works of Satoshi Kamiya 2, 2002-2009, released in 2012, includes 16 models and is a follow-up to his debut. Although most of these were previously published in convention books and magazines, it also includes new, previously unpublished diagrams for the famous feathered, long-tailed phoenix. In June 2019, Kamiya released a third volume of his designs. This book, Works of Satoshi Kamiya 3, contains models previously published in magazines and convention books, as well as models taught in origami classes, like his Tiger and Zero Fighter.

== Career ==
As a teenager, Kamiya competed on TV Tokyo’s TV Champion origami contests, where he won the “Origami TV Champion” title four times. His work has been featured internationally, including in the traveling exhibition Folding Paper: The Infinite Possibilities of Origami organized by the Japanese American National Museum.

== Publications ==
- Works of Satoshi Kamiya, 1995–2003. Origami House, 2005. OCLC 786062104, OCLC 875930368 (in Japanese)
- World of Super-Complex Origami. Soshimu, 2010. ISBN 978-4-88337-710-7 (with Komatsu Hideo and Takashi Hojyo)
- Works of Satoshi Kamiya 2, 2002–2009. Origami House, 2012.
- Works of Satoshi Kamiya 3. Origami House, 2019.
- Works of Satoshi Kamiya 4. Origami House, 2026.

== Style and notable works ==
Kamiya is regarded as a leading figure in the development of "super-complex" origami, producing multi-hundred-step models that often require large sheets of thin paper. His work is noted for its combination of technical precision and lifelike detail, and he frequently depicts animals, insects, and mythological creatures.

Among his best-known models is Ryūjin 3.5, an elaborate Chinese dragon design first completed in 2006. It has been described as “the pinnacle of the field,” featuring a curly tongue, horns, whiskers, and thousands of individually folded scales, with the folding process itself taking more than forty hours. Other notable works include the Ancient Dragon and the Divine Dragon (Bahamut), both of which require several hundred steps and are often cited as landmarks in contemporary complex origami.

Discover magazine also noted that Kamiya had begun designing original sculptures by age 10, published his first collection in his early twenties, and developed unusually thin and strong handmade paper to support his most intricate creations.

== See also ==
- Mathematics of origami
