= Alice Gray =

American entomologist and origamist (1914–1994)

- Gray working on insect models at the American Museum of Natural History
- Born: June 7, 1914
- Died: April 27, 1994 (aged 79); Norwalk, Connecticut, U.S.
- Education: Cornell University; Teachers College, Columbia University
- Scientific career
- Fields: Entomology; origami
- Workplaces: American Museum of Natural History

Alice E. Gray (June 7, 1914 – April 27, 1994) was an American entomologist and origamist. She worked as an entomologist at the American Museum of Natural History (AMNH) in New York for 43 years, writing, illustrating, and creating large models of insects. Known as the "Bug Lady", she conducted outreach and education in the museum, brought specimens to local schools, and appeared on The Tonight Show. She began practicing origami first as an extension of her interest in insects, starting a tradition of using origami creatures to decorate the museum's Christmas tree. In the 1960s, she became more involved with the origami community and, in 1978, co-founded the Friends of the Origami Center of America in New York with Lillian Oppenheimer and Michael Shall, now known as OrigamiUSA.

== Early life and education ==
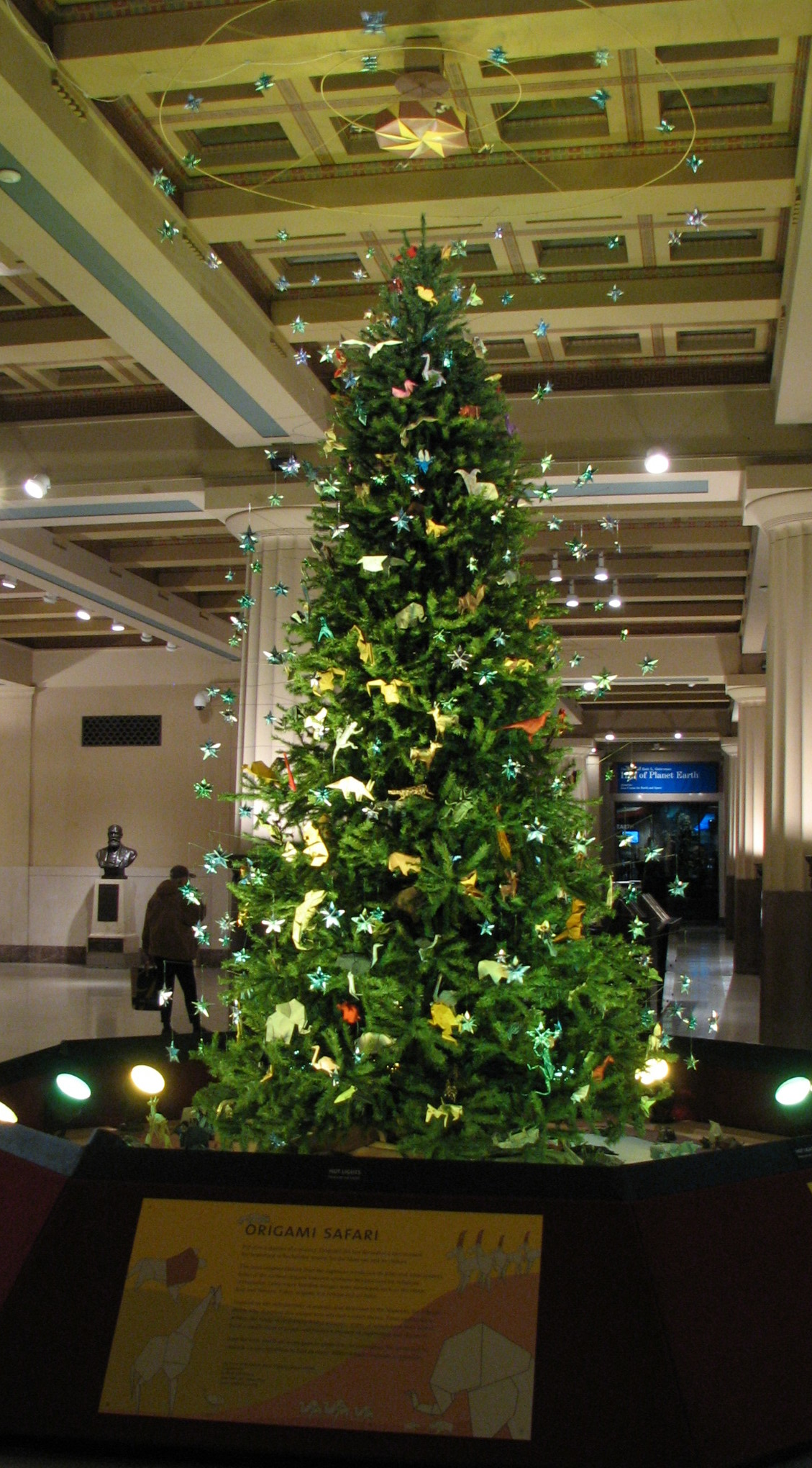
Origami Christmas tree at the Museum of Natural History, a tradition Gray started

Alice E. Gray was born on June 7, 1914. Her mother came from a farming family and her father was an engineer. She was interested by insects as a child. Her mother, when asked by Alice to keep insects she had caught, agreed under the condition that Alice learn what they ate by dinnertime, leading her to become an amateur entomologist at a young age. While still in high school, she knew she wanted to work at the American Museum of Natural History, and called its Insects and Spiders Department to ask about employment. Based on the advice she received from then-chairman, Frank E. Lutz, she applied to and attended Cornell University, studying biology and entomology, and training in scientific illustration.

== American Museum of Natural History ==
Upon graduating from Cornell in 1937, she started work with the museum and remained there until she retired. She proved to be a skilled illustrator, modeler, and writer, and engaged in a range of public relations and communications activities. She wrote for museum publications, constructed many of the department's displays, built large models, and illustrated entomology handouts still used as of 2016.

One of her projects was the creation of large-scale models of insects that she called "model monsters". She explained her modeling process and purpose in a lengthy article in Mechanix Illustrated in 1945. The first such model she created took six months to produce, taking pains to ensure its accuracy. "A well-made model is both a text and treasure ... Of the hundreds of people who daily pass these models in the museum, many never see them. Others take one glance and gulp and run. There are some, however, who look, see and remember that it is for them that all museum modeling is done." She cited a flea as one example of her work: "A flea made large enough to serve six at dinner by the lens of the microscope, stands revealed as most admirably streamlined and thus enabled to slip unimpeded between hairs."

She continued her own education while employed at the museum, earning a Master of Science in Education from Teachers College in 1949. As Scientific Assistant in the Department of Entomology, Gray was the primary educator and communicator on the subject of insects. In addition to working inside the museum, she was the director of the New York Entomological Society's Junior Division and brought insects and spiders out to New York public schools, presenting in classrooms and eventually earning the nickname "Bug Lady" through her outreach efforts. She appeared with her insects on television in the 1960s and 1970s, including an episode of The Tonight Show.

== Origami ==
Gray's first encounter with origami was when she purchased a book on the subject based on a picture of a cicada on the cover. She took to it as a hobby, but her interest deepened after meeting Lillian Oppenheimer in the 1960s. Oppenheimer is credited with popularizing origami in the United States, and Gray saw in her collection an art and craft that could be taken seriously. Gray offered to taxonomize and organize the collection, in a project that soon after was the cover story of the Origamian. In 1964, when both the editor and art director of that magazine left their positions, Gray filled in for both, first as a temporary measure and later on a permanent basis.

In 1978 she co-founded, with Oppenheimer and Michael Shall, the non-profit Friends of the Origami Center of America in New York. She gained international recognition for her work developing models, writing books, and generally supporting the paperfolding community. Gray secured an office for the society inside the museum which it continues to occupy as of 2016. Its name changed to OrigamiUSA when Oppenheimer died in 1992, and it remains the largest origami organization in the United States.

Folding paper to create toys and models of insects also became part of her work at the museum. She introduced the idea of using her origami insects to decorate a Christmas tree in the museum, starting with a small tree in her office, using folded envelope linings. When it caught the attention of the Trustee Exhibition Committee, the AMNH Holiday Origami Tree became an annual tradition, still active as of 2016. What began as a small tree decorated with folded envelope linings grew into a large tree with about 1,000 origami pieces, including not just insects but origami representations of many areas of the museum.

When Japan Publications looked to create a beginners' origami book for American schoolchildren, it recruited Gray to work with Japanese artist Kunihiko Kasahara on what would become The Magic of Origami, released in 1977 with Oppenheimer credited as photographer. An origami butterfly named "The Alice" was dedicated to Gray by artist Michael LaFosse in 1992.

== Later life ==
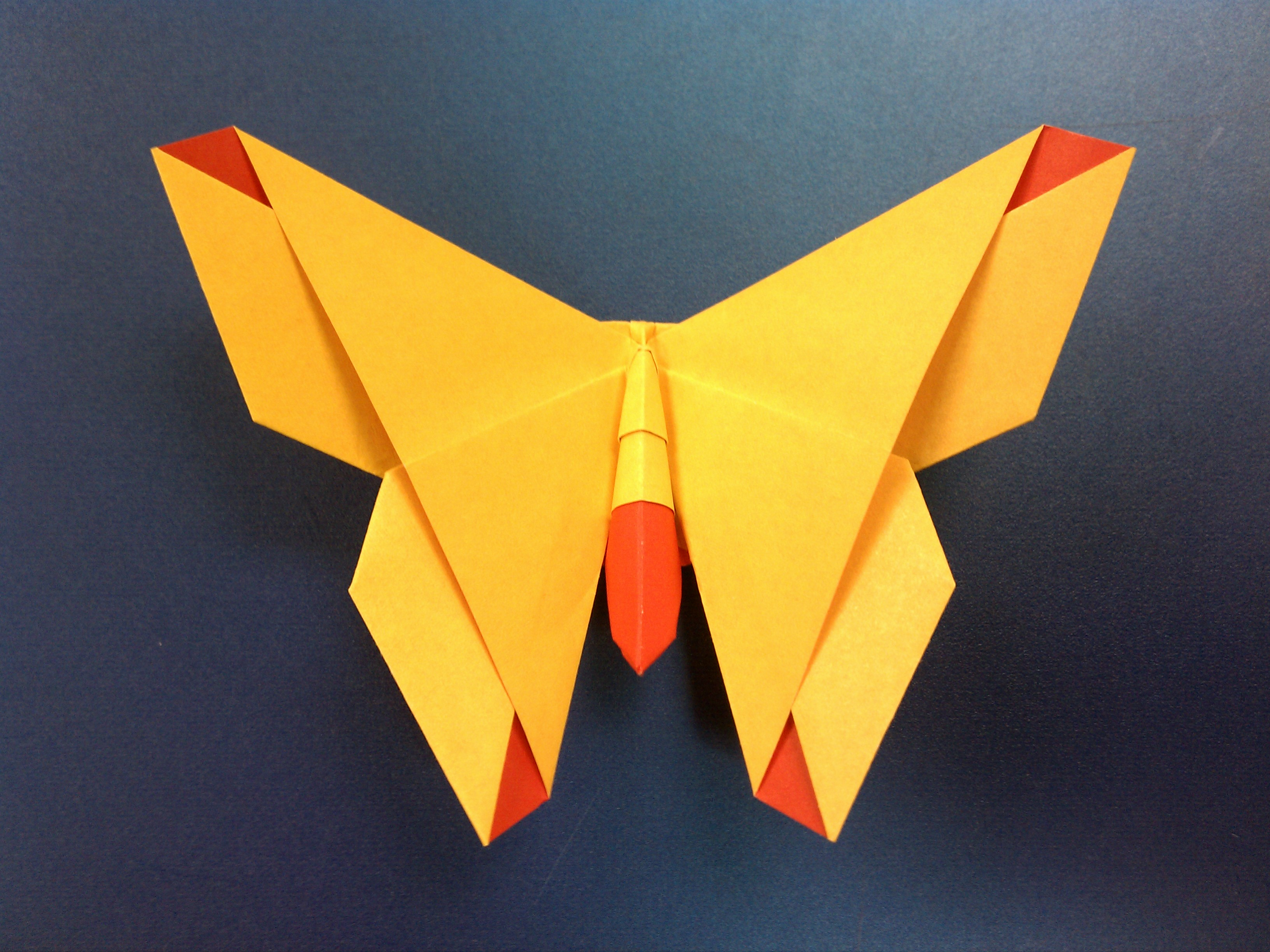
The Alice, an origami butterfly design named after Gray

Gray retired from the museum in 1980, after 43 years, but remained involved as a volunteer. The next year, she was given the title "scientific assistant emeritus". Among other activities, she continued to help with public communications and participated in the creation of origami insects for the museum's Christmas tree. She also continued to be active in origami communities, serving as the president of the Friends of the Origami Center of America from 1985 to 1989. She died in Norwalk, Connecticut, on April 27, 1994, at the age of 79.
