= Norio Torimoto =

Japanese origami artist

Norio Torimoto (Japanese: 鳥本 範雄, born 1948 in Japan) is one of the best-known representatives of origami art. Since 1971, he has been represented in museums, exhibitions and participated in other events where Japanese culture has been the focus. Torimoto now lives in Sweden.

== Recognition ==
Torimoto was recognized for his art in 1991 at Nippon Origami Association World Exhibition. Torimoto was appointed Origami Master by Nippon Origami Association, one of nine in the world, on New Years Day, 2000. Torimoto has been involved in origami projects around the world in countries like the US, Hungary, China, Poland, Latvia, Italy, Germany and Sweden.

== Professional accomplishments ==
In 1987, Torimoto was commissioned to create an origami panda, symbol of World Wildlife Foundation (WWF). He had the honor to present the panda to his majesty, King Carl XVI Gustaf of Sweden.

Extremely interested in mathematics, Torimoto lectures at The Royal Institute of Technology in Stockholm, several universities in Japan, Denmark, and the UK, with topics like “Origami – Geometric solution as visual tactile perception”. Torimoto also spends his days teaching both teachers and young kids advanced mathematics through his origami.

He designed the cover art for 2009 Eniro telephone catalogs in Sweden. Among his origami creations you will find figures like Pippi Longstocking, Björn Borg, Boris Yeltsin, Olof Palme, as well as the former Swedish Prime Minister Göran Persson.

With Yukiko Duke, he coauthored Origami: a complete step-by-step guide to making animals, flowers, planes, boats, and more, Skyhorse Publishing 2012 ISBN 978-1616085766.
