= James Sakoda =

American psychologist

James Minoru Sakoda
- Born: April 21, 1916; Lancaster, California, U.S.
- Died: June 12, 2005 (aged 89)
- Occupation: Psychologist

James Sakoda (April 21, 1916 – June 12, 2005) was a Japanese-American psychologist, computational modeler, and origami artist. He is best known for his early development of what is now called agent-based modeling in the social sciences. Sakoda was incarcerated during World War II in U.S. internment camps, an experience that informed his doctoral work. He later became a professor at several American universities and contributed extensively to both psychology and computational social science.

== Career ==
Sakoda was born in Lancaster, California in 1916.

During World War II, Sakoda spent time incarcerated at the Tule Lake and Minidoka internment camps. He documented the experiences of Japanese Americans in internment camps, using what may be the first "agent-based model." In 1949, he published a dissertation based on his research. As a result, he earned a psychology Ph.D. from the University of California, Berkeley, that year.

After the war, Sakoda pursued a career in psychology and teaching. He taught at Brooklyn College, before joining the psychology department at the University of Connecticut in 1958. In 1962, he joined the sociology department at Brown University and became the director of the Social Science Computer Laboratory.

== Origami ==
Outside of academia, Sakoda was a well-known figure in the field of origami. He published two books on the subject He published two books on the subject: ''Modern Origami'' (1969) and ''Origami Flowers'' (1992). They were republished in 1997 and 1999, respectively.
