= OrigamiUSA =

USA-based origami organization

- Abbreviation: OUSA
- Predecessor: Friends of the Origami Center of America
- Formation: 1980; 46 years ago
- Type: Nonprofit
- Location: New York City, United States
- Website: origamiusa.org

OrigamiUSA (sometimes abbreviated as "OUSA") is the largest origami organization in the United States, with offices located at the American Museum of Natural History in New York City. It was founded in 1980 by Michael Shall, Alice Gray, Lillian Oppenheimer, Robert E. Neale, and others as the Friends of the Origami Center of America and was renamed OrigamiUSA on July 1, 1994. Since its founding, OrigamiUSA has been fully non-profit and volunteer-based and is a 501(c)(3) corporation. OrigamiUSA organizes the largest origami convention in the world each June in New York City, and in addition publishes a magazine, The Paper, an annual collection of origami diagrams, and a website, and also provides educational materials and supports numerous other activities that spread the art of origami.

== Mission ==
The mission statement is the following: "OrigamiUSA's mission is to share the joy and appreciation of paperfolding, preserve its history, nurture its growth, bring people together, and encourage community among paperfolders."

== Services and activities ==
OrigamiUSA provides a variety of services to its members and to the world origami community:

- Annual Convention: typically held on the last full weekend of June at St. John's University in Queens, New York since 2016, Annual Convention is the largest origami convention in the world. Prior venues were Fashion Institute of Technology and Manhattan College in New York City. It is attended by some 800 people each year and provides typically 30 parallel sessions of origami instructional classes for an entire weekend, as well as special seminars on design and folding techniques. Special guests attend every year from far off-places; previous guests include Kade Chan from Hong Kong, Tomoko Fuse from Japan, Nick Robinson from the United Kingdom, and Toshikazu Kawasaki from Japan.
- The Paper: the print magazine of OrigamiUSA, The Paper is published roughly quarterly for all members, contains articles about origami activities and new, unpublished diagrams. Members receive The Paper by mail.
- The Fold: the online magazine of OrigamiUSA, The Fold publishes continuously throughout the year, with new articles averaging once a week. OrigamiUSA publishes this magazine for members and visitors with a mix of members-only and open-access content consisting of articles, diagrams, videos, animations, and more.
- The Origami Collection: a book of diagrams published annually for the latest creations by folders from around the world.
- Special Folding Fun Sessions: six one-day special sessions of origami instruction, held at the American Museum of Natural History. Each session is one day, with both morning and afternoon sessions.
- The Source: an online (or mail-in) origami one-stop shop, selling common and hard-to-find origami books, videos, CDs, paper and other supplies.
- Reference Library: a visitation-only reference library, housed at the American Museum of Natural History, where rare and out-of-print materials may be examined.
- Lending Library: A lending-by-mail library, whereby members can borrow origami books by mail for a nominal fee.
- Origami by Children: an annual competition that allows children eighteen and under to submit their models for exhibition across the country. Children whose works are selected to be exhibited will win various prizes, including a free year's subscription to OrigamiUSA's print magazine, The Paper.
- Holiday Tree: a tree decorated with hundreds of origami figures sent in by OrigamiUSA members and origami aficionados from all over the world which is displayed in the rotunda of the American Museum of Natural History. which has become an annual tradition in New York City, each year decorated with hundreds of origami figures.
- Website: OrigamiUSA's official website containing information about the organization, diagrams, and registration information for the various conventions and folding sessions sponsored by the organization.
- Pacific Coast Origami Convention (PCOC): held in odd-numbered years in various places along the West Coast of North America in concert with a local organizing origami group in the host city; convention site changes. Past convention locations include Phoenix, Vancouver, San Francisco, Bellevue, Albuquerque, and Boulder.
- World Origami Days: a 2 1/2-week celebration of the international community of origami World Origami Days is held each year from October 24–November 11, with the goal of making origami as visible as possible by teaching a class, folding on the bus, giving origami to friends, exhibiting your models, etc. October 24 is the birthday of Lillian Oppenheimer (1898–1992), who founded the first origami group in America. She was also one of the founders of the British Origami Society and OrigamiUSA. A dynamic woman, she was delighted in the magic to be found in a piece of paper and wanted to share it with the world. November 11 is Origami Day in Japan, where the origami crane has become a symbol of peace.

Special Conventions

OrigamiUSA has sponsored several conventions in the past on an irregular basis:

- The 2nd Conference on Copyright in Origami in 2009 in New York City
- The 4th International Conference on Origami in Science, Mathematics, and Education in 2006 in Pasadena, CA
- The 3rd International Conference on Origami in Science, Mathematics, and Education in 2001 in Monterey, CA
- The Conference on Origami in Education and Teaching (COET) in 1991 and 1995

== Board of directors ==
The OrigamiUSA Board of Directors is elected annually, with members serving staggered two-year terms. Elections occur in the weeks leading up to Annual Convention, with results announced during the Annual Meeting, which occurs during Annual Convention.

Current board officers (2016) are:

- Chair: Jason Ku
- Vice Chair: Patty Grodner
- Treasurer: Michael Montebello
- Secretary: Kathleen Sheriden
- President/CEO: Wendy Zeichner

Current board members (2023) are:

- Patty Grodner (2022–2024)
- David Kandel (2022–2024)
- Marc Kirschenbaum (2022–2024)
- Michael Montebello (2022–2024)
- Mel Sawyer (2022–2024)
- Jason Schneider (2022–2024)
- Jason Ku (2023–2025)
- Kathleen Sheridan (2023–2025)
- Edith Kort (2023–2025)
- Rowen Pierick (2023–2025)
- Alex Matthews (2023–2025)
- Wendy Zeichner (ex officio)
