= British Origami Society =

The British Origami Society is a registered charity (no. 293039), devoted to the art of origami (paper folding). The Society has 700 members worldwide and publishes a bi-monthly magazine called "British Origami". They also have a library which is one of the world's largest collections of Origami resources, containing well over 4000 books, and a similar quantity of magazines, journals, convention packs and catalogues. As stated in the constitution of the society, its aims are, "to advance public education in the art of Origami and to promote the study and practice of Origami in education and as a means of therapy for the relief of people who are sick or mentally or physically handicapped". The society was founded at its inaugural meeting held at The Russell Hotel in London 28 October 1967. It was formed from the Origami Portfolio Society which had been founded in 1965. The first president of the new society was Robert Harbin, a noted British magician and author. Later, another notable president was Alfred Bestall, who had been writer and illustrator of Rupert Bear for the London Daily Express, from 1935 to 1965.

The Society created the Sydney French medal to honour recipients for outstanding services to origami. The first recipient was David Brill in 1992.
