= Akira Yoshizawa =

Japanese origamist

- 吉澤 章
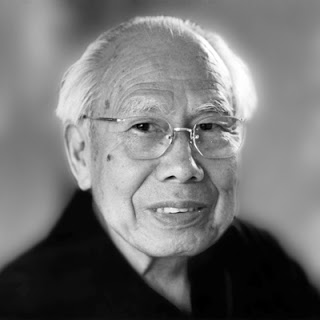
- Born: Akira Yoshizawa; 14 March 1911; Kaminokawa, Japan
- Died: 14 March 2005 (aged 94); Itabashi, Japan
- Occupations: Artist, author
- Known for: Origami
- Awards: Order of the Rising Sun

Akira Yoshizawa (吉澤 章, Yoshizawa Akira; 14 March 1911 – 14 March 2005) was a Japanese origamist, considered to be the grandmaster of origami. He is credited with raising origami from a craft to a living art. According to his own estimation made in 1989, he created more than 50,000 models, of which only a few hundred designs were presented as diagrams in his 18 books. Yoshizawa acted as an international cultural ambassador for Japan throughout his career. In 1983, Emperor Hirohito awarded him the Order of the Rising Sun, 5th class, one of the highest honors bestowed in Japan.

== Life ==
Yoshizawa was born on 14 March 1911, in Kaminokawa, Japan, to the family of a dairy farmer. When he was a child, he took pleasure in teaching himself origami. He moved into a factory job in Tokyo when he was 13 years old. His passion for origami was rekindled in his early 20s, when he was promoted from factory worker to technical draftsman. His new job was to teach junior employees geometry. Yoshizawa used the traditional art of origami to understand and communicate geometrical problems.

In 1937, he left factory work to pursue origami full-time. During the next 20 years, he lived in total poverty, earning his living by door-to-door selling of tsukudani (a Japanese preserved condiment that is usually made of seaweed). During World War II, Yoshizawa served in the army medical corps in Hong Kong. He made origami models to cheer up the sick patients, but eventually fell ill himself and was sent back to Japan. His origami work was creative enough to be included in the 1944 book Origami Shuko, by Isao Honda (本多 功). However, it was his work for the January 1952 issue of the magazine Asahi Graph that launched his career, which included the 12 zodiac signs commissioned by a magazine.

In 1954, his first monograph, Atarashii Origami Geijutsu (New Origami Art) was published. In this work, he established the Yoshizawa–Randlett system of notation for origami folds (a system of symbols, arrows and diagrams), which has become the standard for most paperfolders. The publishing of this book helped Yoshizawa out of his poverty. It was followed closely by his founding of the International Origami Centre in Tokyo in 1954, when he was 43.

His first overseas exhibition was organized in October 1955 by Gershon Legman, a leading player in the early years of the origami movement. The exhibition was held at the Stedelijk Museum in Amsterdam. Felix Tikotin, a Dutch dealer, acted as a liaison.

Yoshizawa lent many of his own origami models to other exhibitions around the world. He would never sell his origami figures, but rather gave them away as gifts to people, and let other groups and organizations borrow them for exhibiting.

His second wife, Kiyo Yoshizawa, served as his manager and taught origami to the other patients where he was hospitalized until his death.

== Technique ==
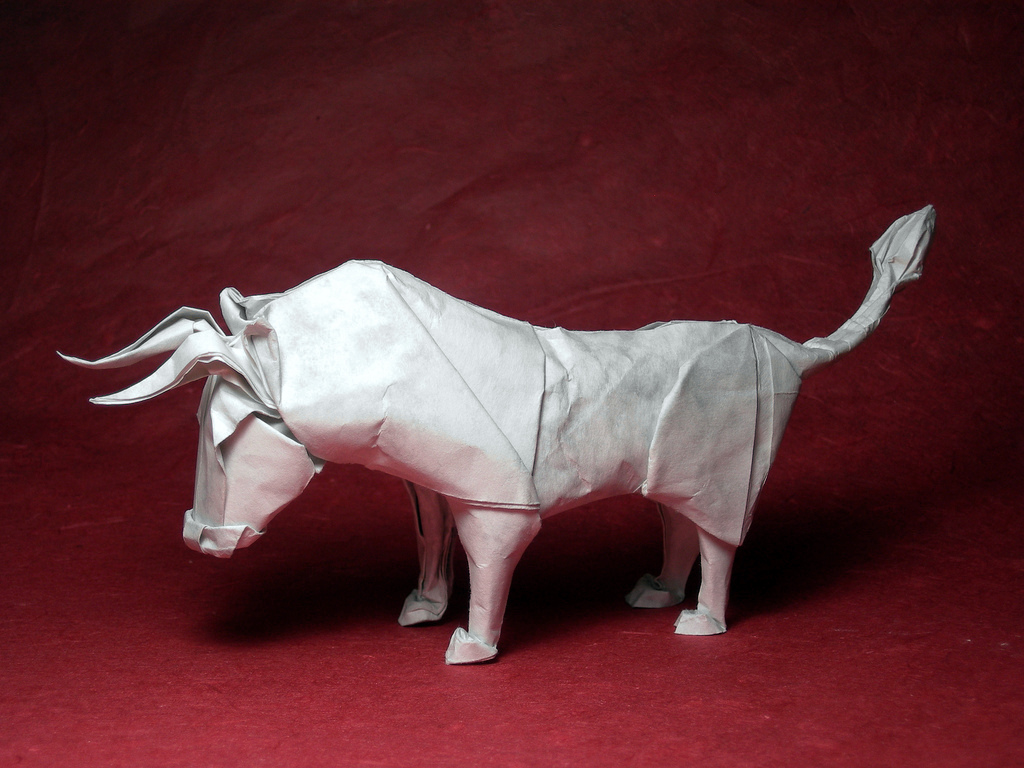
A wet-folded origami bull

Although Yoshizawa pioneered many different origami techniques, wet-folding is one of his most significant contributions. This technique involves slightly dampening the paper before making a fold. Wet-folding allows the paper to be manipulated more easily, resulting in finished origami models that have a rounder and more sculpted look.

Wet-folding is most often used with thicker paper; normal origami paper is very thin and thus prone to tearing when using the wet-folding technique. Yoshizawa believed the process was the most important part. He is credited as saying, "When you fold, the ritual and the act of creation is more important than the final result. When your hands are busy your heart is serene".

== Later years ==
In March 1998, Yoshizawa was invited to exhibit his origami in the Carrousel du Louvre in France. Although he had previously disliked his contemporaries, he was not opposed to having his photo taken with them. Many of his patterns had been diagrammed by his professional rivals, which angered Yoshizawa when he was younger. However, as he had aged, he found that he now enjoyed the company of his peers.

Yoshizawa died on 14 March 2005 in a hospital in Itabashi, Tokyo, of complications from pneumonia, on his 94th birthday.

After his death, he was featured in Between the Folds, a documentary about origami that called him the father of modern, sculptural approaches to origami.

== Books ==
- Atarashii Origami Geijutsu, Origami Geijutsu-Sha 1954
- Origami Reader I, Ryokuchi-Sha 1957
- Dokuhon, Vol. 1 (Origami Tokuhon), 1973, ISBN 4-8216-0408-6
- Sosaku Origami (Creative Origami), Nippon Hoso Kyokai 1984, ISBN 4-14-031028-6
- Dokuhon, Vol. 2 (Origami Tokuhon), 1986
- Origami Dokuhon II (Origami Reader II), Kamakura Shobo 1986, ISBN 4-308-00400-4
- Origami: Living Nature, 1996, ISBN 9784916096319
