= Robert Harbin =

British magician and author (1908–1978)

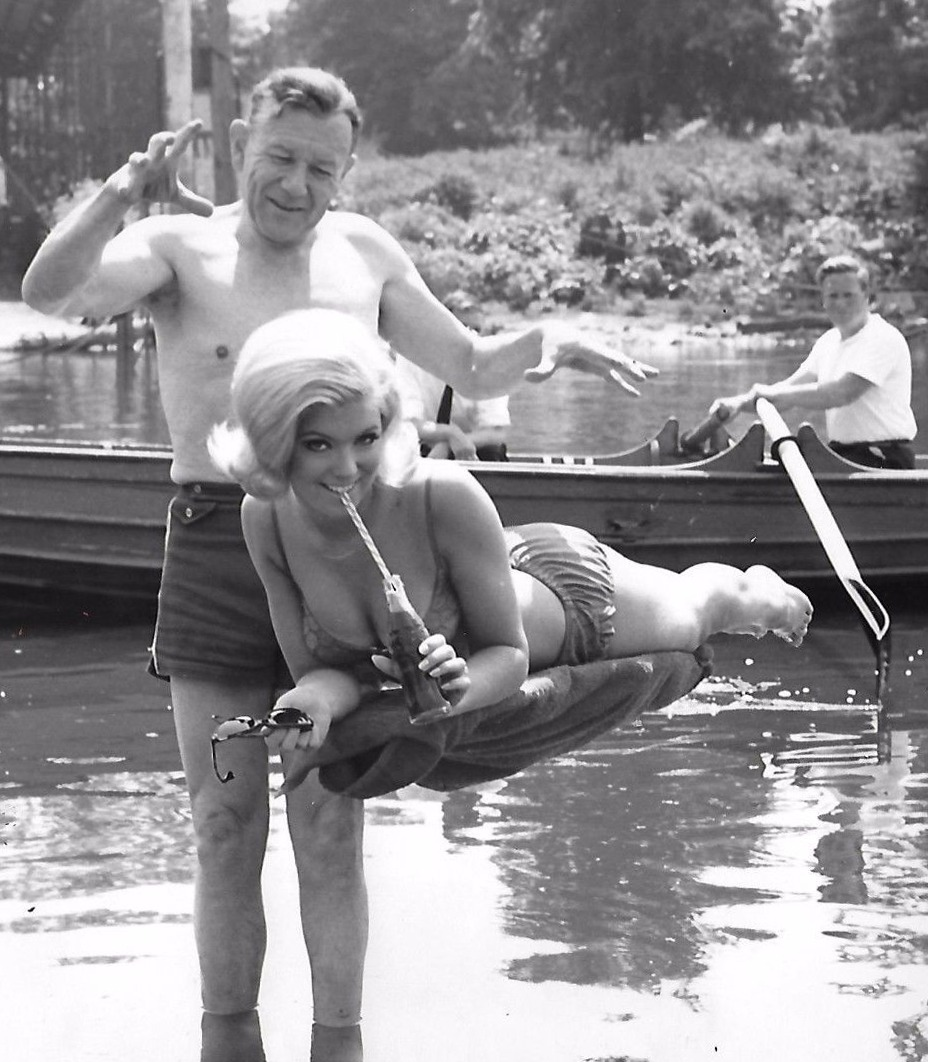
- Harbin levitates actress Marvyn Parkes in 1966
- Born: Edward Richard Charles Williams; 12 February 1908; Balfour, South Africa
- Died: 12 January 1978 (aged 69); Westminster, London, England
- Occupation: Magician

Robert Harbin (born Edward Richard Charles Williams; 12 February 1908 – 12 January 1978) was a South African-born magician and author. He is noted as the inventor of a number of classic illusions, including the Zig Zag Girl. He also became an authority on origami.

== Career ==
The young Edward first got interested in magic after an unknown ex-serviceman appeared at his school with a magic show later described as "rather poor". Williams came to London at the age of 20 and began by working in the magic department of Gamages toy shop. He began performing in music halls under the title "Ned Williams, the Boy Magician from South Africa". By 1932 he was appearing in the Maskelyne's Mysteries magic show in various London theatres. He was the first British illusionist to move from stage performing to television, appearing in the BBC TV show Variety in 1937 and numerous times after the war when the BBC resumed broadcasting. He developed a number of new tricks, including the Neon Light and the now ubiquitous Zig Zag Girl. His lesser known inventions include the Aztec Lady, The Blades of Opah, and Aunt Matilda's Wardrobe.

Much of his work was put into written form, and he authored numerous texts on magic. However, although Harbin created many magic effects, his associate Eric C. Lewis stated that many of Harbin's titles were ghostwritten for him.

In 1953 Harbin appeared in a minor part as a magician in the film The Limping Man, produced by Cy Endfield. In 1953, Harbin and a friend of Endfield, Gershon Legman (1917–1999), discovered a common interest in the Japanese art of paper-folding. Harbin wrote many books on the subject, beginning with Paper Magic (illustrated by the young art student, the Australian Rolf Harris who in the middle of the project, caught the origami idea and contributed several intricate models himself) in 1956, and was the first President of the British Origami Society. He was the first Westerner to use the word origami for this art-form. He also presented a series of origami programmes for ITV in its "Look-In" magazines for children in the 1970s as well as on screen.

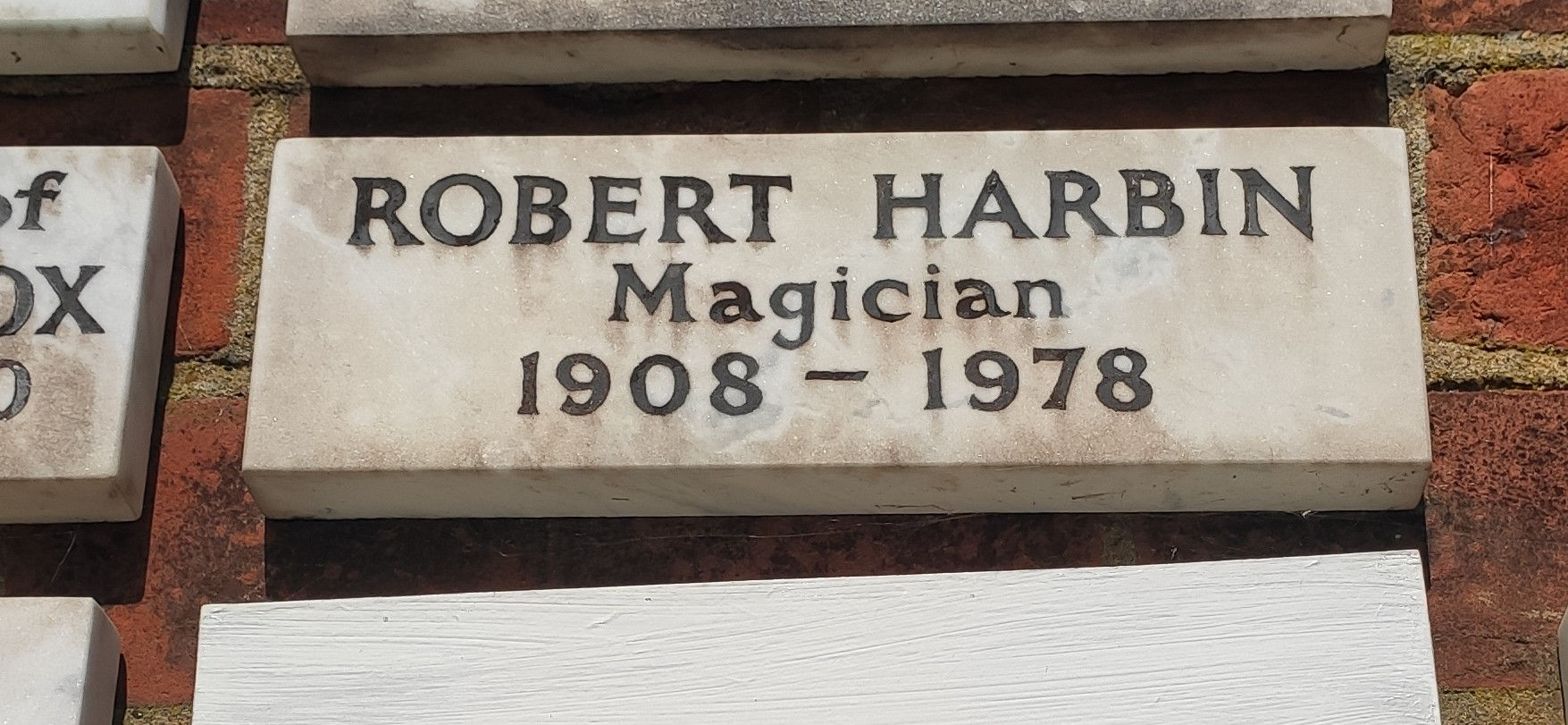
Commemorative plaque at Golders Green Crematorium

There is a commemorative plaque dedicated to Harbin at Golders Green Crematorium in London.

== Publications ==
=== On origami ===
- Paper Magic: The art of paper folding, Oldbourne, 1956, ASIN B0000CJG8R
- Paper Folding Fun, Oldbourne, 1960, ASIN B0000CKUYQ
- Secrets of Origami, old and new: The Japanese art of paper-folding, Oldbourne, 1963, ASIN B0000CM4YW
- Teach Yourself Origami, Hodder, 1968, ISBN 0-340-05972-9
- Origami 1: The Art of Paper-Folding, Coronet, 1969, ISBN 0-340-10902-5
- More Origami, The art of paper-folding no.2, Hodder, 1971, ISBN 0-340-15384-9
- Origami 2: The Art of Paper-Folding, Coronet, 1971, ISBN 0-340-15384-9
- Origami 3: The Art of Paper-Folding, Coronet Books/Hodder, 1972, ISBN 0-340-16655-X
- Secrets of Origami, Octopus, 1972, ISBN 0-7064-0005-4
- Origami: Art of Paper Folding (Teach Yourself), Hodder, 1973, ISBN 0-340-16646-0
- Origami - A Step by Step Guide, Hamlyn, 1974, ISBN 0-600-38109-9
- Have Fun with Origami, ITV, 1975, ISBN 0-900727-26-8
- Origami: Art of Paper Folding (Illustrated Teach Yourself), Picture Knight, 1975, ISBN 0-340-19381-6
- Origami A/H, Hodder Arnold, 1976, ISBN 0-340-27950-8
- Origami 4, Robert Harbin, 1977, ISBN 0-340-21822-3
- Have Fun with Origami, Severn Ho., 1977, ISBN 0-7278-0225-9
- Origami: Art of Paper Folding (Coronet Books), Hodder Headline Australia, 1977, ISBN 0-340-21822-3
- New Adventures in Origami, 1982, Harper & Row, ISBN 0-06-463555-4

=== On magic ===
- Something New in Magic, Davenport, 1929
- Psychic Vision, Davenport, 1930
- Six Card Creations, Davenport, 1930
- Demon Magic, Davenport, 1938
- How to Be a Wizard, Oldbourne, 1957, ASIN B0000CJUT3
- How to Be a Conjuror, Sphere, 1968, ISBN 0-7221-4322-2
- Magic of Robert Harbin, C.W. Mole and Sons, 1970 – This was published with a run of only 500 copies, after which Harbin had the plates destroyed.
- Magic (Illustrated Teach yourself), Treasure, 1983, ISBN 0-907812-39-2
- Magic (Illustrated Teach Yourself), Knight, 1976, ISBN 0-340-20502-4
- The Harbin Book, M. Breese, 1983, ISBN 0-947533-00-1
- Harbincadabra, brainwaves and brainstorms of Robert Harbin [i.e. N. Williams]: From the pages of Abracadabra, 1947–1965, R. Harbin
- Magic Marches On (Harbin's fabled "Lost Book") included in Davenport Story Series – Vol 2, Davenport

=== Other subjects ===
- Waddington's Family Card Games, Elm Tree, 1972, ISBN 0-241-02111-1
- Waddington's Family Card Games, Pan, 1974, ISBN 0-330-23892-2
- Party Lines, Oldbourne, 1963, ASIN B0000CLQIH
- Instant Memory: The Way to Success, Corgi, 1968, ISBN 0-552-06091-7
