= Big-little-big lemma =

Theorem about origami

In the mathematics of paper folding, the big-little-big lemma is a necessary condition for a crease pattern with specified mountain folds and valley folds to be able to be folded flat. It differs from Kawasaki's theorem, which characterizes the flat-foldable crease patterns in which a mountain-valley assignment has not yet been made. Together with Maekawa's theorem on the total number of folds of each type, the big-little-big lemma is one of the two main conditions used to characterize the flat-foldability of mountain-valley assignments for crease patterns that meet the conditions of Kawasaki's theorem. Mathematical origami expert Tom Hull calls the big-little-big lemma "one of the most basic rules" for flat foldability of crease patterns.

== Statement ==
The lemma concerns the angles made by consecutive pairs of creases at a single vertex of the crease pattern. It states that if any one of these angles is a local minimum (that is, smaller than the two angles on either side of it), then exactly one of the two creases bounding the angle must be a mountain fold and exactly one must be a valley fold.

== Generalization and applications ==
A generalized version of the lemma holds for a sequence of equal angles at a single vertex, surrounded on both sides by a larger angle. For such a sequence, the number of mountain and valley folds bounding any of these angles must either be equal, or differ by one. It can be used as part of a linear time algorithm that tests whether a folding pattern with a single vertex can be folded flat, by repeatedly looking for sequences of angles that obey the lemma and pinching them off, until either getting stuck or reducing the input to two equal angles bounded by two creases of the same type as each other.

== History ==
In their book Geometric Folding Algorithms, Erik Demaine and Joe O'Rourke credit the lemma to publications of Toshikazu Kawasaki in 1989, and Jacques Justin in 1994.
