= Yoshimura buckling =

Pattern of buckling used in mechanical engineering

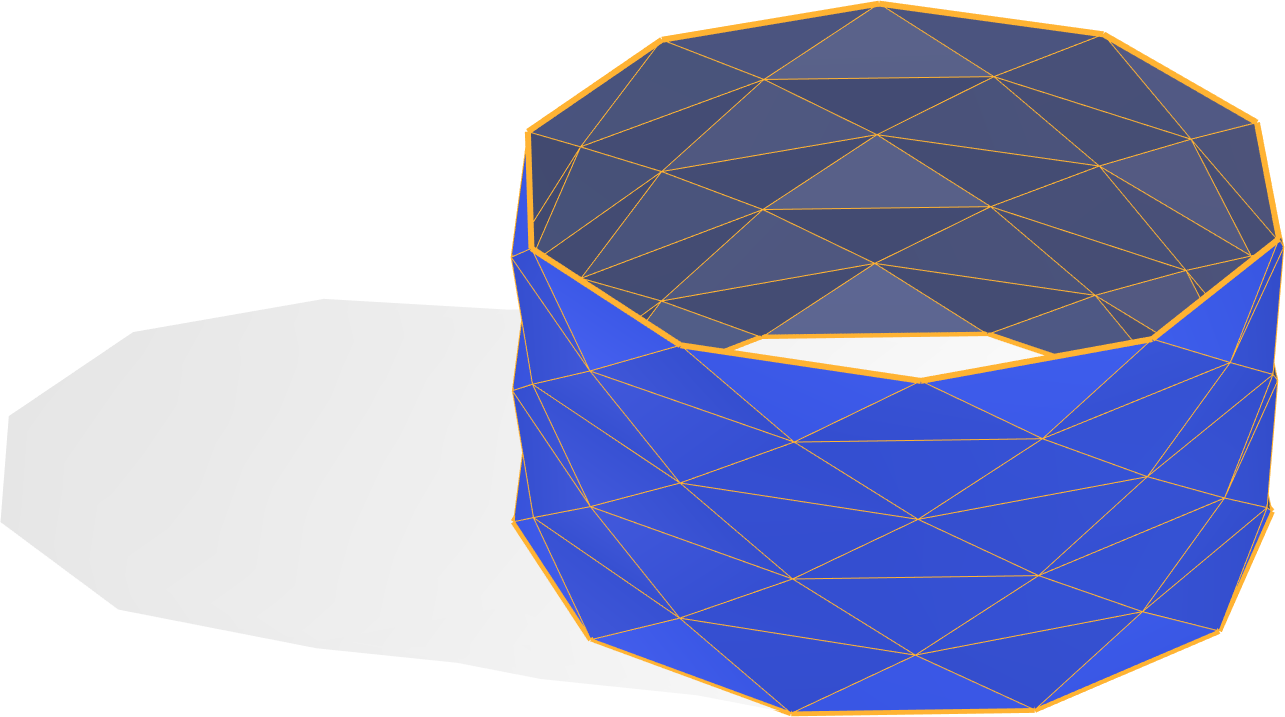
The Schwarz lantern

The sleeves of Mona Lisa are wrinkled in the Yoshimura buckling pattern

Yoshimura buckling, named after Japanese researcher Yoshimaru Yoshimura (Japanese: 吉村慶丸), is a triangular mesh buckling pattern found in thin-walled cylinders under compression along the axis of the cylinder that produces corrugated shape resembling the Schwarz lantern. This is the same pattern found on the sleeves of Mona Lisa. Due to its axial stiffness and origami-like ability, it is being researched in applications such as aerospace, civil engineering, and robotics in addressing problems relating to compactness and rapid deployment. However, broader use is currently limited by the absence of a general mathematical framework.

== History ==
In 1941, crease patterns in cylindrical shells were first studied by Theodore von Kármán and Hsue-Shen Tsien at the California Institute of Technology, and was later independently studied by Yoshimaru Yoshimura in a 1951 Japanese paper, with an English version published in 1955. Isolation of Japan during and after World War II made Yoshimura unaware of the earlier work.

== Mathematical derivation ==
=== Compatibility condition ===
The compatibility condition of the buckling pattern is given by:

$\frac{1}{2} \left(2 \frac{\partial^2 F}{\partial x \partial \theta} - \frac{\partial^2 E}{\partial \theta^2} - \frac{\partial^2 G}{\partial x^2} \right) = LN - M^2 = KH$

$H^2 = EG - F^2$

where $E, F, G$ and $L, M, N$ represent the first and second fundamental forms of the deflection surface, respectively. $K$ represents the Gaussian curvature, which is expressed as:

$K = \frac{1}{R_1 R_2}$

where $R_1$ and $R_2$ are the principal radii of curvature of the cylinder. $H$ is expressed as:

$H = 2\left ( k^4+1\right )$

where $k$ is the length of the buckle in the circumferential direction divided by the length of the buckle in the axial direction.

- On the undeformed initial surface, the Gaussian curvature of the cylinder is 0, satisfying the compatibility condition.
- On the deformed surface, it is observed that the surface is nearly developable. Consequently, the Gaussian curvature of the cylinder is close to 0. Since the left side of the first compatibility condition is already small, the compatibility condition is satisfied.

=== Buckling load prediction ===
In classical shell theory, the asymptotic formula to predict the critical buckling load $\sigma_{cr}$ in cylindrical shells is expressed as:

$\sigma_{cr} = \frac{ Eh }{\sqrt { ( 3 - \nu^2 ) } }$

where $h = \frac{t}{R}$ represents the ratio of the cylinder wall thickness to the radius, and $E$ and $\nu$ represent the Young's modulus and Poisson ratio, respectively. This classical formula is occasionally referred to as Koiter's formula after Dutch engineer Warner T. Koiter, who derived it in 1945, but was first derived by R. Lorenz in 1911.

Experimental results have shown that this classical formula frequently overestimates the buckling load by a factor of 4 to 5. This discrepancy is often attributed to the buckling load's high sensitivity to imperfections in the structure's shape and load.

=== Conditions for equilibrium ===
Under a Cartesian coordinate system, the equilibrium conditions for a cylinder under axial compression can be expressed as:

$D \nabla^4 \omega = 2h \left[\frac{\partial^2 \phi}{\partial y^2} \frac{\partial^2 \omega}{\partial x^2}-2\frac{\partial^2 \phi}{\partial x^2 \partial y^2} \frac{\partial^2 \omega}{\partial x \partial y}+\frac{\partial^2 \phi}{\partial x^2}\left( \frac{\partial^2 \omega}{\partial y^2}+\frac{1}{r}\right) \right]$

$\nabla^4 \phi = E \left[\left(\frac{\partial^2 \omega}{\partial y^2}\right)^2-\frac{\partial^2 \omega}{\partial x^2} \frac{\partial^2 \omega}{\partial^2 y^2} \right]-\frac{E}{r} \frac{\partial^2 \omega}{\partial x^2}$

where $E$ and $D$ are the Young's modulus and flexural rigidity, respectively. $\phi$ is derived from the second equation, and $\omega$ can be expressed as:

$\omega = A \cos \lambda (y+mx) \cos \lambda (y-mx) + B [ \cos \lambda (y+mx)+ \cos \lambda (y-mx) ]+C$

with $\lambda, m, A, B, C$ as the parameters. This carefully selected method allows for the following methods of simplication:

- $\omega = 2B \cos \lambda m x \cos \lambda y$ — when $A = C = 0$. Represents axial and circumferential waves.
- $\omega = 4B \cos^2 \frac{\lambda}{2} (y+mx) \cos^2 \frac{\lambda}{2} (y-mx) + \text{constant}$ when $A = B$. Represents a variation of diamond shaped buckles.

The solutions for the equations may be found with these equations, with varying methods of solution. Two significant methods of solution come from Kármán and Hsue-Shen in 1941, and D. M. A Leggett in 1953.

== Characteristics ==
=== Folding pattern ===
Schwarz lantern crease pattern

The Yoshimura folding pattern is composed of isosceles triangles that share a single edge at the base, forming repeated rhombuses, as seen in the Schwarz lantern crease pattern. Slightly different buckling patterns can occur based on manipulating the angles and dimensions of the individual triangles. The crease pattern for folding the Schwarz lantern from a flat piece of paper, a tessellation of the plane by isosceles triangles, has also been called the Yoshimura pattern based on the same work by Yoshimura. The Yoshimura creasing pattern is related to both the Kresling and Hexagonal folds, and can be framed as a special case of the Miura fold. Unlike the Miura fold which is rigidly deformable, both the Yoshimura and Kresling patterns require panel deformation to be folded to a compact state.

=== Local buckling ===
Cylindrical shells under axial compression have been observed to exhibit local buckling, provided that they are comparatively long. Local buckling is a phenomenon where a structure undergoes local deformation, as opposed to Euler (global) buckling, which is a deformation of the whole structure. Consequently, lengthwise along the cylinder, the buckling occurs at over 1.5 times the lobe's axial wavelength. Circumference-wise, both the cylinder and loading equipment must have complete rotational symmetry to affect the cylinder's entire circumference.

This phenomenon can be further explained as a loss of total elastic energy. Considering a cylinder with fixed ends under Euler's critical load, the elastic energy decrease of the unbuckled region will overpower the increase in elastic energy of the buckled region when local buckling occurs. This results in a loss of total elastic energy.

=== High imperfection sensitivity ===
The critical buckling load of cylindrical shells under axial compression is highly sensitive to imperfections in the shape and load. With respect to the asymptotic formula $\sigma_{cr} = \frac{Eh}{\sqrt{( 3- \nu ^2 )}}$from classical shell theory, where $h = \frac{t}{R}$ is the shell's dimensionless thickness, the buckling load approximately scales in two different ways:

- $\sigma_{cr} \sim h^{3/2}$ for imperfections in shape.
- $\sigma_{cr} \sim h^{5/4}$ for imperfections in load.

=== Developable surface ===
As the thickness of the cylindrical shell decreases, the buckled surface becomes approximately developable. The surface is consequently most developable when the thickness of the shell approaches 0, as it behaves like an ideal membrane.

== Applications ==
Yoshimura buckling and its related origami patterns' possible applications have been researched, but their use in engineering remains limited. Current Yoshimura origami designs lack an overarching mathematical theory between the two dimensional (2-D) creases, and three-dimensional (3-D) forms. The absence of a unified theory makes it difficult for a general design method to be formulated, and current designs are extremely specific to its application.

Additional research for its potential uses in engineering is still in development; researchers are attempting to develop an intuitive parametric method and general numerical theorem to tweak existing Yoshimura designs for engineering efficiency. Currently, engineering attempts to develop a deployable cylindrical structure with Yoshimura folding have only been made for membrane structures, such as soft pneumatic actuators.

=== Aerospace ===
The application of origami-based design, like the Yoshimura pattern, allows for aerospace engineering applications with reduced weight and volumes while also increasing portability and deployability. For example, a cylinder in a Yoshimura folding pattern has a high stiffness in the axial direction, allowing for structural rigidity. Origami flashers self-deploy under the centrifugal force of orbit without requiring additional structural support. While some other origami patterns have already been utilized and validated (the IKAROS spacecraft), the Yoshimura pattern is being researched in applications like inflatable space habitats that require a portable and structurally rigid solution.

=== Civil engineering ===
The Yoshimura buckling pattern allows for uniform thickness of material. Uniform thickness is important in origami used in construction applications, as uniform thickness can transfer compression and tension forces more evenly, allowing for stiffer structures and higher load capacity. Research shows that origami with non-uniform thickness has much lower load-carrying performance when subject to axial compression forces. Similar to aerospace applications, applications in civil engineering and construction can potentially use Yoshimura patterns when portable and quickly deployable structures are required. For example, emergency shelters in disaster relief infrastructure or rapidly deployable bridges. A large setback is due to the Yoshimura pattern's significant amount of material deformation, which can make it difficult to build with brittle materials such as metals or other composites with high strength typically used in construction. Instead, researchers are studying using Yoshimura buckling inspired construction using hinges at the creases instead of deformation of the material itself.

=== Robotics ===
Rotary origami structures provide protection for rigid robotic structures by reducing the peak impact force they experience. This approach shows potential for applications in antenna design and space engineering. Current applications of the Yoshimura buckling have focused on structures built with soft membranes, such as the casing around pneumatic actuators or protective housing of robotic joints. Yoshimura pattern's compliability also makes it applicable in reconfigurable soft robots (RSRs) made from synthesized materials due to its 1800% elongation ratio under paper fabrication.

== See also ==
- Euler's critical load, a formula that predicts the critical buckling load of a column.
- Miura fold, a generalization of the Yoshimura fold.
