= Schwarz lantern =

Near-cylindrical polyhedron with large area

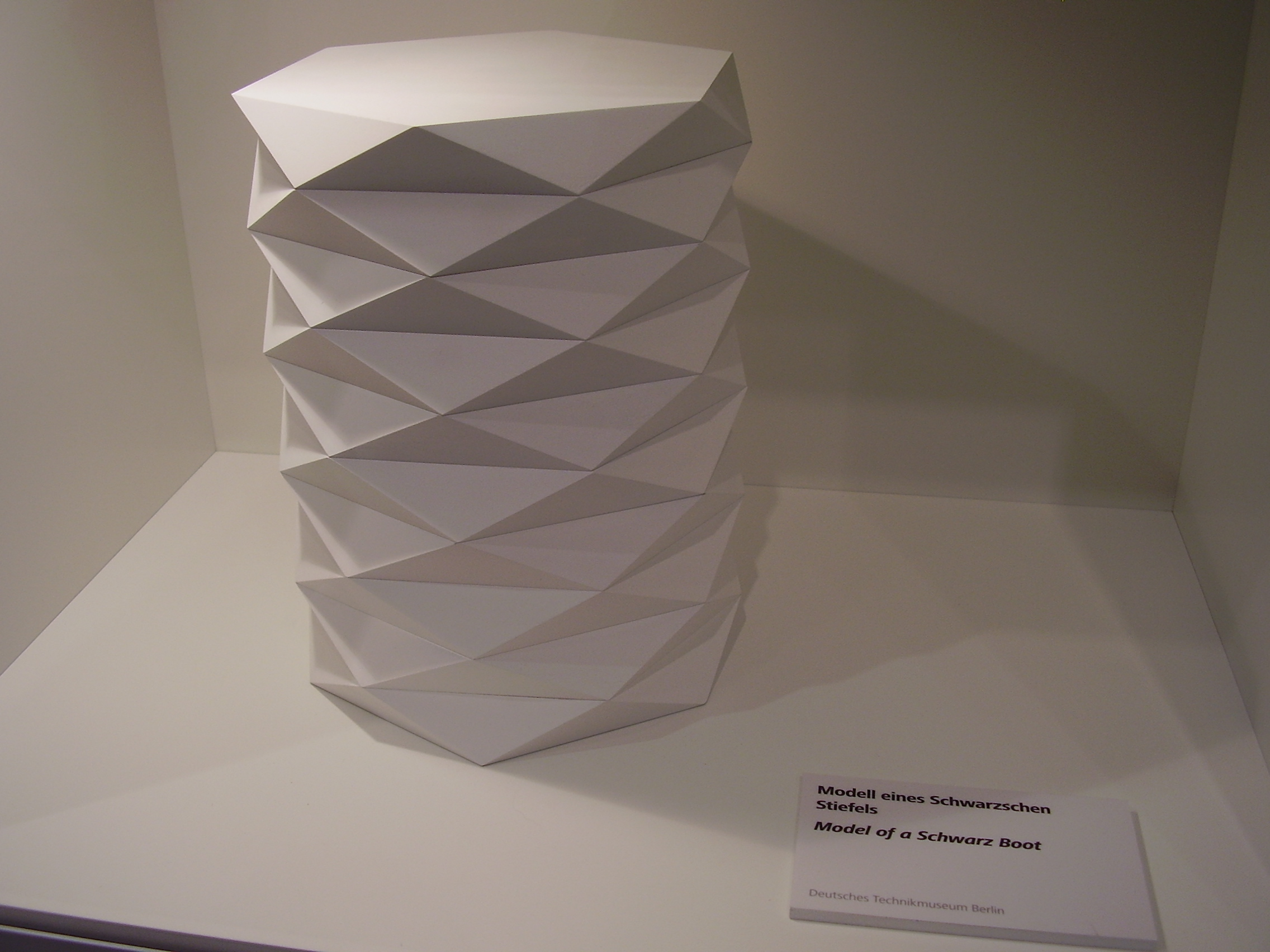
Schwarz lantern on display in the German Museum of Technology, Berlin

In mathematics, the Schwarz lantern is a polyhedral approximation to a cylinder, used as a pathological example of the difficulty of defining the area of a smooth (curved) surface as the limit of the areas of polyhedra. It is formed by stacked rings of isosceles triangles, arranged within each ring in the same pattern as an antiprism. The resulting shape can be folded from paper, and is named after mathematician Hermann Schwarz and for its resemblance to a cylindrical paper lantern. It is also known as Schwarz's boot, Schwarz's polyhedron, or the Chinese lantern.

As Schwarz showed, for the surface area of a polyhedron to converge to the surface area of a curved surface, it is not sufficient to simply increase the number of rings and the number of isosceles triangles per ring. Depending on the relation of the number of rings to the number of triangles per ring, the area of the lantern can converge to the area of the cylinder, to a limit arbitrarily larger than the area of the cylinder, or to infinity—in other words, the area can diverge. The Schwarz lantern demonstrates that sampling a curved surface by close-together points and connecting them by small triangles is inadequate to ensure an accurate approximation of area, in contrast to the accurate approximation of arc length by inscribed polygonal chains.

The phenomenon that closely sampled points can lead to inaccurate approximations of area has been called the Schwarz paradox. The Schwarz lantern is an instructive example in calculus and highlights the need for care when choosing a triangulation for applications in computer graphics and the finite element method.

== History and motivation ==
The staircase paradox: polygonal chains of length $2$ converge in distance to a diagonal segment of length $\sqrt 2$, without converging to the same length.

Archimedes approximated the circumference of circles by the lengths of inscribed or circumscribed regular polygons. More generally, the length of any smooth or rectifiable curve can be defined as the supremum of the lengths of polygonal chains inscribed in them. However, for this to work correctly, the vertices of the polygonal chains must lie on the given curve, rather than merely near it. Otherwise, in a counterexample sometimes known as the staircase paradox, polygonal chains of vertical and horizontal line segments of total length $2$ can lie arbitrarily close to a diagonal line segment of length $\sqrt 2$, converging in distance to the diagonal segment but not converging to the same length. The Schwarz lantern provides a counterexample for surface area rather than length, and shows that for area, requiring vertices to lie on the approximated surface is not enough to ensure an accurate approximation.

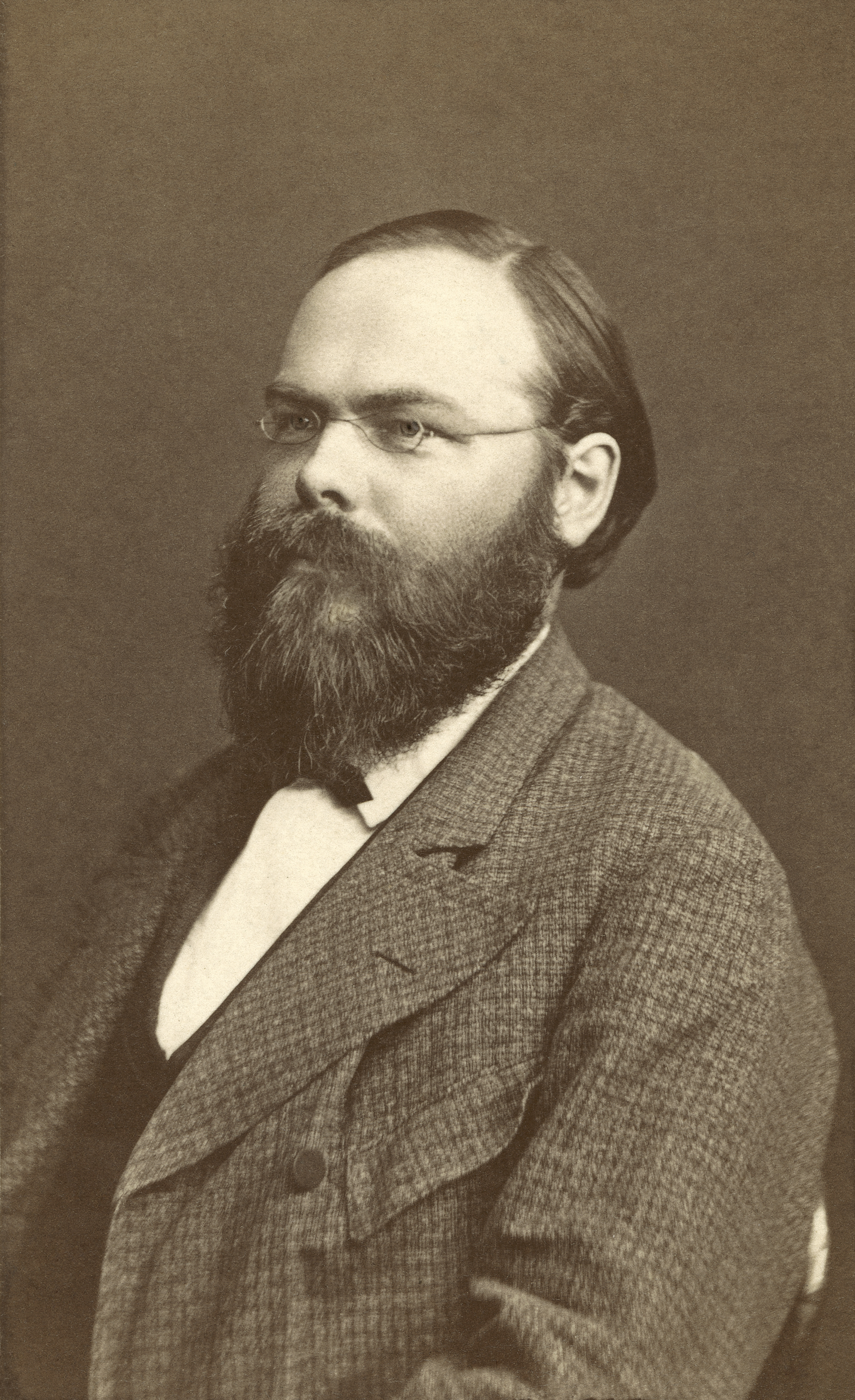
Hermann Schwarz

German mathematician Hermann Schwarz (1843–1921) devised his construction in the late 19th century (Note: Gandon & Perrin (2009) place the timing more precisely as the early 1890s, but this is contradicted by Hermite's use of this example in 1883. Kennedy (1980) dates Schwarz's communication to Genocchi on this topic to 1880, and Peano's rediscovery to 1882.) as a counterexample to the erroneous definition in J. A. Serret's 1868 book Cours de calcul differentiel et integral, which incorrectly states that:

Soit une portion de surface courbe terminée par un contour $C$; nous nommerons aire de cette surface la limite $S$ vers laquelle tend l'aire d'une surface polyédrale inscrite formée de faces triangulaires et terminee par un contour polygonal $\Gamma$ ayant pour limite le contour $C$.

Il faut démontrer que la limite $S$ existe et qu'elle est indépendante de la loi suivant laquelle décroissent les faces de la surface polyedrale inscrite.

Let a portion of curved surface be bounded by a contour $C$; we will define the area of this surface to be the limit $S$ tended towards by the area of an inscribed polyhedral surface formed from triangular faces and bounded by a polygonal contour $\Gamma$ whose limit is the contour $C$.

It must be shown that the limit $S$ exists and that it is independent of the law according to which the faces of the inscribed polyhedral surface shrink.

Independently of Schwarz, Giuseppe Peano found the same counterexample. At the time, Peano was a student of Angelo Genocchi, who, from communication with Schwarz, already knew about the difficulty of defining surface area. Genocchi informed Charles Hermite, who had been using Serret's erroneous definition in his course. Hermite asked Schwarz for details, revised his course, and published the example in the second edition of his lecture notes (1883). The original note from Schwarz to Hermite was not published until the second edition of Schwarz's collected works in 1890.

An instructive example of the value of careful definitions in calculus, the Schwarz lantern also highlights the need for care in choosing a triangulation for applications in computer graphics and for the finite element method for scientific and engineering simulations. In computer graphics, scenes are often described by triangulated surfaces, and accurate rendering of the illumination of those surfaces depends on the direction of the surface normals. A poor choice of triangulation, as in the Schwarz lantern, can produce an accordion-like surface whose normals are far from the normals of the approximated surface, and the closely-spaced sharp folds of this surface can also cause problems with aliasing.

The failure of Schwarz lanterns to converge to the cylinder's area only happens when they include highly obtuse triangles, with angles close to 180°. In restricted classes of Schwarz lanterns using angles bounded away from 180°, the area converges to the same area as the cylinder as the number of triangles grows to infinity. The finite element method, in its most basic form, approximates a smooth function (often, the solution to a physical simulation problem in science or engineering) by a piecewise-linear function on a triangulation. The Schwarz lantern's example shows that, even for simple functions such as the height of a cylinder above a plane through its axis, and even when the function values are calculated accurately at the triangulation vertices, a triangulation with angles close to 180° can produce highly inaccurate simulation results. This motivates mesh generation methods for which all angles are bounded away from 180°, such as nonobtuse meshes.

== Construction ==
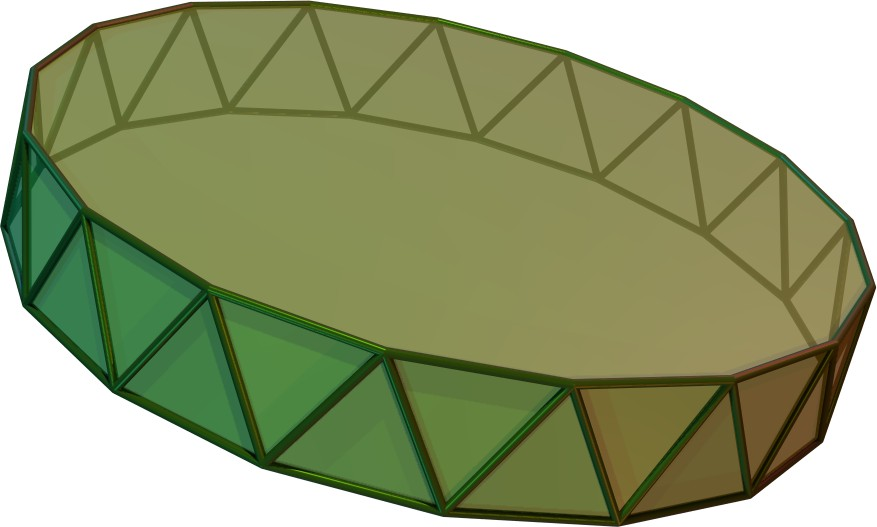
Antiprism based on a regular 17-gon. Omitting the two 17-gon faces produces a Schwarz lantern with parameters $m=1$ and $n=17$. Other Schwarz lanterns with $n=17$ can be obtained by stacking $m$ copies of this antiprism.

The discrete polyhedral approximation considered by Schwarz can be described by two parameters: $m$, the number of rings of triangles in the Schwarz lantern; and $n$, half of the number of triangles per ring. (Note: Other sources may use different parameterizations; for instance, Dubrovsky (1991) uses $k$ instead of $m$ to denote the number of cylinders.) For a single ring ($m=1$), the resulting surface consists of the triangular faces of an antiprism of order $n$. For larger values of $m$, the Schwarz lantern is formed by stacking $m$ of these antiprisms. To construct a Schwarz lantern that approximates a given right circular cylinder, the cylinder is sliced by parallel planes into $m$ congruent cylindrical rings. These rings have $m+1$ circular boundaries—two at the ends of the given cylinder, and $m-1$ more where it was sliced. In each circle, $n$ vertices of the Schwarz lantern are spaced equally, forming a regular polygon. These polygons are rotated by an angle of $\pi/n$ from one circle to the next, so that each edge from a regular polygon and the nearest vertex on the next circle form the base and apex of an isosceles triangle. These triangles meet edge-to-edge to form the Schwarz lantern, a polyhedral surface that is topologically equivalent to the cylinder.

Origami crease pattern for a Schwarz lantern with $m=16$ and $n=4$

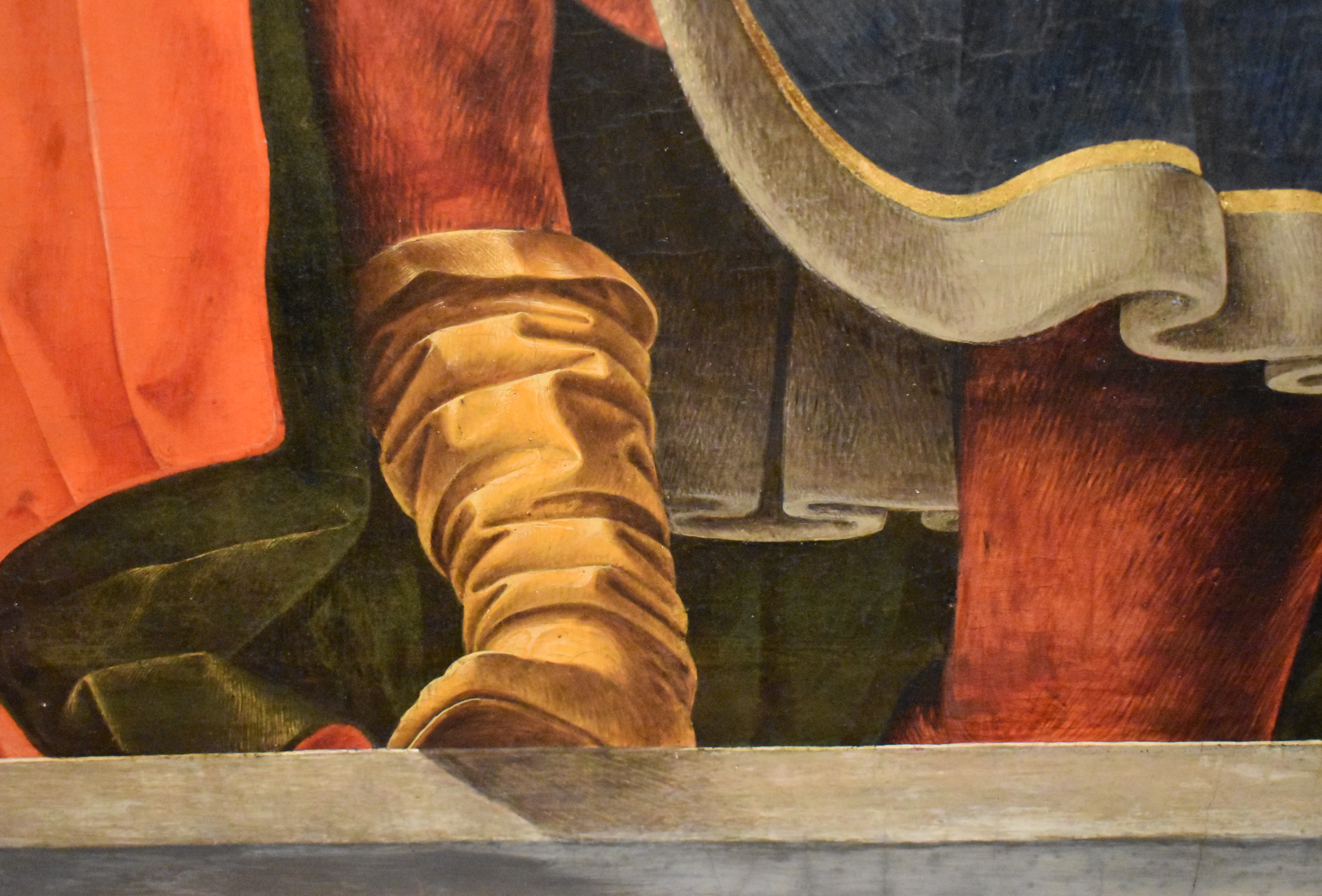
Detail of a boot from the painting Saint Florian (1473) by Francesco del Cossa, showing Yoshimura buckling

Ignoring top and bottom vertices, each vertex touches two apex angles and four base angles of congruent isosceles triangles, just as it would in a tessellation of the plane by triangles of the same shape. As a consequence, the Schwarz lantern can be folded from a flat piece of paper, with this tessellation as its crease pattern. This crease pattern has been called the Yoshimura pattern, after the work of Y. Yoshimura on the Yoshimura buckling pattern of cylindrical surfaces under axial compression, which can be similar in shape to the Schwarz lantern.

== Area ==
The area of the Schwarz lantern, for any cylinder and any particular choice of the parameters $m$ and $n$, can be calculated by a straightforward application of trigonometry. A cylinder of radius $r$ and length $\ell$ has area $2\pi r\ell$. For a Schwarz lantern with parameters $m$ and $n$, each band is a shorter cylinder of length $\ell/m$, approximated by $2n$ isosceles triangles. The length of the base of each triangle can be found from the formula for the edge length of a regular $n$-gon, namely
$$2r\sin\frac{\pi}{n}.$$
The height $h$ of each triangle can be found by applying the Pythagorean theorem to a right triangle formed by the apex of the triangle, the midpoint of the base, and the midpoint of the arc of the circle bounded by the endpoints of the base. The two sides of this right triangle are the length $\ell/m$ of the cylindrical band, and the sagitta of the arc, (Note: The sagitta of a circular arc is the distance from the midpoint of the arc to the midpoint of its chord.) giving the formula
$$h^2 = \left(\frac{\ell}{m}\right)^2+\left(r\left(1-\cos\frac{\pi}{n}\right)\right)^2.$$
Combining the formula for the area of each triangle from its base and height, and the total number $2mn$ of the triangles, gives the Schwarz lantern a total area of
$$A(m,n)=2mn\left(r\sin\frac{\pi}{n}\right)
\sqrt{\left(\frac{\ell}{m}\right)^2+r^2\left(1-\cos\frac{\pi}{n}\right)^2}.$$

== Limits ==
Animation of Schwarz-lantern convergence (or lack thereof) for various relations between its two parameters

The Schwarz lanterns, for large values of both parameters, converge uniformly to the cylinder that they approximate. However, because there are two free parameters $m$ and $n$, the limiting area of the Schwarz lantern, as both $m$ and $n$ become arbitrarily large, can be evaluated in different orders, with different results. If $m$ is fixed while $n$ grows, and the resulting limit is then evaluated for arbitrarily large choices of $m$, one obtains
$$\lim_{m\to\infty} \lim_{n\to\infty} A(m,n)=2\pi r\ell,$$
the correct area for the cylinder. In this case, the inner limit already converges to the same value, and the outer limit is superfluous. Geometrically, substituting each cylindrical band by a band of very sharp isosceles triangles accurately approximates its area.

On the other hand, reversing the ordering of the limits gives
$$\lim_{n\to\infty} \lim_{m\to\infty} A(m,n)=\infty.$$
In this case, for a fixed choice of $n$, as $m$ grows and the length $\ell/m$ of each cylindrical band becomes arbitrarily small, each corresponding band of isosceles triangles becomes nearly planar. Each triangle approaches the triangle formed by two consecutive edges of a regular $2n$-gon, and the area of the whole band of triangles approaches $2n$ times the area of one of these planar triangles, a finite number. However, the number $m$ of these bands grows arbitrarily large; because the lantern's area grows in approximate proportion to $m$, it also becomes arbitrarily large.

It is also possible to fix a functional relation between $m$ and $n$, and to examine the limit as both parameters grow large simultaneously, maintaining this relation. Different choices of this relation can lead to either of the two behaviors described above, convergence to the correct area or divergence to infinity. For instance, setting $m=cn$ (for an arbitrary constant $c$) and taking the limit for large $n$ leads to convergence to the correct area, while setting $m=cn^3$ leads to divergence. A third type of limiting behavior is obtained by setting $m=cn^2$. For this choice,
$$\lim_{n\to\infty} A(cn^2,n)=
2\pi r\sqrt{\ell^2+\frac{r^2\pi^4c^2}{4}}.$$
In this case, the area of the Schwarz lantern, parameterized in this way, converges, but to a larger value than the area of the cylinder. Any desired larger area can be obtained by making an appropriate choice of the constant $c$.

== See also ==
- Kaleidocycle, a chain of tetrahedra linked edge-to-edge like a degenerate Schwarz lantern with $n=2$
- Runge's phenomenon, another example of failure of convergence
