= Miura fold =

Origami folding pattern

Crease pattern for a Miura fold. The parallelograms of this example have 84° and 96° angles.

Animation of the folding and unfolding of a Miura-creased material

The Miura fold (ミウラ折り, Miura-ori) is a method of folding a flat surface such as a sheet of paper into a smaller area. The fold is named for its inventor, Japanese astrophysicist Kōryō Miura.

The crease patterns of the Miura fold form a tessellation of the surface by parallelograms. In one direction, the creases lie along straight lines, with each parallelogram forming the mirror reflection of its neighbor across each crease. In the other direction, the creases zigzag, and each parallelogram is the translation of its neighbor across the crease. Each of the zigzag paths of creases consists solely of mountain folds or of valley folds, with mountains alternating with valleys from one zigzag path to the next. Each of the straight paths of creases alternates between mountain and valley folds. The Miura fold is related to the Kresling fold, the Yoshimura fold and the Hexagonal fold, and can be framed as a generalization of these folds.

The Miura fold is a form of rigid origami, meaning that the fold can be carried out by a continuous motion in which, at each step, each parallelogram is completely flat. This property allows it to be used to fold surfaces made of rigid materials, making it distinct from the Kresling fold and Yoshimura fold which cannot be rigidly folded and require panel deformations to compress to a compact state. For instance, large solar panel arrays for space satellites in the Japanese space program have been Miura folded before launch and then spread out in space. A folded Miura fold can be packed into a compact shape, its thickness reflecting only the thickness of the folded material. Folded material can be unpacked in one motion by pulling on its opposite ends, and likewise folded by pushing the two ends together. In the solar array application, this property reduces the number of motors required to unfold this shape, reducing weight and complexity.

== Applications ==
The 1996 Space Flyer Unit deployed the 2D Array from a Miura folded configuration.

The inflatable membrane structure of the SPROUT satellite is carried into space in the Miura-folded state, and then deployed using inflatable tubes themselves carried into space in the Octagon-folded state.

Other potential applications of this fold include surgical devices such as stents and flat-foldable furniture.

Researchers at the University of Fribourg used the Miura fold to stack hydrogel films, generating electricity similarly to electric eels. The Miura fold is used to cause many parts of the stack to contact each other simultaneously.
