= Backcoating =

Paper preparation technique for origami

Backcoating is the lamination of two sheets of paper back to back to create a superior paper for folding origami models.
