= Maekawa's theorem =

Result about flat-foldable origami crease patterns

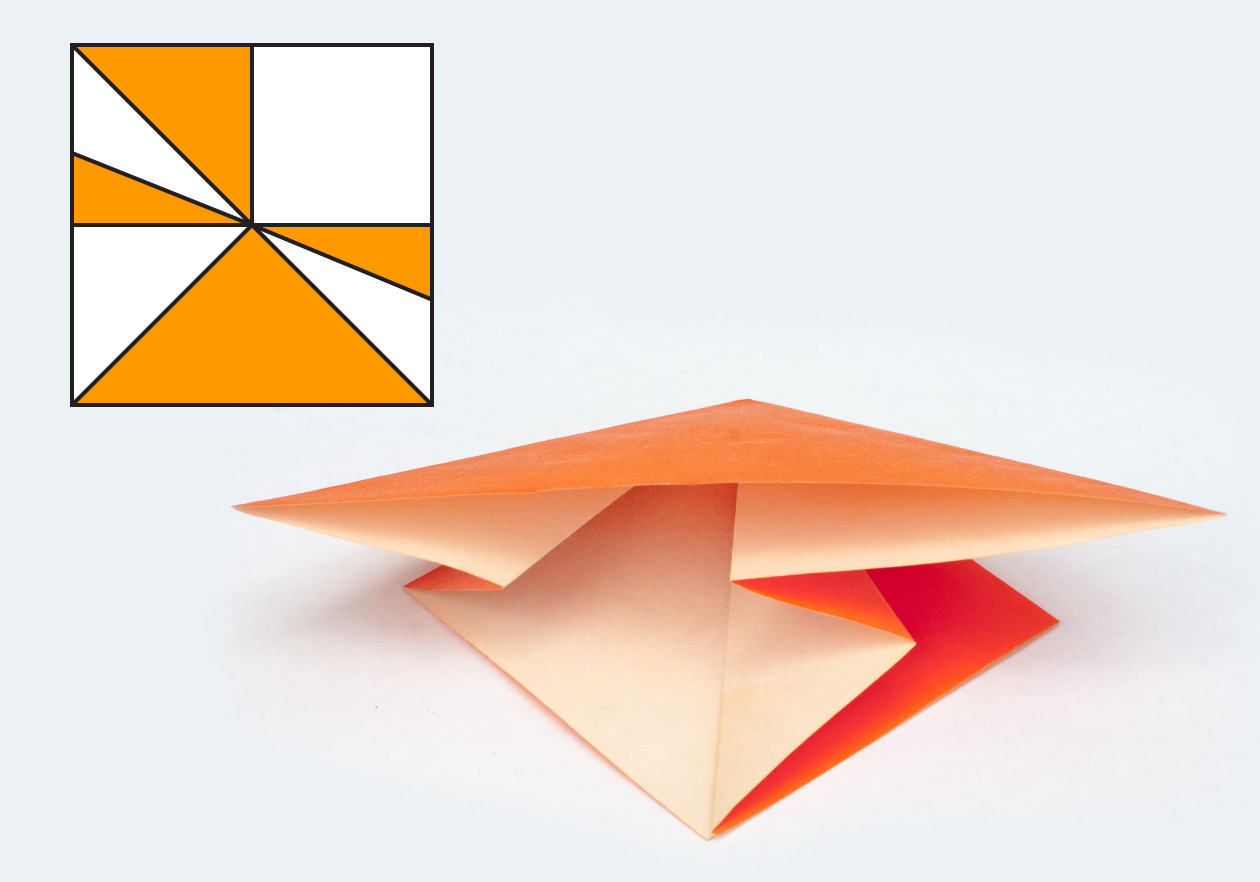
In this one-vertex crease pattern, the number of mountain folds (the five folds with the colored side out) differs by two from the number of valley folds (the three folds with the white side out)

Maekawa's theorem is a theorem in the mathematics of paper folding named after Jun Maekawa. It relates to flat-foldable origami crease patterns and states that at every vertex, the numbers of valley and mountain folds always differ by two in either direction. The same result was also discovered by Jacques Justin and, even earlier, by S. Murata.

== Parity and coloring ==
One consequence of Maekawa's theorem is that the total number of folds at each vertex must be an even number. This implies (via a form of planar graph duality between Eulerian graphs and bipartite graphs) that, for any flat-foldable crease pattern, it is always possible to color the regions between the creases with two colors, such that each crease separates regions of differing colors. The same result can also be seen by considering which side of the sheet of paper is uppermost in each region of the folded shape.

== Related results ==
Maekawa's theorem does not completely characterize the flat-foldable vertices, because accounts only for the numbers of folds of each type, not their angles. Kawasaki's theorem gives a complementary condition on the angles between the folds at a vertex (regardless of which folds are mountain folds and which are valley folds) that is also necessary for a vertex to be flat-foldable.
