= Origami =

Japanese art of paper folding

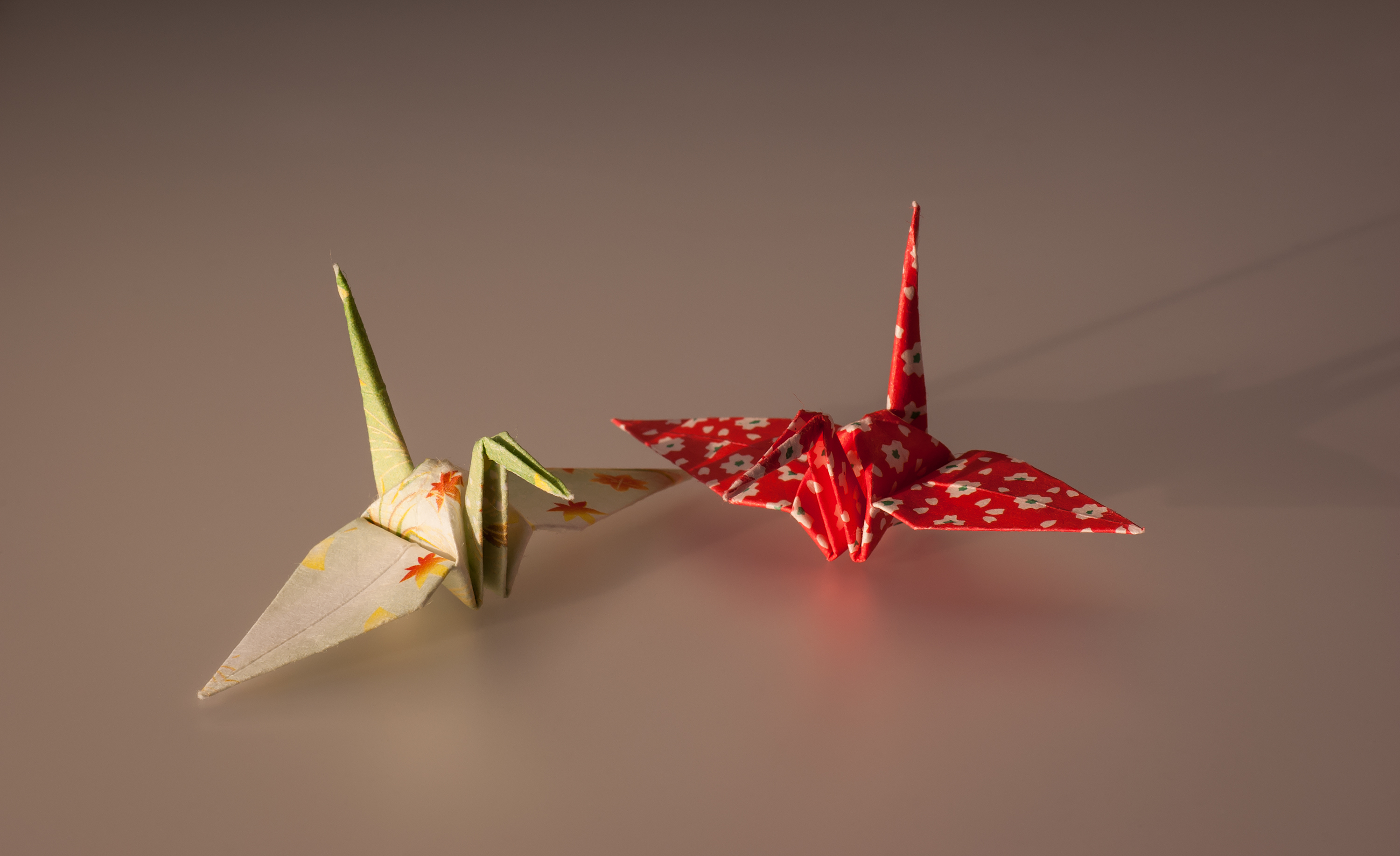
Origami cranes

The folding of an Origami crane

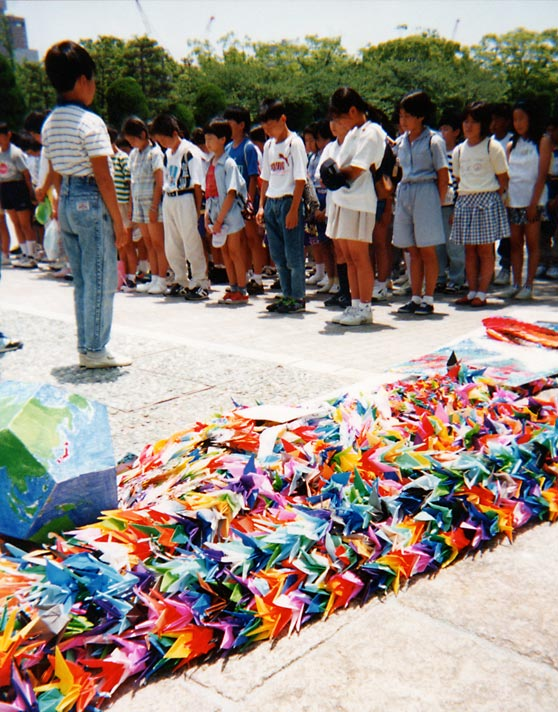
A group of Japanese schoolchildren dedicate their contribution of senbazuru at the Sadako Sasaki memorial in Hiroshima.

Origami (折り紙) (Note: Japanese pronunciation: [oɾiɡami] or [oɾiꜜɡami], from ori meaning 'folding', and kami meaning 'paper' (kami changes to gami due to rendaku)) is the art and technique of folding paper. It also refers to the two- and three-dimensional forms created in the process. The use of the term has been extended in modern times to include other materials such as metal, textiles, and it is also used in the biological sciences to describe folded structures like DNA.

Although the word origami has Japanese roots, the practice itself is universal and its origin remains unknown.

The goal is to transform a flat square sheet of paper into a finished sculpture through folding and sculpting techniques. Modern origami practitioners generally discourage the use of cuts, glue, or markings on the paper. Origami folders often use the Japanese word kirigami to refer to designs which use cuts.

In the detailed Japanese classification, origami is divided into stylized ceremonial origami (儀礼折り紙, girei origami) and recreational origami (遊戯折り紙, yūgi origami), and only recreational origami is generally recognized as origami. In Japan, ceremonial origami is generally called "origata" (ja:折形) to distinguish it from recreational origami. The term "origata" is one of the old terms for origami.

The small number of basic origami folds can be combined in a variety of ways to make intricate designs. The best-known origami model is the Japanese paper crane. In general, these designs begin with a square sheet of paper whose sides may be of different colors, prints, or patterns. Traditional Japanese origami, which has been practiced since the Edo period (1603–1868), has often been less strict about these conventions, sometimes cutting the paper or using nonsquare shapes to start with. The principles of origami are also used in stents, packaging, and other engineering applications.

== Etymology ==
The word "origami" is a compound of two smaller words: "ori" (root verb "oru"), meaning to fold, and "kami", meaning paper. Until recently, not all forms of paper folding were grouped under the word origami. Before that, paper folding for play was known by a variety of names, including "orikata" or "origata" (折形), "orisue" (折据), "orimono" (折物), "tatamigami" (畳紙) and others.

The term has been adopted in many countries, while in others, local vocabulary is preferred for recreational paper folding, such as zhe zhi in China, jongi jeobgi in Korea and papiroflexia in Spain.

== History ==
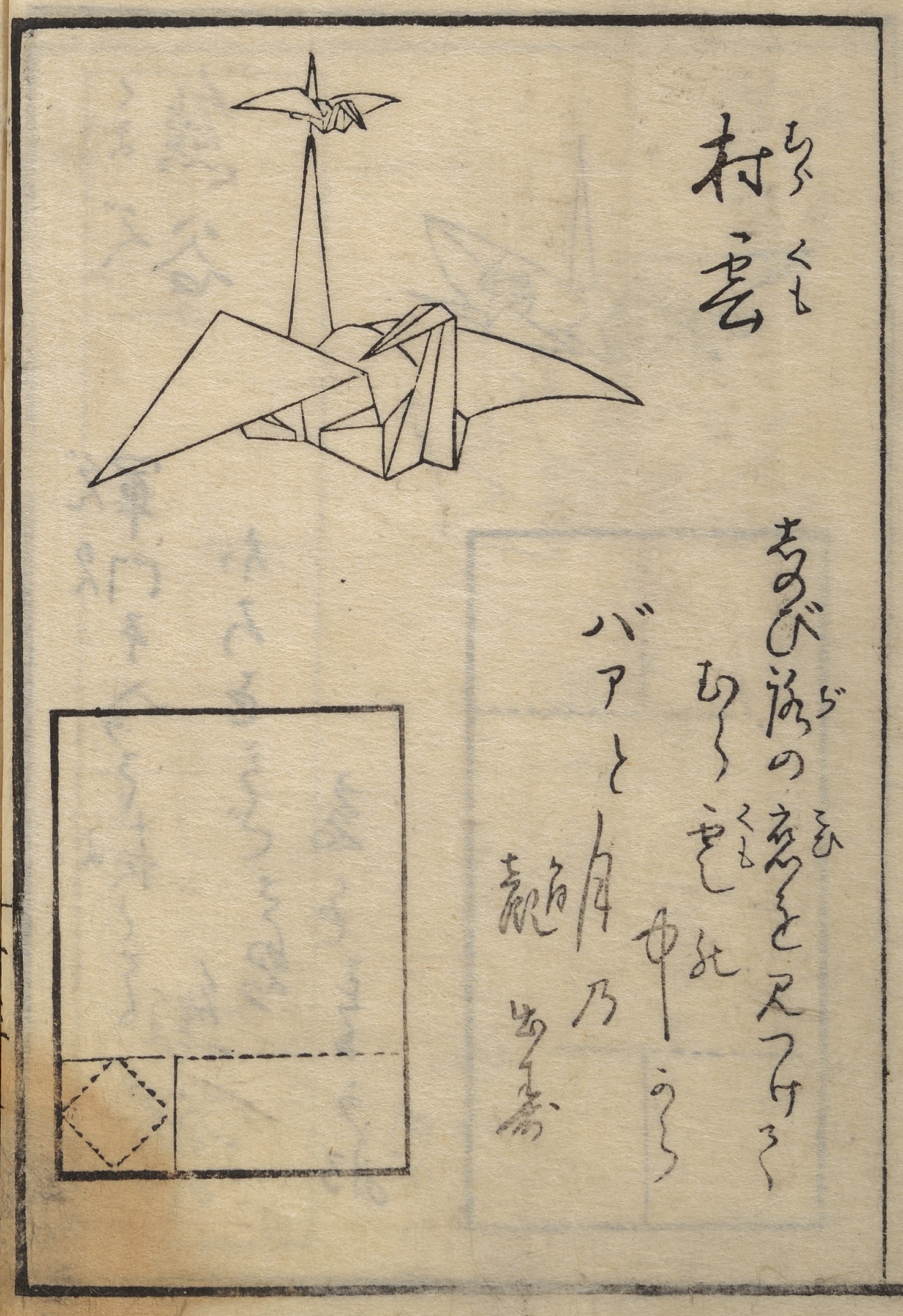
The folding of two origami cranes linked together, from the first known technical book on origami, Hiden senbazuru orikata, published in Japan in 1797

Distinct paperfolding traditions arose in Europe, China, and Japan which have been well-documented by historians. These seem to have been mostly separate traditions, until the 20th century.

=== Ceremonial origami (origata) ===
By the 7th century, paper had been introduced to Japan from China via the Korean Peninsula, and the Japanese developed washi by improving the method of making paper in the Heian period. The paper making technique developed in Japan around 805 to 809 was called nagashi-suki (流し漉き), a method of adding mucilage to the process of the conventional tame-suki (溜め漉き) technique to form a stronger layer of paper fibers. With the development of Japanese paper making technology and the widespread use of paper, folded paper began to be used for decorations and tools for religious ceremonies such as gohei, ōnusa (ja:大麻 (神道)) and shide at Shinto shrines. Religious decorations made of paper and the way gifts were wrapped in folded paper gradually became stylized and established as ceremonial origami. During the Heian period, the Imperial court established a code of etiquette for wrapping money and goods used in ceremonies with folded paper, and a code of etiquette for wrapping gifts.

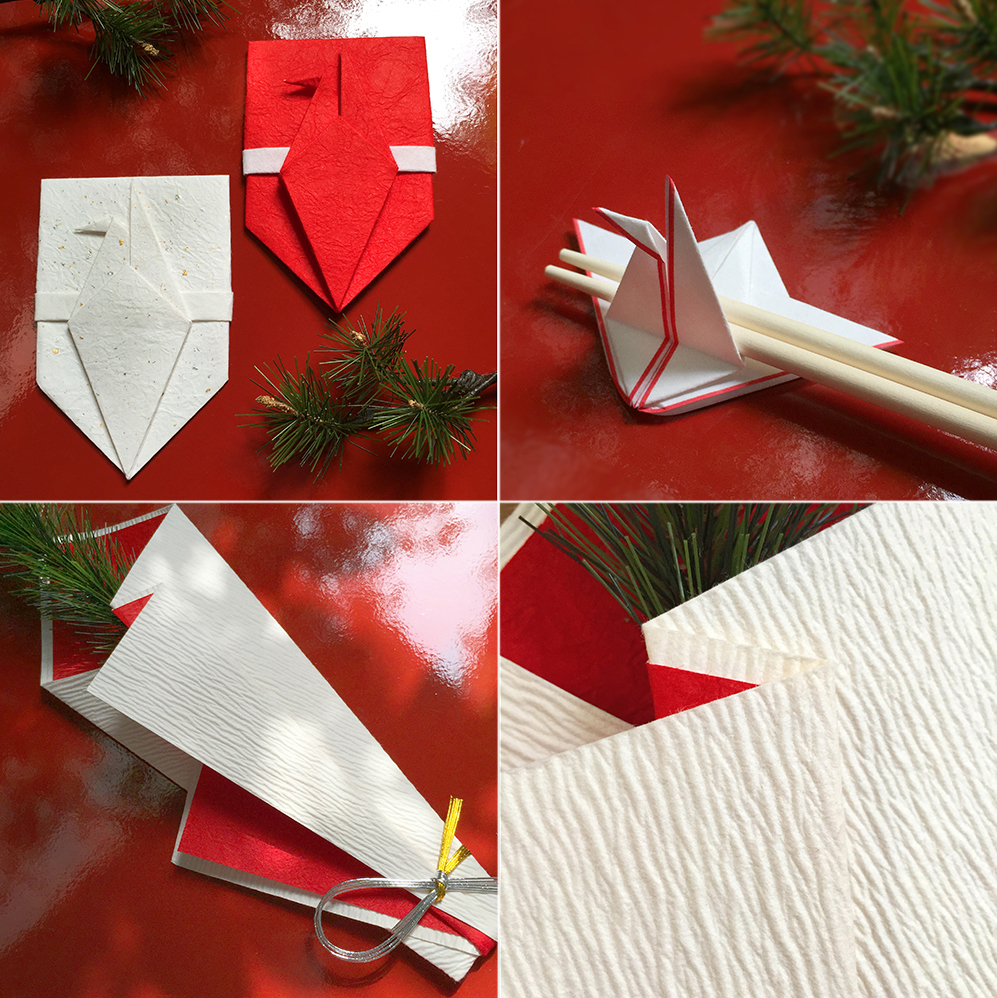
A modern ceremonial origami (origata) that follows the ceremonial origami of the upper samurai class of the Muromachi period

In the Muromachi period from the 1300s to the 1400s, various forms of decorum were developed by the Ogasawara clan and Ise clans (ja:伊勢氏), completing the prototype of Japanese folded-paper decorum that continues to this day. The Ise clan presided over the decorum of the inside of the palace of the Ashikaga Shogunate, and in particular, Ise Sadachika (ja:伊勢貞親) during the reign of the eighth Shogun, Ashikaga Yoshimasa (足利義政), greatly influenced the development of the decorum of the daimyo and samurai classes, leading to the development of various stylized forms of ceremonial origami. The shapes of ceremonial origami created in this period were geometric, and the shapes of noshi to be attached to gifts at feasts and weddings, and origami that imitated butterflies to be displayed on sake vessels, were quite different from those of later generations of recreational origami whose shapes captured the characteristics of real objects and living things. The "noshi" wrapping, and the folding of female and male butterflies, which are still used for weddings and celebrations, are a continuation and development of a tradition that began in the Muromachi period. A reference in a poem by Ihara Saikaku from 1680 describes the origami butterflies used during Shinto weddings to represent the bride and groom.

=== Recreational origami ===
==== 1500s－1800s ====
It is not certain when play-made paper models, now commonly known as origami, began in Japan. However, the kozuka of a Japanese sword made by Gotō Eijō (後藤栄乗) between the end of the 1500s and the beginning of the 1600s was decorated with a picture of a crane made of origami, and it is believed that origami for play existed by the Sengoku period or the early Edo period.

In 1747, during the Edo period, a book titled Ranma zushiki (欄間図式) was published, which contained various designs of the ranma (ja:欄間), a decoration of Japanese architecture. This included origami of various designs, including paper models of cranes, which are still well known today. It is thought that by this time, many people were familiar with origami for play, which modern people recognize as origami. During this period, origami was commonly called orikata (折形) or orisue (折据) and was often used as a pattern on kimonos and decorations.

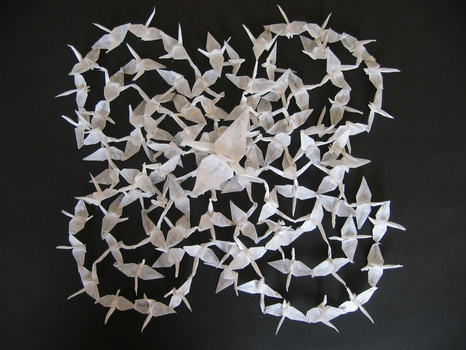
Hyakkaku (百鶴, One hundred cranes) is one of the works featured in Hiden senbazuru orikata. It is made by folding a single sheet of paper, and its production method has been designated an Intangible Cultural Property of Kuwana City.

Hiden senbazuru orikata (ja:秘傳千羽鶴折形), published in 1797, is the oldest known technical book on origami for play. The book contains 49 origami pieces created by a Buddhist monk named Gidō (:ja:義道) in Ise Province, whose works were named and accompanied by kyōka (狂歌, comic tanka) by author Akisato Ritō (秋里籬島). These pieces were far more technically advanced than their predecessors, suggesting that origami culture had become more sophisticated. Gido continued to produce origami after the publication of his book, leaving at least 158 highly skilled masterpieces for posterity. In 1976, Kuwana City in Mie Prefecture, Gido's hometown, designated 49 of the methods described in the Hiden senbazuru orikata as Intangible Cultural Properties of Kuwana City. Kuwana City has also certified qualified persons who are able to correctly produce these works and have in-depth knowledge of the art. Kuwana City has published some of the origami production methods on YouTube.

From the late Edo period to the Bakumatu period, origami that imitated the six legendary Japanese poets, rokkasen (六歌仙) listed in the Kokin Wakashū (古今和歌集) compiled in the 900s and the characters in Chūshingura became popular, but today they are rarely used as subjects for origami.

In Europe, there was a well-developed genre of napkin folding, which flourished during the 17th and 18th centuries. After this period, this genre declined and was mostly forgotten; historian Joan Sallas attributes this to the introduction of porcelain, which replaced complex napkin folds as a dinner-table status symbol among nobility. However, some of the techniques and bases associated with this tradition continued to be a part of European culture; folding was a significant part of Friedrich Fröbel's "Kindergarten" method, and the designs published in connection with his curriculum are stylistically similar to the napkin fold repertoire. Another example of early origami in Europe is the "pajarita," a stylized bird whose origins date from at least the nineteenth century.

==== Since 1800s ====
When Japan opened its borders in the 1860s, as part of a modernization strategy, they imported Fröbel's Kindergarten system—and with it, German ideas about paperfolding. This included the ban on cuts, and the starting shape of a bicolored square. These ideas, and some of the European folding repertoire, were integrated into the Japanese tradition. Before this, traditional Japanese sources use a variety of starting shapes, often had cuts, and if they had color or markings, these were added after the model was folded. In Japan, the first kindergarten was established in 1875, and origami was promoted as part of early childhood education. The kindergarten's 1877 regulations listed 25 activities, including origami subjects. Shōkokumin (小国民), a magazine for boys, frequently published articles on origami. Origami Zusetsu (折紙図説), published in 1908, clearly distinguished ceremonial origami from recreational origami. These books and magazines carried both the traditional Japanese style of origami and the style inspired by Fröbel.

In the early 1900s, Akira Yoshizawa, Kosho Uchiyama, and others began creating and recording original origami works. Akira Yoshizawa in particular was responsible for a number of innovations, such as wet-folding and the Yoshizawa–Randlett diagramming system, and his work inspired a renaissance of the art form.

In 1974, origami was offered in the USSR as an additional activity for elementary school children.

During the 1980s a number of folders started systematically studying the mathematical properties of folded forms, which led to a rapid increase in the complexity of origami models.

Starting in the late 20th century, there has been a renewed interest in understanding the behavior of folding matter, both artistically and scientifically. The "new origami," which distinguishes it from old craft practices, has had a rapid evolution due to the contribution of computational mathematics and the development of techniques such as box-pleating, tessellations and wet-folding. Artists like Robert J. Lang, Erik Demaine, Sipho Mabona, Giang Dinh, Paul Jackson, and others, are frequently cited for advancing new applications of the art. The computational facet and the interchanges through social networks, where new techniques and designs are introduced, have raised the profile of origami in the 21st century.

== Techniques and materials ==
=== Techniques ===
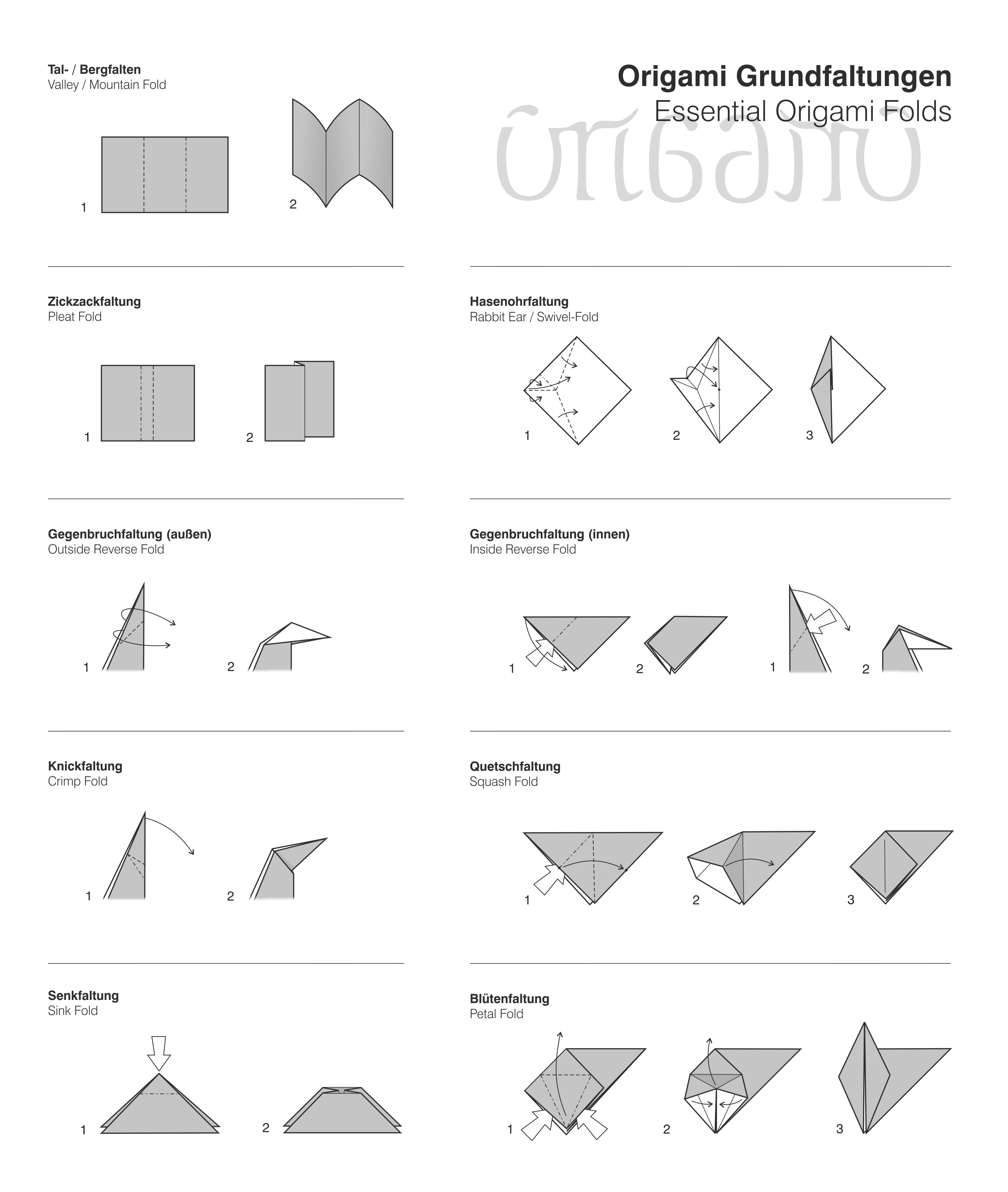
A list of nine basic origami folds: the valley (or mountain), the pleat, the rabbit ear, the outside reverse, the inside reverse, the crimp, the squash, the sink and the petal

Many origami books begin with a description of basic origami techniques which are used to construct the models. This includes simple diagrams of basic folds like valley and mountain folds, pleats, reverse folds, squash folds, and sinks. There are also standard named bases which are used in a wide variety of models, for instance the bird base is an intermediate stage in the construction of the flapping bird. Additional bases are the preliminary base (square base), fish base, waterbomb base, and the frog base.

=== Origami paper ===
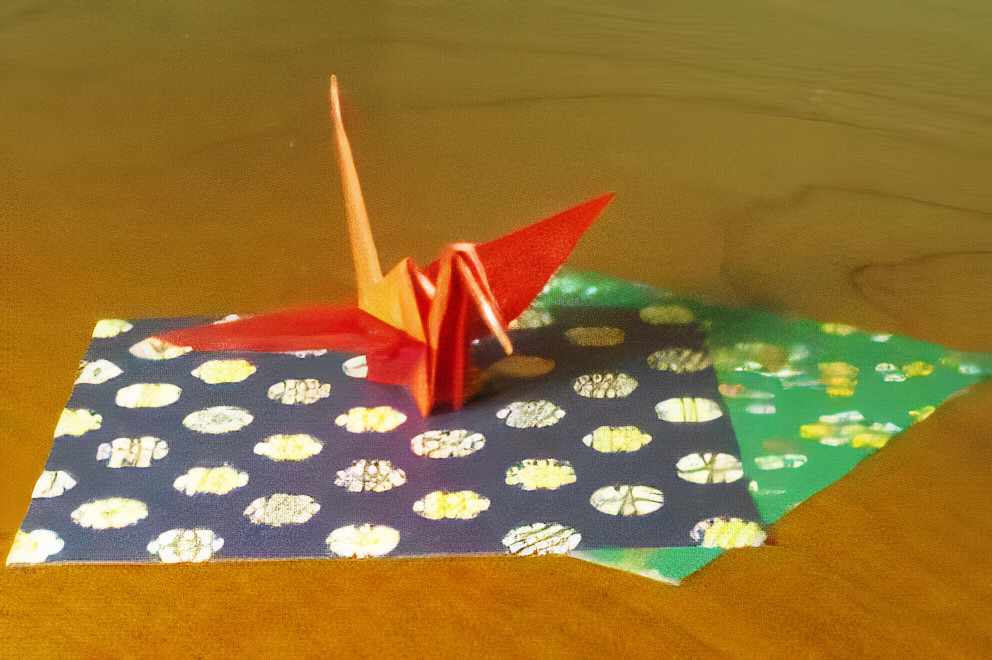
A crane and papers of the same size used to fold it

Almost any laminar (flat) material can be used for folding; the only requirement is that it should hold a crease.

Origami paper, often referred to as "kami" (Japanese for paper), is sold in prepackaged squares of various sizes ranging from 2.5 cm (1 in) to 25 cm (10 in) or more. It is commonly colored on one side and white on the other; however, dual coloured and patterned versions exist and can be used effectively for color-changed models. Origami paper weighs slightly less than copy paper, making it suitable for a wider range of models.

Normal copy paper with weights of 70–90 g/m^{2} (19–24 lb) can be used for simple folds, such as the crane and waterbomb. Heavier weight papers of 100 g/m^{2} (approx. 25 lb) or more can be wet-folded. This technique allows for a more rounded sculpting of the model, which becomes rigid and sturdy when it is dry.

Foil-backed paper, as its name implies, is a sheet of thin foil glued to a sheet of thin paper. Related to this is tissue foil, which is made by gluing a thin piece of tissue paper to kitchen aluminium foil. A second piece of tissue can be glued onto the reverse side to produce a tissue/foil/tissue sandwich. Foil-backed paper is available commercially, but not tissue foil; it must be handmade. Both types of foil materials are suitable for complex models.

Washi (和紙) is the traditional origami paper used in Japan. Washi is generally tougher than ordinary paper made from wood pulp, and is used in many traditional arts. Washi is commonly made using fibres from the bark of the gampi tree, the mitsumata shrub (Edgeworthia papyrifera), or the paper mulberry but can also be made using bamboo, hemp, rice, and wheat.

Artisan papers such as unryu, lokta, hanji, gampi, kozo, saa, and abaca have long fibers and are often extremely strong. As these papers are floppy to start with, they are often backcoated or resized with methylcellulose or wheat paste before folding. Also, these papers are extremely thin and compressible, allowing for thin, narrowed limbs as in the case of insect models.

Paper money from various countries is also popular to create origami with; this is known variously as Dollar Origami, Orikane, and Money Origami.

=== Tools ===
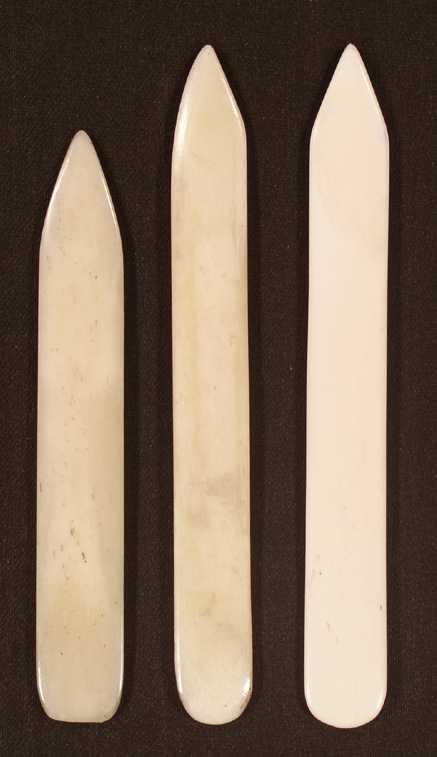
Bone folders

It is common to fold using a flat surface, but some folders like doing it in the air with no tools, especially when displaying the folding. Some folders believe that no tool should be used when folding. However a couple of tools can help especially with the more complex models. For instance a bone folder allows sharp creases to be made in the paper easily, paper clips can act as extra pairs of fingers, and tweezers can be used to make small folds. When making complex models from origami crease patterns, it can help to use a ruler and ballpoint embosser to score the creases. Completed models can be sprayed so that they keep their shape better, and a spray is needed when wet folding.

== Types ==
=== Action origami ===
In addition to the more common still-life origami, there are also moving object designs; origami can move. Action origami includes origami that flies, requires inflation to complete, or, when complete, uses the kinetic energy of a person's hands, applied at a certain region on the model, to move another flap or limb. Some argue that, strictly speaking, only the latter is really "recognized" as action origami. Action origami, first appearing with the traditional Japanese flapping bird, is quite common. One example is Robert Lang's instrumentalists; when the figures' heads are pulled away from their bodies, their hands will move, resembling the playing of music.

=== Modular origami ===
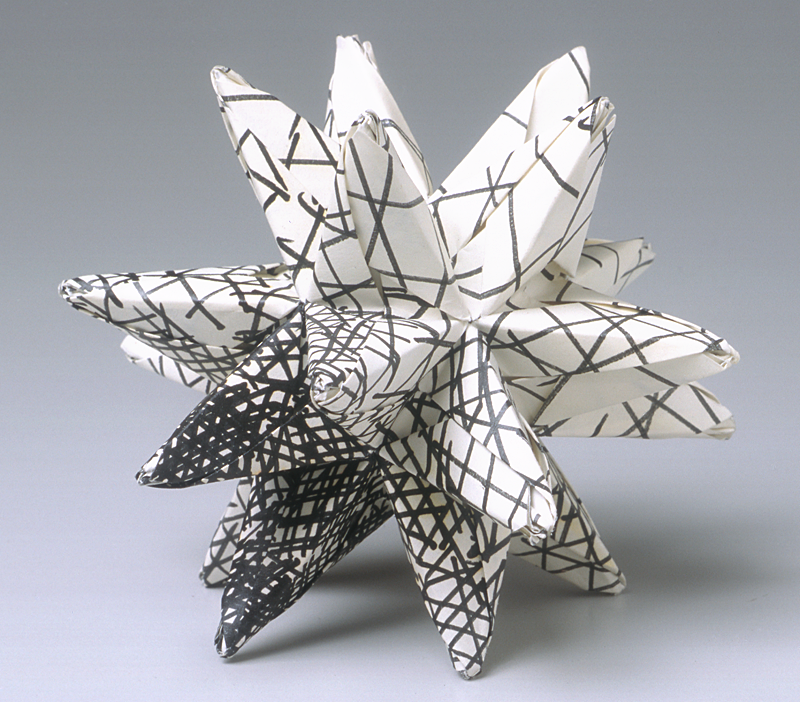
A stellated icosahedron made from custom papers

Modular origami consists of putting a number of identical pieces together to form a complete model. Often the individual pieces are simple, but the final assembly may be more difficult. Many modular origami models are decorative folding balls such as kusudama, which differ from classical origami in that the pieces may be held together using thread or glue.

Chinese paper folding, a cousin of origami, includes a similar style called golden venture folding where large numbers of pieces are put together to create elaborate models. This style is most commonly known as "3D origami". However, that name did not appear until Joie Staff published a series of books titled 3D Origami, More 3D Origami, and More and More 3D Origami. This style originated from some Chinese refugees while they were detained in America and is also called Golden Venture folding from the ship they came on.

=== Wet-folding ===
Wet-folding is an origami technique for producing models with gentle curves rather than geometric straight folds and flat surfaces. The paper is dampened so it can be moulded easily, and the final model keeps its shape when it dries. It can be used, for instance, to produce very natural looking animal models. Size, an adhesive that is crisp and hard when dry, but dissolves in water when wet and becoming soft and flexible, is often applied to the paper either at the pulp stage while the paper is being formed, or on the surface of a ready sheet of paper. The latter method is called external sizing and most commonly uses Methylcellulose, or MC, paste, or various plant starches.

=== Pureland origami ===
Pureland origami adds the restrictions that only simple mountain/valley folds may be used, and all folds must have straightforward locations. It was developed by John Smith in the 1970s to help inexperienced folders or those with limited motor skills. Some designers also like the challenge of creating within the very strict constraints.

=== Origami tessellations ===
Origami tessellation is a branch that has grown in popularity after 2000. A tessellation is a collection of figures filling a plane with no gaps or overlaps. In origami tessellations, pleats are used to connect molecules such as twist folds together in a repeating fashion. During the 1960s, Shuzo Fujimoto was the first to explore twist fold tessellations in any systematic way, coming up with dozens of patterns and establishing the genre in the origami mainstream. Around the same time period, Ron Resch patented some tessellation patterns as part of his explorations into kinetic sculpture and developable surfaces, although his work was not known by the origami community until the 1980s. Chris Palmer is an artist who has extensively explored tessellations after seeing the Zilij patterns in the Alhambra, and has found ways to create detailed origami tessellations out of silk. Robert Lang and Alex Bateman are two designers who use computer programs to create origami tessellations. The first international convention devoted to origami tessellations was hosted in Brasília (Brazil) in 2006, and the first instruction book on tessellation folding patterns was published by Eric Gjerde in 2008. Since then, the field has grown very quickly. Tessellation artists include Polly Verity (Scotland); Joel Cooper, Christine Edison, Ray Schamp and Goran Konjevod from the US; Roberto Gretter (Italy); Christiane Bettens (Switzerland); Carlos Natan López (Mexico); and Jorge C. Lucero (Brazil).

=== Kirigami ===
Kirigami is a Japanese term for paper cutting. Cutting was often used in traditional Japanese origami, but modern innovations in technique have made the use of cuts unnecessary. Most origami designers no longer consider models with cuts to be origami, instead using the term Kirigami to describe them. This change in attitude occurred during the 1960s and 70s, so early origami books often use cuts, but for the most part they have disappeared from the modern origami repertoire, and most modern books do not even mention cutting.

=== Strip folding ===
Strip folding is a combination of paper folding and paper weaving. A common example of strip folding is called the Lucky Star, also called Chinese lucky star, dream star, wishing star, or simply origami star. Another common fold is the Moravian star which is made by strip folding in a 3-dimensional design to include 16 spikes.

=== Teabag folding ===
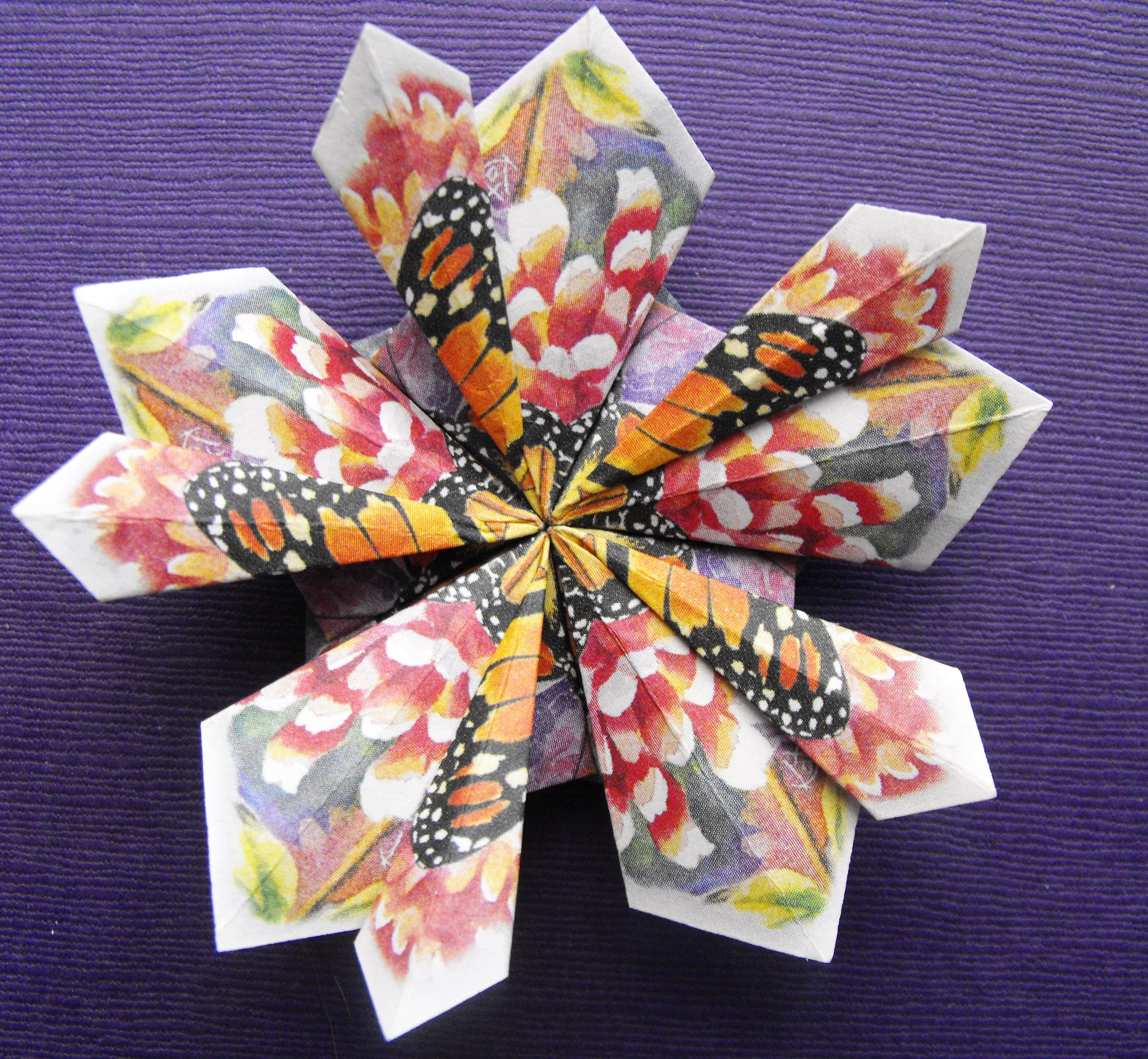
Example of folded "tea bag" paper

Teabag folding is credited to Dutch artist Tiny van der Plas, who developed the technique in 1992 as a papercraft art for embellishing greeting cards. It uses small square pieces of paper (e.g., a tea bag wrapper) bearing symmetrical designs that are folded in such a way that they interlock and produce a three-dimensional version of the underlying design. The basic kite fold is used to produce rosettes that are a 3 dimensional version of the 2D design.

The basic rosette design requires eight matching squares to be folded into the 'kite' design. Mathematics teachers find the designs very useful as a practical way of demonstrating some basic properties of symmetry.

== Mathematics and technical origami ==
=== Mathematics and practical applications ===
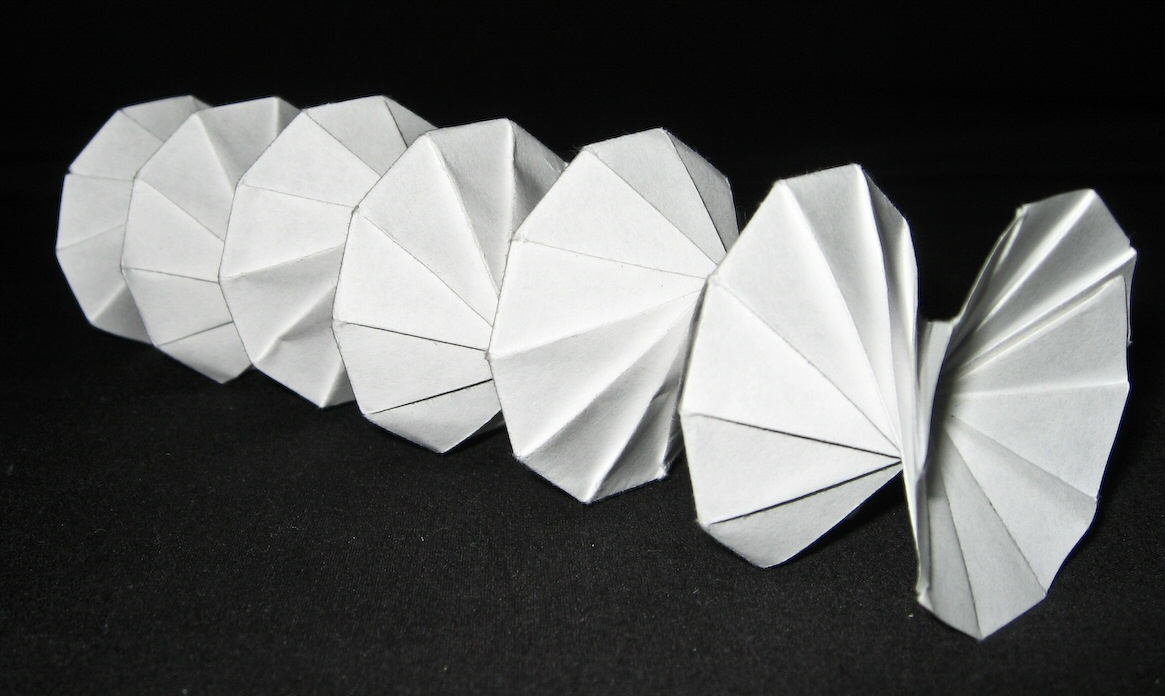
Spring Into Action, designed by Jeff Beynon, made from a single rectangular piece of paper

The practice and study of origami encapsulates several subjects of mathematical interest. For instance, the problem of flat-foldability (whether a crease pattern can be folded into a 2-dimensional model) has been a topic of considerable mathematical study.

A number of technological advances have come from insights obtained through paper folding. For example, techniques have been developed for the deployment of car airbags and stent implants from a folded position.

The problem of rigid origami ("if we replaced the paper with sheet metal and had hinges in place of the crease lines, could we still fold the model?") has great practical importance. For example, the Miura map fold is a rigid fold that has been used to deploy large solar panel arrays for space satellites.

Origami can be used to construct various geometrical designs not possible with compass and straightedge constructions. For instance paper folding may be used for angle trisection and doubling the cube.

Origami can be used to represent chemical models of protein structures as educational tools.

=== Technical origami ===
Technical origami, known in Japanese as origami sekkei (折り紙設計), is an origami design approach in which the model is conceived as an engineered crease pattern, rather than developed through trial-and-error. With advances in origami mathematics, the basic structure of a new origami model can be theoretically plotted out on paper before any actual folding even occurs. This method of origami design was developed by Robert Lang, Meguro Toshiyuki and others, and allows for the creation of extremely complex multi-limbed models such as many-legged centipedes, human figures with a full complement of fingers and toes, and the like.

The crease pattern is a layout of the creases required to form the structure of the model. Paradoxically enough, when origami designers come up with a crease pattern for a new design, the majority of the smaller creases are relatively unimportant and added only towards the completion of the model. What is more important is the allocation of regions of the paper and how these are mapped to the structure of the object being designed. By opening up a folded model, you can observe the structures that comprise it; the study of these structures led to a number of crease-pattern-oriented design approaches

The pattern of allocations is referred to as the 'circle-packing' or 'polygon-packing'. Using optimization algorithms, a circle-packing figure can be computed for any uniaxial base of arbitrary complexity. Once this figure is computed, the creases which are then used to obtain the base structure can be added. This is not a unique mathematical process, hence it is possible for two designs to have the same circle-packing, and yet different crease pattern structures.

As a circle encloses the maximum amount of area for a given perimeter, circle packing allows for maximum efficiency in terms of paper usage. However, other polygonal shapes can be used to solve the packing problem as well. The use of polygonal shapes other than circles is often motivated by the desire to find easily locatable creases (such as multiples of 22.5 degrees) and hence an easier folding sequence as well. One popular offshoot of the circle packing method is box-pleating, where squares are used instead of circles. As a result, the crease pattern that arises from this method contains only 45 and 90 degree angles, which often makes for a more direct folding sequence.

=== Origami-related computer programs ===
A number of computer aids to origami such as TreeMaker and Oripa, have been devised. TreeMaker allows new origami bases to be designed for special purposes and Oripa tries to calculate the folded shape from the crease pattern.

== Ethics and copyright ==
Copyright in origami designs and the use of models has become an increasingly important issue in the origami community, as the internet has made the sale and distribution of pirated designs very easy. It is considered good etiquette to always credit the original artist and the folder when displaying origami models. It has been claimed that all commercial rights to designs and models are typically reserved by origami artists; however, the degree to which this can be enforced has been disputed. Under such a view, a person who folds a model using a legally obtained design could publicly display the model unless such rights were specifically reserved, whereas folding a design for money or commercial use of a photo for instance would require consent. The Origami Authors and Creators group was set up to represent the copyright interests of origami artists and facilitate permissions requests.

However, a court in Japan has asserted that the folding method of an origami model "comprises an idea and not a creative expression, and thus is not protected under the copyright law". Further, the court stated that "the method to folding origami is in the public domain; one cannot avoid using the same folding creases or the same arrows to show the direction in which to fold the paper". Therefore, it is legal to redraw the folding instructions of a model of another author even if the redrawn instructions share similarities to the original ones, as long as those similarities are "functional in nature". The redrawn instructions may be published (and even sold) without necessity of any permission from the original author.

== Gallery ==
These pictures show examples of various types of origami.

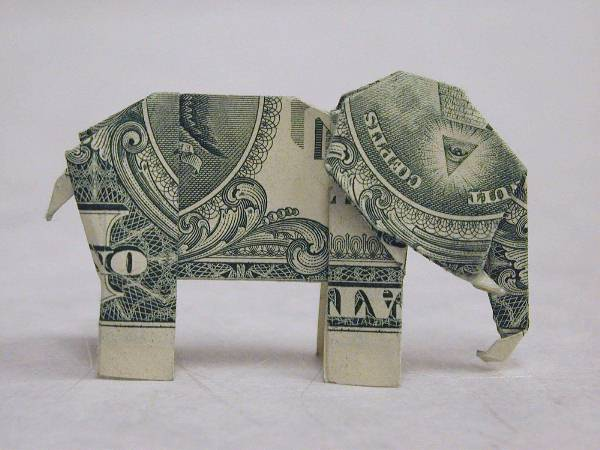
Dollar bill elephant, an example of moneygami

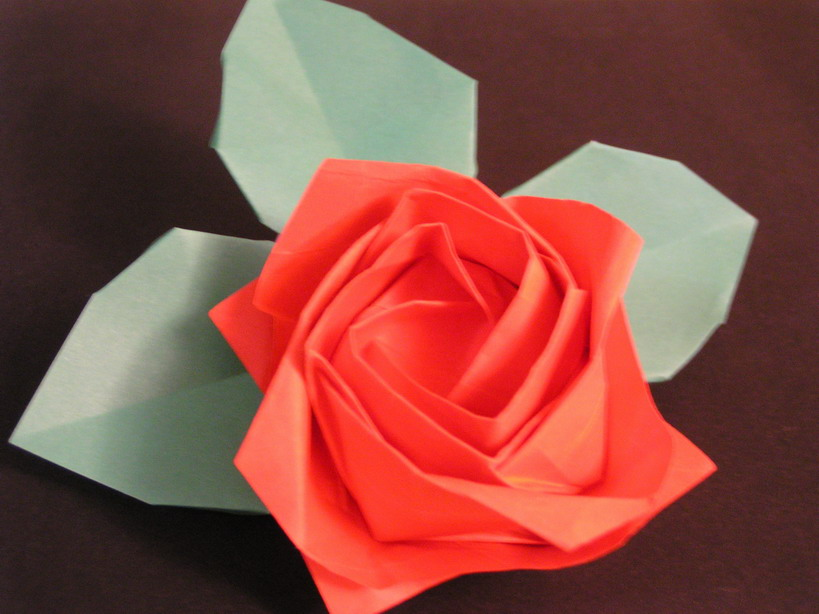
Kawasaki rose using the twist fold devised by Toshikazu Kawasaki. The calyx is made separately.

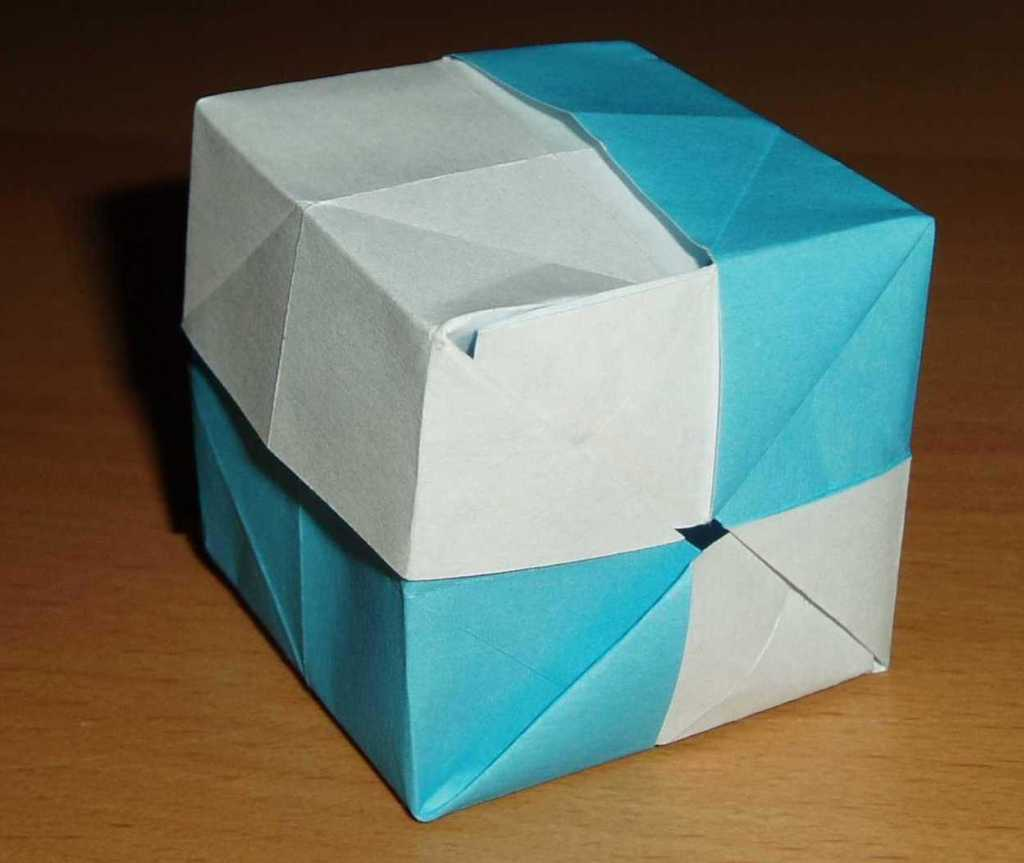
Kawasaki cube, an example of an iso-area model

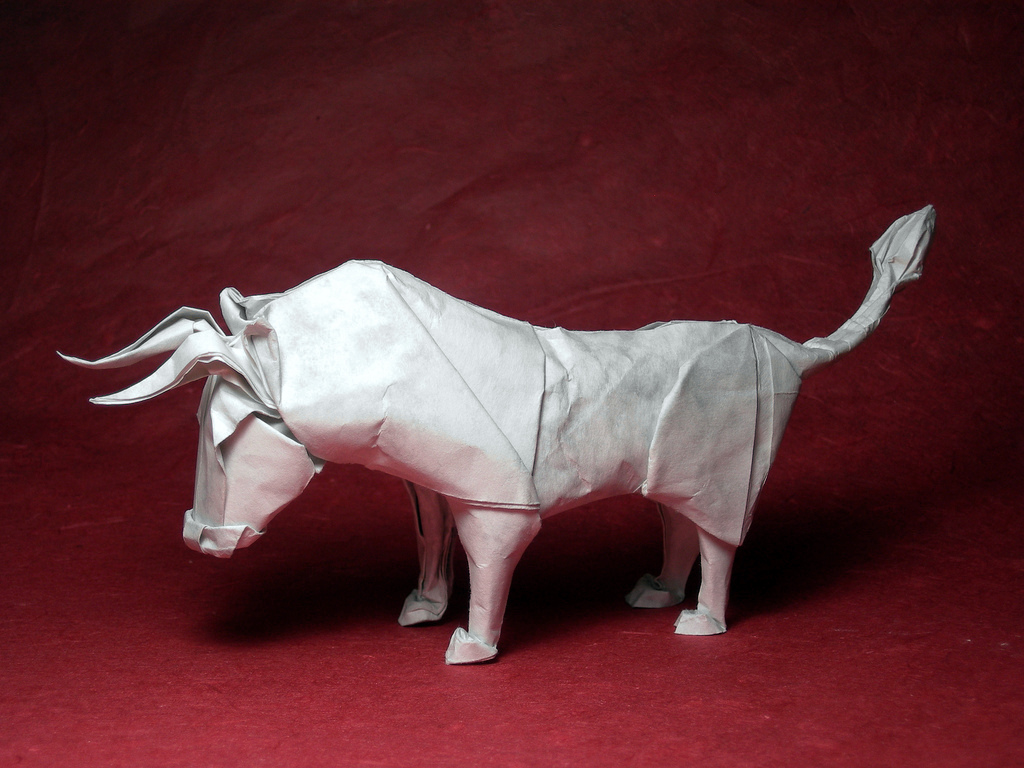
A wet-folded bull

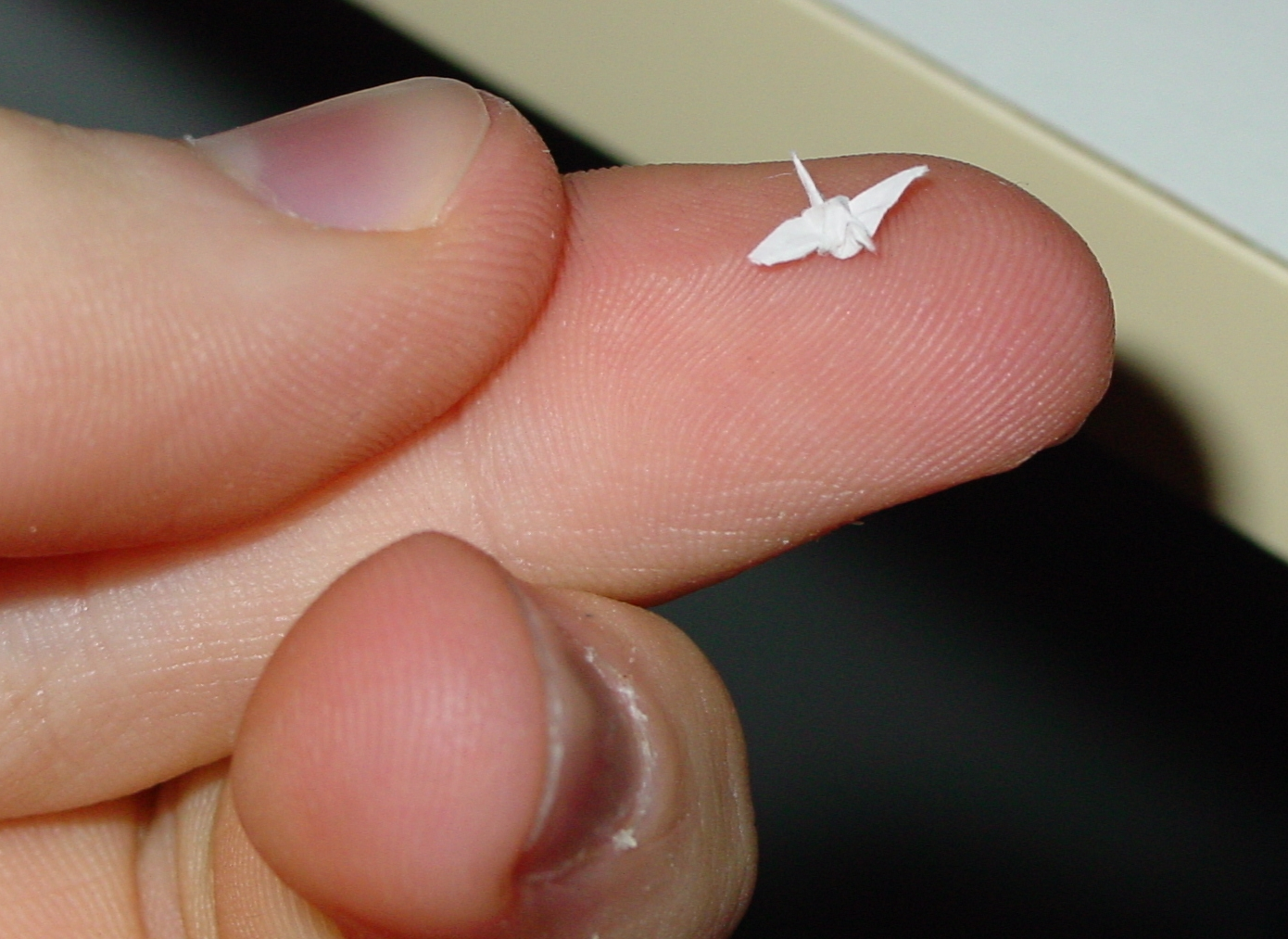
A challenging miniature version of a paper crane

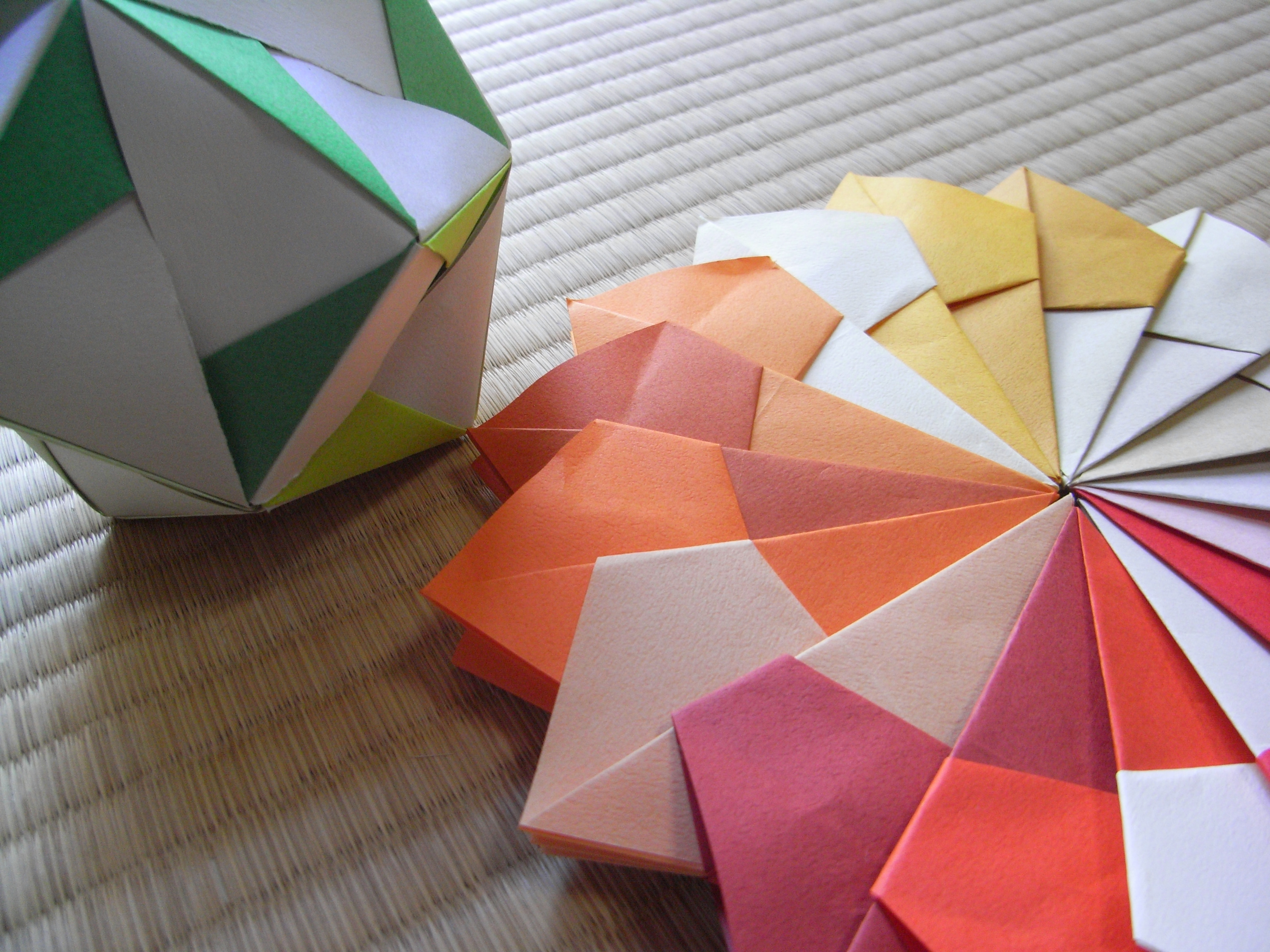
Two examples of modular origami

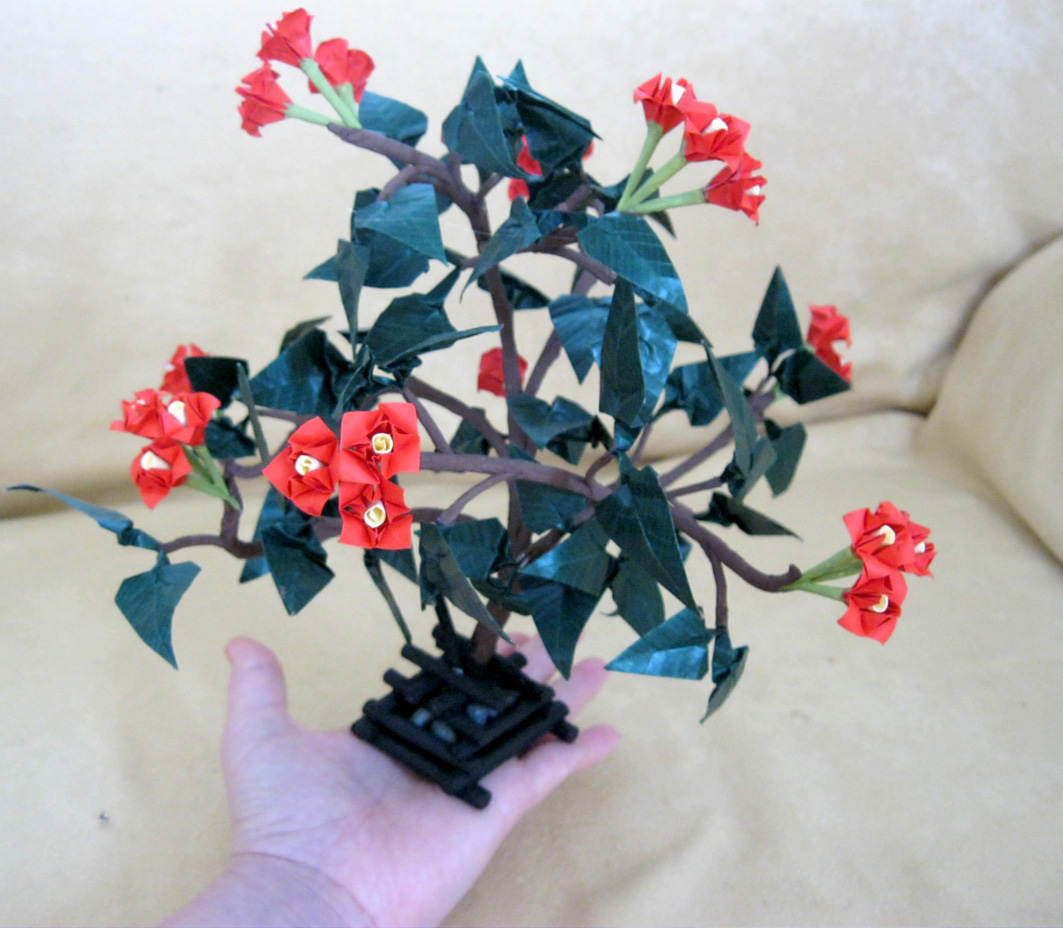
An example of origami bonsai

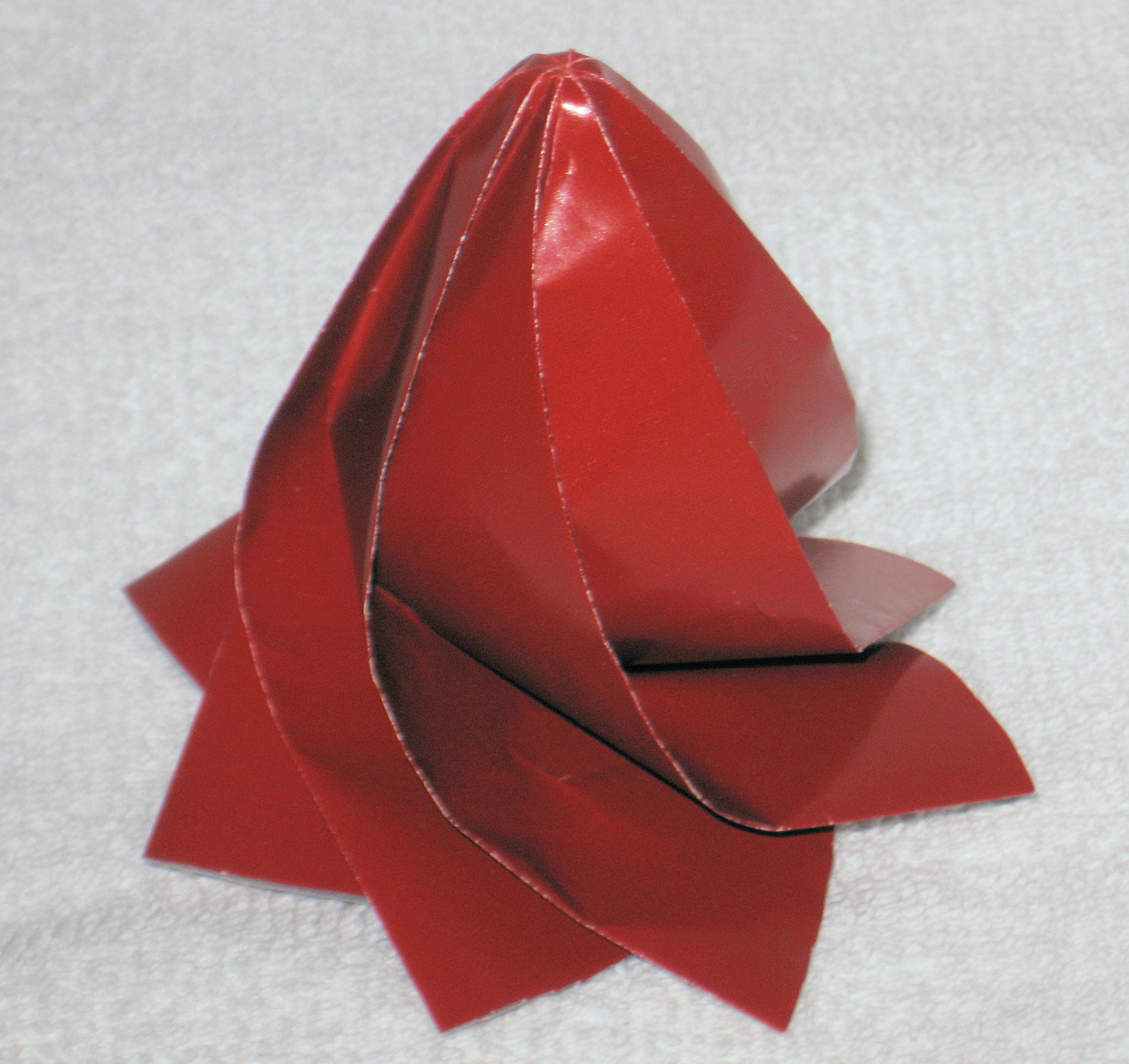
Smart Waterbomb using circular paper and curved folds

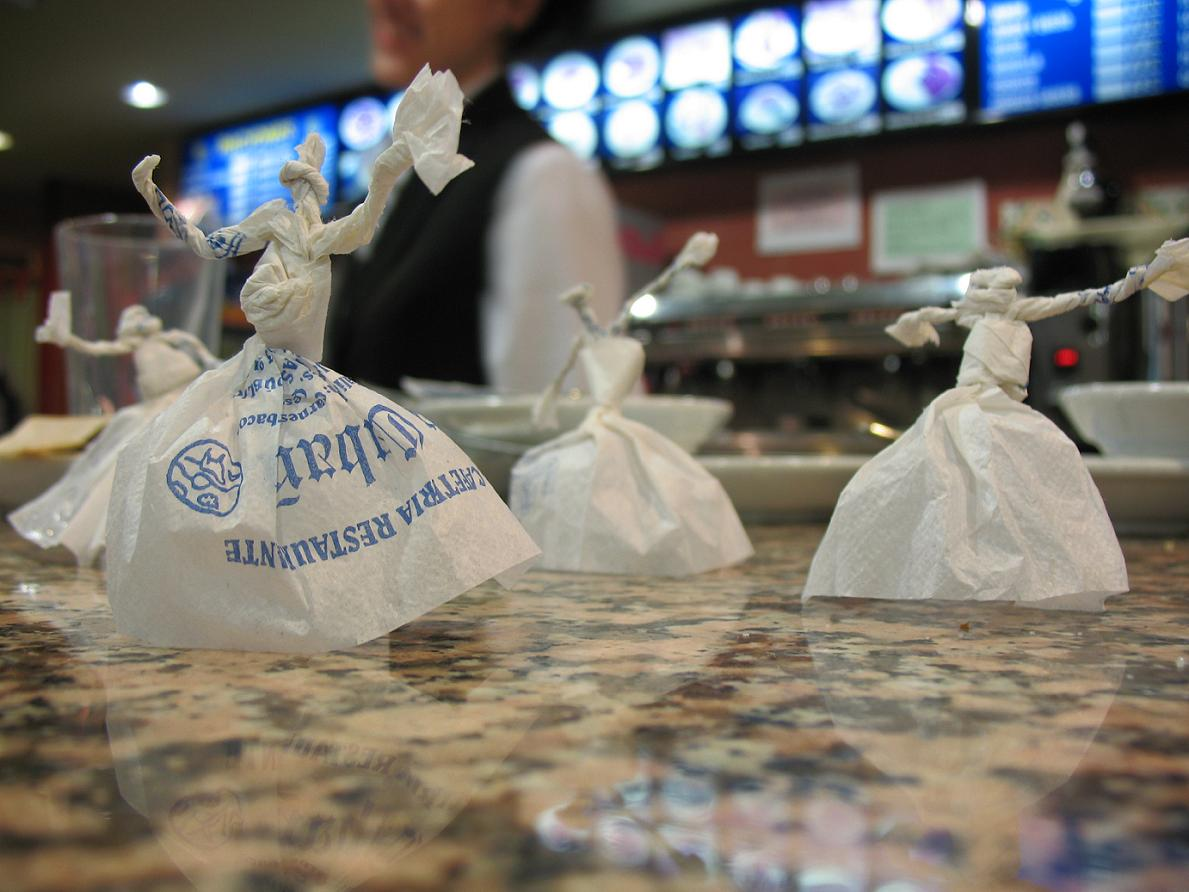
Flamenco dancers made using a wet fold and twisting/tying technique

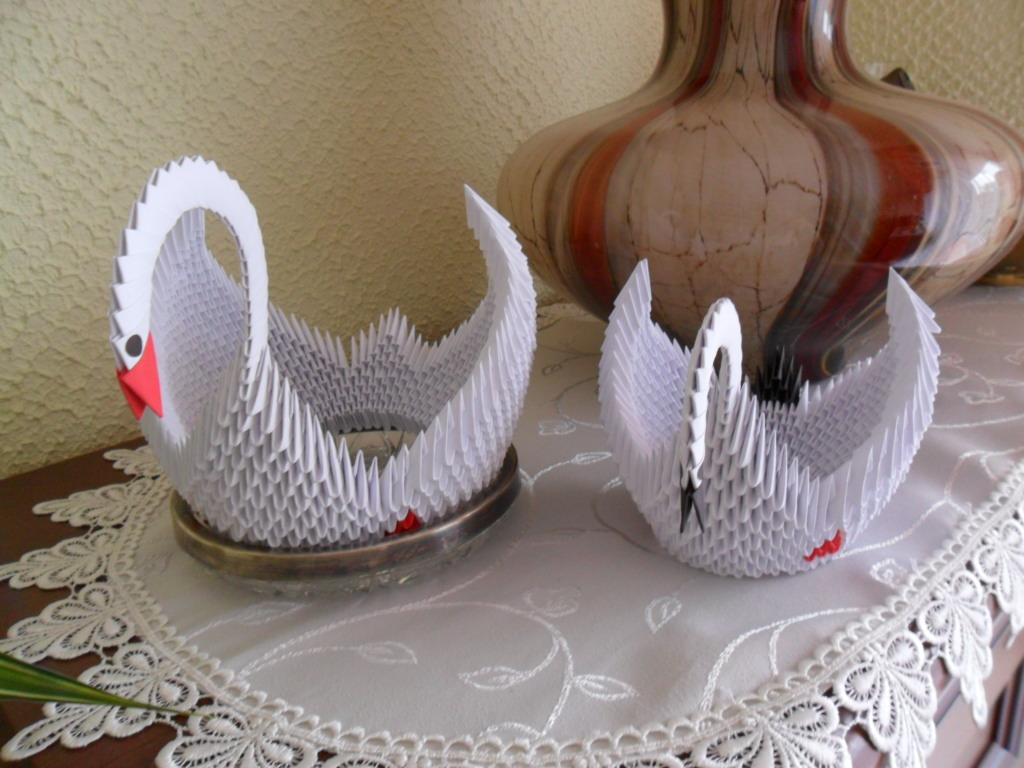
Chinese Golden Venture swans

== In popular culture ==
- In House of Cards season 1, episode 6, Claire Underwood gives a homeless man cash, and he later returns it folded into the shape of a bird. Claire then begins making origami animals, and in episode 7 she gives several to Peter Russo for his children.
- In Blade Runner, Gaff folds origami throughout the movie, and an origami unicorn he folds forms a major plot point.
- In the children's novel The Strange Case of Origami Yoda by Tom Angleberger, Dwight creates an origami finger puppet of Yoda from Star Wars, which he uses to give advice to his middle school classmates. Tommy, Dwight's classmate and the book's protagonist, attempts to investigate whether Origami Yoda has the power to predict the future or is just a hoax created by Dwight. The book also includes instructions for readers to create their own origami Yoda puppet.
- The philosophy and plot of the science fiction story "Ghostweight" by Yoon Ha Lee revolve around origami. In it, origami serves as a metaphor for history: "It is not true that the dead cannot be folded. Square becomes kite becomes swan; history becomes rumor becomes song. Even the act of remembrance creases the truth". A major element of the plot is the weaponry called jerengjen of space mercenaries, which unfold from flat shapes: "In the streets, jerengjen unfolded prettily, expanding into artillery with dragon-shaped shadows and sleek four-legged assault robots with wolf-shaped shadows. In the skies, jerengjen unfolded into bombers with kestrel-shaped shadows." The story says that the word means the art of paper folding in the mercenaries' main language. In an interview, when asked about the subject, the author tells that he became fascinated with dimensions since reading the novel Flatland.
- In the BBC television program QI, it is reported that origami in the form it is commonly known, where paper is folded without being cut or glued likely originated in Germany and was imported to Japan as late as 1860 when Japan opened its borders (However, it is confirmed that paper cranes using this technique have existed in Japan since the Edo period before 1860).
- Paper Mario: The Origami King is a 2020 Nintendo Switch game featuring Mario series characters in an origami-themed world.

== See also ==
- Chinese paper folding
- Fold-forming
- Furoshiki
- Japanese art
- List of origamists
- Origamic architecture
- Paper craft
- Paper fortune teller
- Paper plane
- Pop-up book
