= Staircase paradox =

Curves whose limit does not preserve length

Staircases converging pointwise to the diagonal of a unit square, but not converging to its length

In mathematical analysis, the staircase paradox is a pathological example showing that limits of curves do not necessarily preserve their length.

== Description ==
The paradox consists of a sequence of "staircase" polygonal chains in a unit square, formed from horizontal and vertical line segments of decreasing length, so that these staircases converge uniformly to the diagonal of the square. However, each staircase has length two, while the length of the diagonal is the square root of 2 (approximately 1.4142), so the sequence of staircase lengths does not converge to the length of the diagonal.

Martin Gardner calls this "an ancient geometrical paradox". The staircase paradox shows that, for curves under uniform convergence, the length of a curve is not a continuous function of the curve.

== Explanation ==
For any smooth curve, polygonal chains with segment lengths decreasing to zero, connecting consecutive vertices along the curve, always converge to the arc length. The failure of the staircase curves to converge to the correct length can be explained by the fact that some of their vertices do not lie on the diagonal.

== Usage ==
A fallacious approach to calculating the circumference of a circle due to the staircase paradox

As well as highlighting the need for careful definitions of arc length in mathematics education, the staircase paradox has applications in digital geometry, where it motivates methods of estimating the perimeter of pixelated shapes that do not merely sum the lengths of boundaries between pixels.

In higher dimensions, the Schwarz lantern provides an analogous example showing that polyhedral surfaces that converge pointwise to a curved surface do not necessarily converge to its area, even when the vertices all lie on the surface.

== See also ==
- Coastline paradox, similar paradox where a straight segment approximation diverges
- Aliasing, a more general phenomenon of inaccuracies caused by pixelation
- Cantor staircase, a fractal curve along the diagonal of a unit square
- Taxicab geometry, in which the lengths of the staircases and of the diagonal are equal
