= Nonobtuse mesh =

Polygon mesh composed of triangles with no obtuse angles

In computer graphics, a nonobtuse triangle mesh is a polygon mesh composed of a set of triangles in which no angle is obtuse, i.e. greater than 90°. If each (triangle) face angle is strictly less than 90°, then the triangle mesh is said to be acute. Every polygon with $n$ sides has a nonobtuse triangulation with $O(n)$ triangles (expressed in big O notation), allowing some triangle vertices to be added to the sides and interior of the polygon. These nonobtuse triangulations can be further refined to produce acute triangulations with $O(n)$ triangles.

Nonobtuse meshes avoid certain problems of nonconvergence or of convergence to the wrong numerical solution as demonstrated by the Schwarz lantern. The immediate benefits of a nonobtuse or acute mesh include more efficient and more accurate geodesic computation using fast marching, and guaranteed validity for planar mesh embeddings via discrete harmonic maps.

== See also ==
- Triangle mesh
