= Jun Maekawa =

Japanese software engineer

Jun Maekawa (前川 淳, Maekawa Jun; 1958-) is a Japanese software engineer, mathematician, and origami artist. He is known for popularizing the method of utilizing crease patterns in designing origami models, with his 1985 publication Viva Origami, as well as other paperfolding-related theorems and mathematical analysis. By the late 1980s, he was among the origami designers whose technical advances enabled increasingly complex folded subjects, including creatures and insects with multiple legs and antennae. One of them being Maekawa's theorem in relation to the flat-foldability of origami models.

Maekawa currently serves on the committee board of the Japanese Origami Academic Society (JOAS), of which he also served as the committee-chief in the previous years. Outside of extensive research in mathematical-related topics, he also publishes articles on origami-related history and occurrences in the JOAS publications. He is the president of a software firm in Japan, and a member of the Astronomical Society of Japan.

== Publications ==
- Viva Origami, 1985
- Genuine Origami (本格折り紙), 2007
- Genuine Origami $\scriptstyle \sqrt{2}$, 2009
- Folding Geometry, 2016

== See also ==
- Mathematics of paper folding
