= Toshikazu Kawasaki =

Japanese paperfolder (1955–2026)

Toshikazu Kawasaki (川崎敏和, Kawasaki Toshikazu; November 26, 1955 – March 4, 2026) was a Japanese paperfolder and origami theorist who was known for his geometrically innovative models. He was particularly famous for his series of fourfold symmetry "roses", all based on a twisting maneuver that allows the petals to seem to curl out from the center of the flower. Kawasaki also taught mathematics at Sasebo Technical Junior College.

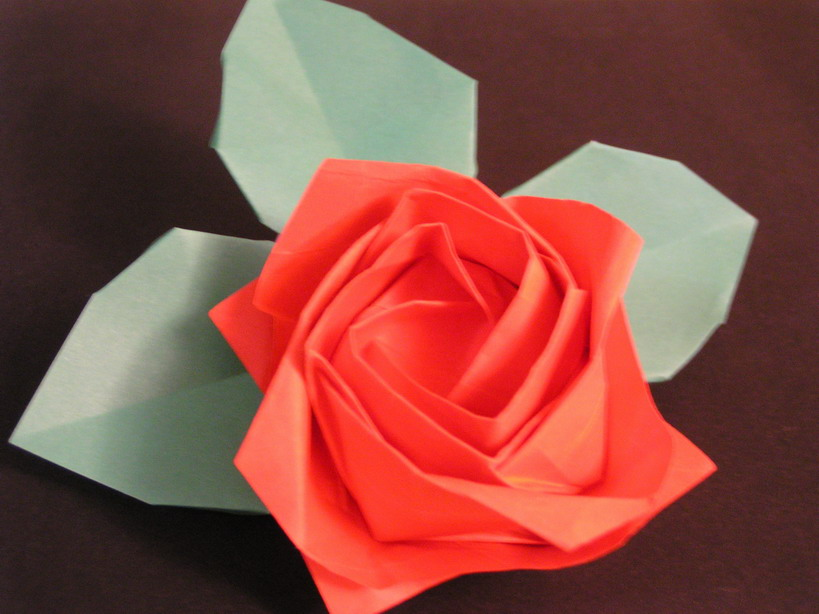
Kawasaki new rose

== Life and career ==
Kawasaki was born in Kurume, Fukuoka on November 26, 1955. He was the first to develop the technique of iso-area folding, which allows the folder to end up with each side of the paper displayed in equal amounts. It consists of building a mirror-symmetrical crease pattern and then collapsing it to find a finished form, usually a geometric shape such as a cube. He also discovered and proved that with any given flat point in an origami model, the sum of alternating angles is always equal to 180 degrees, a result now known as Kawasaki's theorem.

Kawasaki died in a house fire at his home, on March 4, 2026, at the age of 70.

== Publications ==
- Origami^6, American Math Society, (2015)
- The Greatest Dream Origami, Asahi Press, (2009)

== Resources ==
- Kunihiko Kasahara and Toshie Takahama, Origami for the Connoisseur. Japan Publications.
