= Tom Hull (mathematician) =

Thomas C. Hull is an associate professor of applied mathematics at Franklin & Marshall College and is known for his expertise in the mathematics of paper folding.

== Career ==
Hull was an undergraduate at Hampshire College. He earned a master's degree and Ph.D. in mathematics at the University of Rhode Island. His 1997 dissertation, Some Problems in List Coloring Bipartite Graphs, involved graph coloring, and was supervised by Nancy Eaton.

Prior to his appointment at Franklin & Marshall College, Hull taught at Merrimack College (1997–2008) and Western New England University (2008–2023). He has also taught at the Hampshire College Summer Studies in Mathematics for many years: as junior staff from 1991 to 1995, and as senior staff in 1998 to 2007. Since 2013, he has taught at MathILy, an intensive residential summer program for mathematically excellent high school students.

Hull was a member of the board of directors of origami association OrigamiUSA from 1995 to 2008.

== Author ==
Hull is the author or co-author of several books on origami, including:

- Origametry: Mathematical Methods in Paper Folding (Cambridge University Press, 2021)
- Project Origami: Activities for Exploring Mathematics (AK Peters, 2006; 2nd ed., CRC Press, 2013)
- Russian Origami: 40 Original Models Designed by the Top Folders in the Former Soviet Union (with Sergei Afonkin, St. Martin's Press, 1998)
- Origami, Plain and Simple (with Robert E. Neale, St. Martin's Press, 1994)

He is also featured in the 2010 origami documentary Between the Folds.

== Awards and honors ==
With Tomohiro Tachi of the University of Tokyo, Hull was the recipient of the 2016 A. T. Yang Memorial Award in Theoretical Kinematics of the American Society of Mechanical Engineers, for their joint work on predicting the motion of rigid origami patterns when forces are applied to them in their flat state.
