= Crease pattern =

Origami diagram type

Crease pattern for a swordsman

A crease pattern (commonly referred to as a CP) is an origami diagram that consists of all or most of the creases in the final model, rendered into one image. This is useful for diagramming complex and super-complex models, where the model is often not simple enough to diagram efficiently.

The use of crease patterns originated with designers such as Neal Elias, who used them to record how their models were made. This allowed the more prolific designers to keep track of all their models, and soon crease patterns began to be used as a means for communication of ideas between designers. After a few years of this sort of use, designers such as Robert J. Lang, Meguro Toshiyuki, Jun Maekawa and Peter Engel began to design using crease patterns. This allowed them to create with increasing levels of complexity, and the art of origami reached unprecedented levels of realism. Now most higher-level models are accompanied by crease patterns.

Although not intended as a substitute for diagrams, folding from crease patterns is starting to gain in popularity, partly because of the challenge of being able to 'crack' the pattern, and also partly because the crease pattern is often the only resource available to fold a given model, should the designer choose not to produce diagrams. For example, an algorithm for the automatic development of crease patterns for certain polyhedra with discrete rotational symmetry by composing right frusta has been implemented via a CAD program. The program allows users to specify a target polyhedron and generate a crease pattern that folds into it. Still, there are many cases in which designers wish to sequence the steps of their models but lack the means to design clear diagrams. Such origamists occasionally resort to the sequenced crease pattern (SCP) which is a set of crease patterns showing the creases up to each respective fold. The SCP eliminates the need for diagramming programs or artistic ability while maintaining the step-by-step process for other folders to see. Another name for the sequenced crease pattern is the progressive crease pattern (PCP).

== Mathematical properties ==
A flat-folded origami model is not fully specified by crease locations alone, because mountain-valley assignment and the stacking order of the folded layers are also required. In origami research, a crease pattern is called flat-foldable if it can be folded flat without adding new creases. For a crease pattern with a single interior vertex, Maekawa's theorem gives the mountain-valley count condition and Kawasaki's theorem gives the angle condition, but for patterns with multiple vertices those conditions are necessary rather than sufficient for global flat-foldability.
