= Fedor Fomin =

Computer scientist

Fedor V. Fomin
- Фёдор Владимирович Фомин
- Born: 1968 (age 57–58); Leningrad, USSR
- Education: St. Petersburg State University
- Known for: bidimensionality, measure and conquer, kernelization
- Awards: Nerode Prize ×3, ACM Fellow, EATCS Fellow
- Scientific career
- Fields: Algorithms, parameterized complexity, graph theory
- Workplaces: University of Bergen
- Thesis: Задачи преследования и поиска на графах (Pursuit-evasion and Search Problems on Graphs) (1997)
- Doctoral advisor: Nikolai Nikolaevich Petrov

Fedor V. Fomin (born 1968) is a Russian-Norwegian computer scientist and professor of computer science at the University of Bergen. He works in parameterized complexity, exact exponential algorithms, and graph algorithms, and is known in particular for bidimensionality theory, the measure-and-conquer technique for analysing exponential-time algorithms, and results on kernelization. He has co-authored three books on algorithms, including the textbook Parameterized Algorithms (2015).

He is a three-time recipient of the Nerode Prize, an EATCS Fellow, and an ACM Fellow, and is an elected member of the Norwegian Academy of Science and Letters, the Norwegian Academy of Technological Sciences, and the Academia Europaea.

== Education and career ==
Fomin studied at the Faculty of Mathematics and Mechanics of Saint Petersburg State University, where he received a master's degree in 1992 and a PhD in 1997. His dissertation, Pursuit-evasion and Search Problems on Graphs, was supervised by Nikolai Nikolaevich Petrov.

He subsequently held postdoctoral positions at the University of Chile, Charles University and the Heinz Nixdorf Institut at Paderborn University. In 2002 he joined the Department of Informatics at the University of Bergen as professor of algorithms.

== Books ==
Fomin is the co-author of three books:

- Fomin, Fedor V.; Kratsch, Dieter (2010). Exact Exponential Algorithms. Springer. p. 203. ISBN 978-3-642-16532-0.
- Cygan, Marek; Fomin, Fedor V.; Kowalik, Lukasz; Lokshtanov, Daniel; Marx, Daniel; Pilipczuk, Marcin; Pilipczuk, Michal; Saurabh, Saket (2015). Parameterized Algorithms. Springer. p. 555. ISBN 978-3-319-21274-6.
- Fomin, Fedor V.; Lokshtanov, Daniel; Saurabh, Saket; Zehavi, Meirav (2019). Kernelization: Theory of Parameterized Preprocessing. Cambridge University Press. p. 528. doi:10.1017/9781107415157. ISBN 978-1107057760. S2CID 263888582.

== Awards and honours ==
Fomin received the Nerode Prize in 2015, with Erik Demaine, Mohammad Hajiaghayi and Dimitrios Thilikos for their work on bidimensionality, and again in 2017, with Fabrizio Grandoni and Dieter Kratsch, for measure and conquer. He received it a third time in 2024, with Hans L. Bodlaender, Daniel Lokshtanov, Eelko Penninkx, Saket Saurabh and Dimitrios Thilikos, for the paper "(Meta)Kernelization".

In 2019 he was named an EATCS Fellow for contributions to parameterized complexity and exponential algorithms, and in 2023 an ACM Fellow. He was elected to the Academia Europaea in 2019 and to the Norwegian Academy of Science and Letters and the Norwegian Academy of Technological Sciences in 2021.
