= Nerode Prize =

The EATCS–IPEC Nerode Prize is a theoretical computer science prize awarded for outstanding research in the area of multivariate algorithmics. It is awarded by the European Association for Theoretical Computer Science and the International Symposium on Parameterized and Exact Computation. The prize was offered for the first time in 2013, and is named in honor of mathematician Anil Nerode.

== Winners ==
The prize winners so far have been:

- 2013: Chris Calabro, Russell Impagliazzo, Valentine Kabanets, Ramamohan Paturi, and Francis Zane, for their research formulating the exponential time hypothesis and using it to determine the exact parameterized complexity of several important variants of the Boolean satisfiability problem.
- 2014: Hans L. Bodlaender, Rodney G. Downey, Michael R. Fellows, Danny Hermelin, Lance Fortnow, and Rahul Santhanam, for their work on kernelization, proving that several problems with fixed-parameter tractable algorithms do not have polynomial-size kernels unless the polynomial hierarchy collapses.
- 2015: Erik Demaine, Fedor V. Fomin, Mohammad Hajiaghayi, and Dimitrios Thilikos, for their research on bidimensionality, defining a broad framework for the design of fixed-parameter-tractable algorithms for domination and covering problems on graphs.
- 2016: Andreas Björklund for his paper Determinant Sums for Undirected Hamiltonicity, showing that methods based on algebraic graph theory lead to a significantly improved algorithm for finding Hamiltonian cycles
- 2017: Fedor V. Fomin, Fabrizio Grandoni, and Dieter Kratsch, for developing the "measure and conquer" method for the analysis of backtracking algorithms.
- 2018: Stefan Kratsch and Magnus Wahlström for their work using matroid theory to develop polynomial-size kernels for odd cycle transversal and related problems.
- 2019: Noga Alon, Raphael Yuster, and Uri Zwick, for inventing the Color-coding technique, a vastly important ingredient in the toolbox of parameterized algorithm design.
- 2020: Daniel Marx, Jianer Chen, Yang Liu, Songjian Lu, Barry O’Sullivan, Igor Razgon, for inventing the concepts of important separators and cuts which have become elegant and efficient tools used to establish the fixed parameter tractability of graph problems.
- 2021: C. S. Calude, S. Jain, B. Khoussainov, W. Li, F. Stephan, for their quasipolynomial time algorithm for deciding parity games.
- 2022: Bruno Courcelle for Courcelle's theorem on the fixed-parameter tractability of graph properties in monadic second-order logic.
- 2023: Marek Cygan, Jesper Nederlof, Marcin Pilipczuk, Michal Pilipczuk, Johan M. M. van Rooij, and Jakub Onufry Wojtaszczyk for their paper Solving Connectivity Problems Parameterized by Treewidth in Single Exponential Time.
- 2024: Hans L. Bodlaender, Fedor V. Fomin, Daniel Lokshtanov, Eelko Penninkx, Saket Saurabh, and Dimitrios M. Thilikos for their paper (Meta) Kernelization.
- 2025: Jaroslav Nešetřil, Patrice Ossona de Mendez for their papers Grad and classes with bounded expansion I. Decompositions, Grad and classes with bounded expansion II. Algorithmic aspects, First order properties on nowhere dense structures, and On nowhere dense graphs.

== See also ==
- List of computer science awards
