= Elena Prieto-Rodriguez =

Spanish and Australian mathematician, computer scientist, and mathematics educator

- Education: University of Newcastle (Ph.D. 2005); University of Victoria; Complutense University of Madrid
- Known for: Mentorship of women in STEM
- Scientific career
- Fields: Theoretical computer science; Mathematics education
- Workplaces: University of Newcastle
- Thesis: Systematic Kernelization in FPT Algorithm Design (2005)
- Doctoral advisors: Michael Fellows; Frances A. Rosamond
- Website: Home page

Elena Prieto-Rodriguez is a Spanish and Australian mathematician, computer scientist, and mathematics educator known for her research in parameterized complexity and her work in mathematics education. She is a professor in the School of Education at the University of Newcastle in Australia, and deputy head of the school for teaching and learning.

== Early life and education ==
Prieto's interest in computing was sparked by getting a personal computer as a pre-teen. After earning a bachelor's degree from the Complutense University of Madrid, Prieto worked in El Salvador from 1998 to 1999 in a mathematics education program at the University of El Salvador. After beginning graduate study in computer science in 2000 at the University of Victoria in Canada, she transferred to the University of Newcastle in Australia in 2001 and completed a doctorate in theoretical computer science in 2005. Her dissertation, Systematic Kernelization in FPT Algorithm Design, concerned methods for kernelization in parameterized algorithms, and was jointly supervised by Michael Fellows and Frances A. Rosamond.

== Work in education ==
Prieto became a postdoctoral researcher in the Newcastle Bioinformatics Initiative at Newcastle's School of Engineering and Built Environments, and then moved to the Australian Research Council as a researcher. She became interested in mathematics education out of curiosity about why young people choose careers in science, technology, engineering, and mathematics, and returned to Newcastle as a lecturer in the school of education in 2012. Since 2017, she has led a project at Newcastle named HunterWISE that links mentorship networks of women in STEM careers with schools outreach to bring younger women into STEM; the project won the University of Newcastle's Excellence Award for Equity, Diversity, and Inclusion in 2019. She is also affiliated as an external member of the Mathematics and Science Education Research Group of the University of Tasmania.
