= Catholijn Jonker =

Dutch computer scientist

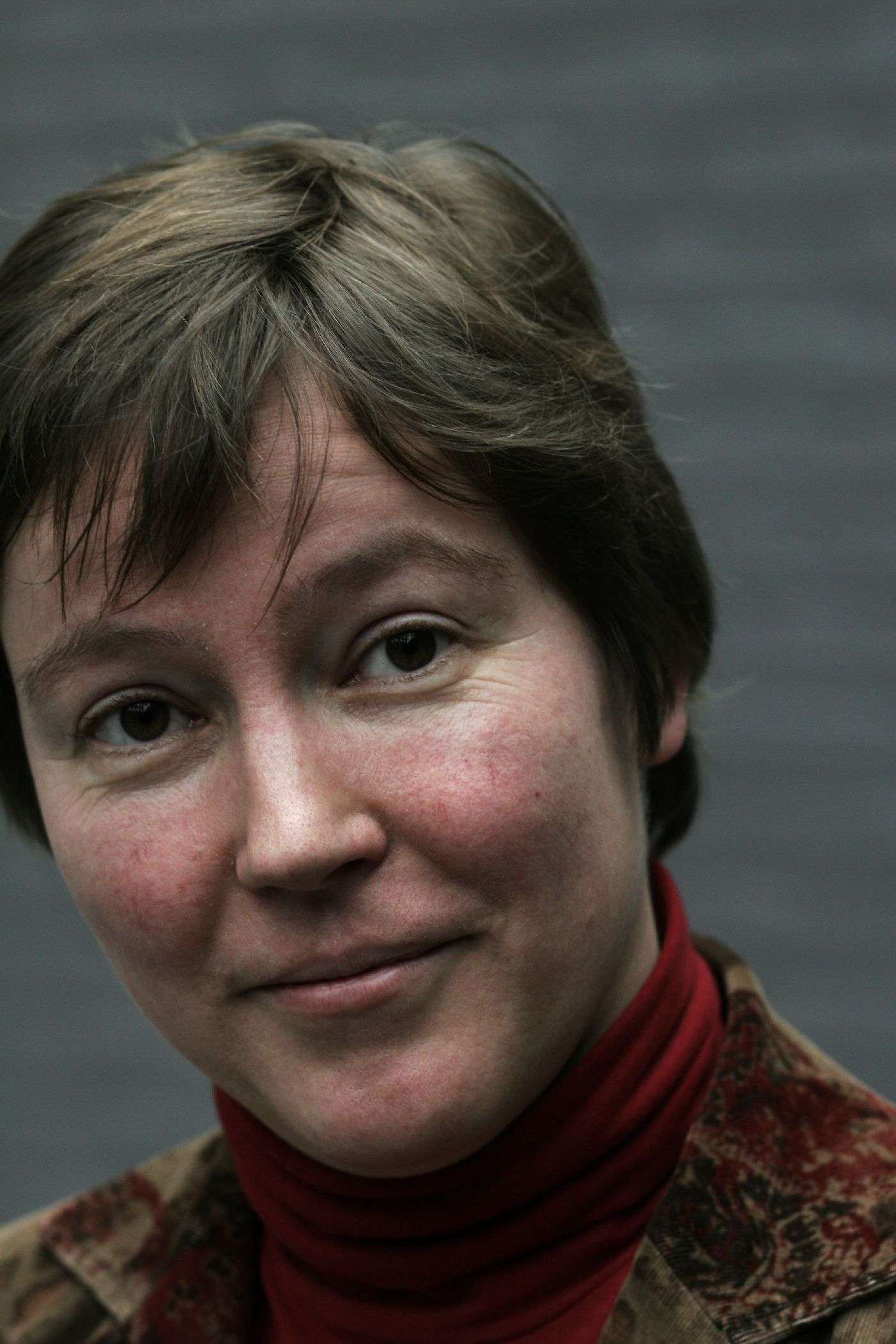
Jonker in 2005

Catholijn M. Jonker (born 1967) is a Dutch computer scientist whose research in artificial intelligence has included studies of computational trust and automated negotiation in multi-agent systems and human-agent teams, and the use of mathematical logic to formalize concepts of consciousness and emotion. She is a professor at the Delft University of Technology and Leiden University.

== Education and career ==
Jonker was born in 1967; her mother was feminist author Ineke Jonker de Putter (1934–2011). After secondary school at Ashram College, a Catholic school in Alphen aan den Rijn, Jonker studied computer science at Utrecht University, earning a master's degree in 1990. She completed a Ph.D. through Utrecht University in 1994. Her dissertation, Constraints and Negations in Logic Programming, was jointly promoted by Dirk van Dalen and Jan van Leeuwen.

After working as a researcher at Vrije Universiteit Amsterdam from 1994 to 2004, she became a professor at Radboud University Nijmegen in 2004, and then moved to the Delft University of Technology in 2006. In 2017 she added a second affiliation as a professor at Leiden University, where she is currently a part-time professor in the department of media and interaction.

She was president of the Dutch National Network of Women Professors (LNVH) from 2013 to 2016.

== Recognition ==
Jonker was the founding chair of the Young Academy of the Royal Netherlands Academy of Arts and Sciences, serving as chair from 2005 to 2006 and as a member from 2005 to 2010. She was elected to the Koninklijke Hollandsche Maatschappij der Wetenschappen in 2005, to the Academia Europaea in 2013, and as a Fellow of the European Association for Artificial Intelligence in 2015.
