= Hans L. Bodlaender =

Dutch computer scientist

Hans Leo Bodlaender (born April 21, 1960) is a Dutch computer scientist, a professor of computer science at Utrecht University. Bodlaender is known for his work on graph algorithms and parameterized complexity and in particular for algorithms relating to tree decomposition of graphs.

== Life and work ==
Born in Bennekom, Bodlaender was educated at Utrecht University, earning a doctorate in 1986 under the supervision of Jan van Leeuwen with the thesis Distributed Computing – Structure and Complexity.

After postdoctoral research at the Massachusetts Institute of Technology in 1987, he returned to Utrecht as a faculty member. In 1987 he was appointed Assistant Professor and in 2003 Associate Professor. In 2014 he became full professor of algorithms and complexity at Utrecht, and at the same time added a part-time professorship in network algorithms at Eindhoven University of Technology.

Bodlaender has written extensively about chess variants and founded the website The Chess Variant Pages in 1995.

== Recognition ==
In 2014 he was awarded the Nerode Prize for an outstanding paper in the area of multivariate algorithmics, for his work with Rod Downey, Michael Fellows, and Danny Hermelin on kernelization.

A festschrift, Treewidth, Kernels, and Algorithms: Essays Dedicated to Hans L. Bodlaender on the Occasion of His 60th Birthday, was published in 2020.

== Selected publications ==
- Bodlaender, Hans L. (1996), "A linear-time algorithm for finding tree-decompositions of small treewidth", SIAM Journal on Computing, 25 (6): 1305–1317, doi:10.1137/S0097539793251219, hdl:1874/16670, MR 1417901
- Bodlaender, Hans L. (1998), "A partial $k$-arboretum of graphs with bounded treewidth", Theoretical Computer Science, 209 (1–2): 1–45, doi:10.1016/S0304-3975(97)00228-4, hdl:1874/18312, MR 1647486
- Bodlaender, Hans L.; Downey, Rodney G.; Fellows, Michael R.; Hermelin, Danny (2009), "On problems without polynomial kernels", Journal of Computer and System Sciences, 75 (8): 423–434, doi:10.1016/j.jcss.2009.04.001, MR 2568366
