= Rod Downey =

Australian mathematician

Rod Downey FRSNZ, FNZMS, FACM
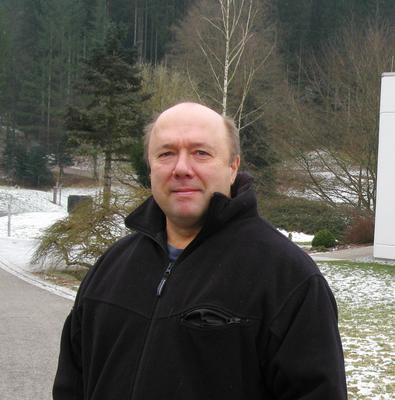
- Born: 20 September 1957 (age 69)
- Occupations: Professor of Mathematics, Victoria University of Wellington
- Known for: Computability theory, incl. parameterised complexity
- Awards: RSNZ Hector Medal, Rutherford Medal, James Cook Research Fellowship

Academic background
- Education: Monash (PhD 1982); Queensland (BSc 1978)
- Doctoral advisor: John Crossley
- Website: Here

Rodney Graham Downey (born 20 September 1957) is a New Zealand and Australian mathematician and computer scientist, an emeritus professor in the School of Mathematics and Statistics at Victoria University of Wellington in New Zealand. He is known for his work in mathematical logic and computational complexity theory, and in particular for founding the field of parameterised complexity together with Michael Fellows.

== Biography ==
Downey graduated from Brisbane State High School in 1974, and earned a bachelor's degree with first class honours at the University of Queensland in 1978, and then went on to graduate school at Monash University, earning a doctorate in 1982 under the supervision of John Crossley. After holding teaching and visiting positions at the Chisholm Institute of Technology, Western Illinois University, the National University of Singapore, and the University of Illinois at Urbana-Champaign, he came to New Zealand in 1986 as a lecturer at Victoria University. He was promoted to reader in 1991, was given a personal chair at Victoria in 1995, and retired in 2023.

Downey was president of the New Zealand Mathematical Society from 2001 to 2003.

== Publications ==
Downey is the co-author of seven books:

- Parameterized Complexity (with Michael Fellows, Springer, 1999)
- Algorithmic Randomness and Complexity (with D. Hirschfeldt, Springer, 2010)
- Fundamentals of Parameterized Complexity (with Michael Fellows, Springer, 2013)
- Minimal Weak Truth Table Degrees and Computably Enumerable Turing Degrees (with Keng Meng Ng and David Reed Solomon, Memoirs American Mathematical Society, Vol. 2184, 2020)
- A Hierarchy of Turing Degrees (with Noam Greenberg, Annals of Mathematics Studies No. 206, Princeton University Press, 2020)
- Computability and Complexity: Foundations and Tools for Pursuing Scientific Applications, (Springer-Verlag Texts in Computer Science, 2024)
- Computable Structure Theory: A Unified Approach, (Springer-Verlag Theory and Applications of Computability, 2025)

Downey has edited or co-edited nine books including Turing's Legacy which was an ACM Computing Reviews notable book for 2014. He is also the author or co-author of around 300 research papers, including a highly cited sequence of four papers with Michael Fellows and Karl Abrahamson setting the foundation for the study of parameterised complexity.

== Awards and honours ==
In 1990, Downey won the Hamilton Research Award from the Royal Society of New Zealand. In 1992, Downey won the Research Award of the New Zealand Mathematical Society "for penetrating and prolific investigations that have made him a leading expert in many aspects of recursion theory, effective algebra and complexity".

In 1994, he won the New Zealand Association of Scientists Research Award, and became a fellow of the Royal Society of New Zealand in 1996. In 2006, he became the first New Zealand-based mathematician to give an Invited Lecture at the International Congress of Mathematicians.

He has also given invited lectures at the International Congress of Logic, Methodology and Philosophy of Science and the ACM Conference on Computational Complexity. He was elected as an ACM Fellow in 2007 "for contributions to computability and complexity theory", becoming the second ACM Fellow in New Zealand, and in the same year was elected as a fellow of the New Zealand Mathematical Society. Also in 2007 he was awarded a James Cook Research Fellowship for research on the nature of computation.

In 2010 he won the Shoenfield Prize (for articles) of the Association for Symbolic Logic for his work with Denis Hirschfeldt, Andre Nies, and Sebastiaan Terwijn on randomness. In 2011, the Royal Society of New Zealand gave him their Hector Medal "for his outstanding, internationally acclaimed work in recursion theory, computational complexity, and other aspects of mathematical logic and combinatorics." In 2012, he became a fellow of the American Mathematical Society. In 2013, he became a Fellow of the Australian Mathematical Society.

In 2014, he was awarded the Nerode Prize from the European Association for Theoretical Computer Science, jointly with Hans Bodlaender, Michael Fellows, Danny Hermelin, Lance Fortnow and Rahul Santhanam for their work on kernelization lower bounds. In October 2016, Downey received a distinguished Humboldt Research Award for his academic contributions. With Denis Hirschfeldt, Downey won another Shoenfield Prize from the Association for Symbolic Logic, this time the 2016 book prize for Algorithmic Randomness and Complexity. In 2018, Downey delivered the Gödel Lecture of the Association for Symbolic Logic, titled Algorithmic randomness, at the European Summer Meeting at Udine, Italy. The same year, Downey was awarded the Rutherford Medal, the highest honour awarded by the Royal Society of New Zealand, "for his pre-eminent revolutionary research into computability, including development of the theory of parameterised complexity and the algorithmic study of randomness."

In 2022, Downey was awarded the New Zealand Association of von Humboldt Fellows Research Award for research over the preceding five years.

In 2023, Downey was awarded the S. Barry Cooper Prize from the Association for Computability in Europe. This award is awarded every two to three years "to a researcher who has contributed to a broad understanding and foundational study of computability by outstanding results, by seminal and lasting theory building, by exceptional service to the research communities involved, or by a combination of these."

In 2024, Downey was awarded the New Zealand Mathematics Society Kalman Prize "for a single publication of original research, which may be an article, monograph or book, having appeared within the last 5 calendar years: 2019-2024". This publication was the monograph "A Hierarchy of Turing Degrees" published in the Annals of Mathematics Studies, jointly written with Noam Greenberg.

In 2026, Downey received the Jones Medal from the Royal Society Te Apārangi, in recognition of his research into the limits of computation and his research leadership.

== Scottish Country Dancing ==
Downey is a well-known deviser of Scottish Country Dances having devised over 150 dances and several novel formations such as The Rose Progression, and the Hello-Goodbye Poussette, both adopted by the Royal Scottish Country Dance Society.
