= Fold-and-cut theorem =

Any shape with straight sides can be cut from a single sheet of folded paper with one cut

Creating a Koch snowflake curve by the fold-and-cut method

The fold-and-cut theorem states that any shape with straight sides can be cut from a single (idealized) sheet of paper by folding it flat and making a single straight complete cut. Such shapes include polygons, which may be concave, shapes with holes, and collections of such shapes (i.e. the regions need not be connected).

The corresponding problem that the theorem solves is known as the fold-and-cut problem, which asks what shapes can be obtained by the so-called fold-and-cut method. A particular instance of the problem, which asks how a particular shape can be obtained by the fold-and-cut method, is known as a fold-and-cut problem.

== History ==
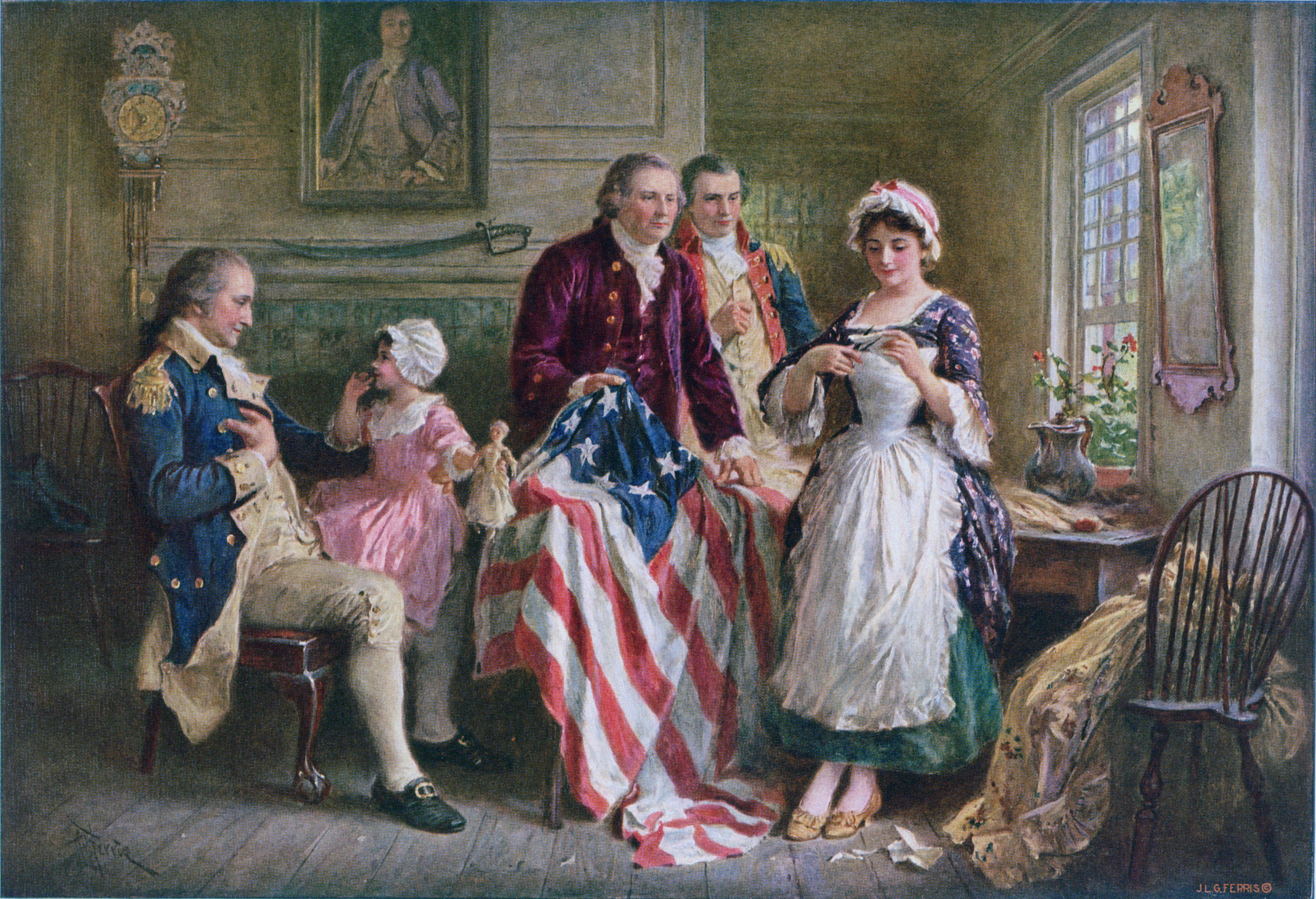
Detail from Jean Leon Gerome Ferris's Betsy Ross 1777 depicting Ross cutting a star

The earliest known description of a fold-and-cut problem appears in Wakoku Chiyekurabe (Mathematical Contests), a book that was published in 1721 by Kan Chu Sen in Japan.

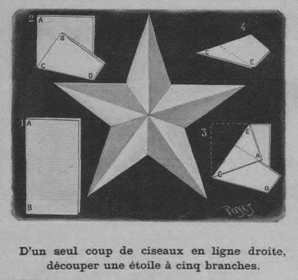
A method to fold a sheet of paper to make a regular pentagram with a single cut

An 1873 article in Harper's New Monthly Magazine describes how Betsy Ross may have proposed that stars on the American flag have five points, because such a shape can easily be obtained by the fold-and-cut method.

In the 20th century, several magicians published books containing examples of fold-and-cut problems, including Will Blyth, Harry Houdini, and Gerald Loe (1955).

Inspired by Loe, Martin Gardner wrote about the fold-and-cut problems in Scientific American in 1960. Examples mentioned by Gardner include separating the red squares from the black squares of a checkerboard with one cut, and "an old paper-cutting stunt, of unknown origin" in which one cut splits a piece of paper into both a Latin cross and a set of smaller pieces that can be rearranged to spell the word "hell". Foreshadowing work on the general fold-and-cut theorem, he writes that "more complicated designs present formidable problems".

The first proof of the fold-and-cut theorem, solving the problem, was published in 1999 by Erik Demaine, Martin Demaine, and Anna Lubiw and was solved using the straight skeleton method.

Creating an anti-Koch snowflake curve by the fold-and-cut method

== Solutions ==
There are two general methods known for solving instances of the fold-and-cut problem, based on straight skeletons and on circle packing respectively.
