= Algorithmic paradigm =

Technique or strategy underlying a variety of algorithms

An algorithmic paradigm or algorithm design paradigm is a generic model or framework which underlies the design of a class of algorithms. An algorithmic paradigm is an abstraction higher than the notion of an algorithm, just as an algorithm is an abstraction higher than a computer program.

== List of well-known paradigms ==
=== General ===
- Backtracking
- Branch and bound
- Brute-force search
- Divide and conquer
- Dynamic programming
- Greedy algorithm
- Recursion
- Prune and search

=== Parameterized complexity ===
- Kernelization
- Iterative compression

=== Computational geometry ===
- Sweep line algorithms
- Rotating calipers
- Randomized incremental construction
