= Mike Fellows =

Mike Fellows may refer to:

- Mike Fellows (musician) (born 1959), American musician
- Mike Fellows (politician) (1957–2016), politician with the Montana Libertarian Party

== See also ==
- Michael Fellows, American computer scientist
