= Frances A. Rosamond =

Australian computer scientist

- Rosamond in 2026
- Born: Frances Ann Novak; 1943 (age 82–83)
- Education: Cornell University
- Awards: University of Newcastle HEEP Equity Award for her investigation into increasing the number of women in computer science
- Scientific career
- Fields: computer education, parameterized complexity, computer games
- Workplaces: University of Newcastle, National University in San Diego
- Thesis: (1981)
- Doctoral advisor: David Henderson

Frances Ann Novak Rosamond (born 1943) is an Australian computer scientist whose research interests include computer education and parameterized complexity. She is the editor of the Parameterized Complexity Newsletter, moderator of the parameterized complexity wiki, and publicity chair of the International Symposium on Parameterized and Exact Computation.

Rosamond obtained a PhD from Cornell University in 1981; her thesis work, supervised by David Henderson, involved developing the Cornell Mathematics Support Center, which continues to be active. While at Cornell, she also developed a program to assist adult women overcome mathematics anxiety and progress along the “Scheme of Intellectual and Ethical Development” created by William G. Perry. Rosamond’s research in education also includes computer games, including methodology for systematically generating game puzzles utilizing NP-completeness. At the University of Newcastle, Australia, Rosamond developed a new program of computer games, and a guest-visitor seminar series. Since 1998, Rosamond and her husband Michael Fellows have provided workshops on the mathematical foundations of computer science to children and adults in many countries. Rosamond orchestrated Sonia Kovalevskia Mathematics Days for girls and their teachers when she was professor of mathematics at National University in San Diego (1986-2000), and was a promoter of the San Diego Science Alliance. She received a University of Newcastle HEEP Equity Award for her investigation into increasing the number of women in computer science.

Rosamond has served on the Mathematics Association of America Committee on Mathematics and the Environment, Committee on Under-represented Minorities and Committee on the Teaching of Undergraduate Mathematics and, chaired the Task Force on Data Collection and Policy Issues. She was the representative to the JOINT-AMS-AWM-ASA-IMS-MAA-NCTM-SIAM Committee on Women in the Mathematical Sciences. Together with Sue Geller and Patricia Kenschaft, Frances developed and acted in the MAA Skit Program, a humorous presentation of recent discrimination events with disguised identities. Rosamond helped arrange for the Mathematical Association of America to be an official non-governmental organization of The United Nations Fourth World Conference on Women and to present workshops at the conference. Rosamond has served the mathematics education community as one of the original members of the Association for Women in Mathematics. She was an invited delegate to the first Women and Mathematics delegation to the People’s Republic of China in 1991. She has served on the board of directors of the Women in Mathematics Education Association, and as a member of the Nominations and Elections committee. She has been active in the American Educational Research Association, Greater San Diego Mathematics Council, and California Mathematics Council.
