= Connected dominating set =

Dominating set that induces a connected subgraph

A graph with a minimum connected dominating set highlighted red

In graph theory, a connected dominating set and a maximum leaf spanning tree are two closely related structures defined on an undirected graph.

== Definitions ==
A connected dominating set of a graph G is a set D of vertices with two properties:

1. Any vertex in D can reach any other vertex in D by a path that stays entirely within D. That is, D induces a connected subgraph of G.
2. Every vertex in G either belongs to D or is adjacent to a vertex in D. That is, D is a dominating set of G.

A minimum connected dominating set of a graph G is a connected dominating set with the smallest possible cardinality among all connected dominating sets of G. The connected domination number of G is the number of vertices in the minimum connected dominating set.

Any spanning tree T of a graph G has at least two leaves, vertices that have only one edge of T incident to them. A maximum leaf spanning tree is a spanning tree that has the largest possible number of leaves among all spanning trees of G. The max leaf number of G is the number of leaves in the maximum leaf spanning tree.

== Complementarity ==
If d is the connected domination number of an n-vertex graph G, where n > 2, and l is its max leaf number, then the three quantities d, l, and n obey the simple equation

$\displaystyle n = d + l.$

If D is a connected dominating set, then there exists a spanning tree in G whose leaves include all vertices that are not in D: form a spanning tree of the subgraph induced by D, together with edges connecting each remaining vertex v that is not in D to a neighbor of v in D. This shows that l ≥ n − d.

In the other direction, if T is any spanning tree in G, then the vertices of T that are not leaves form a connected dominating set of G. This shows that n − l ≥ d. Putting these two inequalities together proves the equality n = d + l.

Therefore, in any graph, the sum of the connected domination number and the max leaf number equals the total number of vertices. Computationally, this implies that determining the connected domination number is equally difficult as finding the max leaf number.

== Algorithms ==
It is NP-complete to test whether there exists a connected dominating set with size less than a given threshold, or equivalently to test whether there exists a spanning tree with at least a given number of leaves. Therefore, it is believed that the minimum connected dominating set problem and the maximum leaf spanning tree problem cannot be solved in polynomial time.

When viewed in terms of approximation algorithms, connected domination and maximum leaf spanning trees are not the same: approximating one to within a given approximation ratio is not the same as approximating the other to the same ratio. There exists an approximation for the minimum connected dominating set that achieves a factor of 2 ln Δ + O(1), where Δ is the maximum degree of a vertex in G. The maximum leaf spanning tree problem is MAX-SNP hard, implying that no polynomial time approximation scheme is likely. However, it can be approximated to within a factor of 2 in polynomial time.

Both problems may be solved, on n-vertex graphs, in time O(1.9^{n}). The maximum leaf problem is fixed-parameter tractable, meaning that it can be solved in time exponential in the number of leaves but only polynomial in the input graph size. The klam value of these algorithms (intuitively, a number of leaves up to which the problem can be solved within a reasonable amount of time) has gradually increased, as algorithms for the problem have improved, to approximately 37, and it has been suggested that at least 50 should be achievable.

In graphs of maximum degree three, the connected dominating set and its complementary maximum leaf spanning tree problem can be solved in polynomial time, by transforming them into an instance of the matroid parity problem for linear matroids.

== Applications ==
Connected dominating sets are useful in the computation of routing for mobile ad hoc networks. In this application, a small connected dominating set is used as a backbone for communications, and nodes that are not in this set communicate by passing messages through neighbors that are in the set.

The max leaf number has been employed in the development of fixed-parameter tractable algorithms: several NP-hard optimization problems may be solved in polynomial time for graphs of bounded max leaf number.

== See also ==
- Universal vertex, a vertex that (when it exists) gives a minimum connected dominating set of size one
