= Jan van Leeuwen (computer scientist) =

Dutch computer scientist

- Born: 17 December 1946 (age 79); Waddinxveen, Netherlands
- Education: Utrecht University
- Scientific career
- Fields: Computer Science
- Workplaces: Utrecht University
- Thesis: Rule-Labeled Programs: A Study of a Generalization of Context-Free Grammars and Some Classes of Formal Languages (1972)
- Doctoral advisor: Dirk van Dalen
- Doctoral students: Hans Bodlaender, Catholijn Jonker, Mark Overmars

Jan van Leeuwen (born 17 December 1946 in Waddinxveen) is a Dutch computer scientist and emeritus professor of computer science at the Department of Information and Computing Sciences at Utrecht University.

== Education and career ==
Van Leeuwen completed his undergraduate studies in mathematics at Utrecht University in 1967 and received a PhD in mathematics in 1972 from the same institution under the supervision of Dirk van Dalen. After postdoctoral studies at the University of California, Berkeley and faculty positions at SUNY at Buffalo and the Pennsylvania State University, he returned to Utrecht as a faculty member in 1977. He was head of his department from 1977 to 1983, and again from 1991 to 1994, and dean from 1994 to 2009. Jan van Leeuwen was one of the founders of Informatics Europe.

== Research ==
Jan van Leeuwen contributed to many fields of theoretical computer science, notably to algorithm design and computational complexity theory, and to the philosophy of computing. Among his doctoral students are algorithms researcher and Utrecht faculty member Hans Bodlaender and notable game software developer and former fellow Utrecht faculty member, Mark Overmars. Van Leeuwen is well known as a former series editor of the Lecture Notes in Computer Science.

== Awards and honors ==
Van Leeuwen is a member of the Royal Dutch Society of Sciences and Humanities since 1992, and in 2006 he was elected to the Academia Europaea. In 2008 he received an honorary doctorate from the RWTH Aachen. In 2013 he received the ACM Distinguished Service Award, together with Gerhard Goos and Juris Hartmanis.

== Books ==
Jan van Leeuwen was the editor of the two-volume Handbook of Theoretical Computer Science. In 2013, he and S. Barry Cooper published Alan Turing: His Work and Impact (Elsevier, ISBN 978-0-12-386980-7), a special edition of the collected works of Alan Turing. This book won the R.R. Hawkins Award 2013.

== Family ==
His son, Erik Jan van Leeuwen, is also an academic computer scientist. He was a senior researcher at the Max-Planck-Institut für Informatik, and currently is an associate professor in the Department of Information and Computing Sciences at Utrecht University.
