= Mohammad Hajiaghayi =

Computer scientist

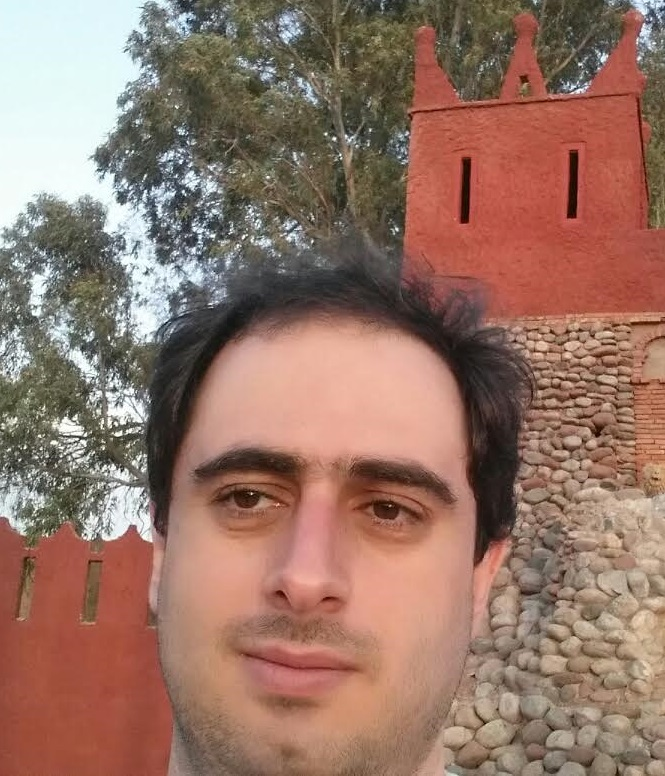
- Born: Persian: محمد تقی‌ حاجی آقائی
- Education: Massachusetts Institute of Technology (PhD)
- Awards: Guggenheim Fellowship (2019); Blavatnik National Awards for Young Scientists (2020); EATCS Fellow (2020); IEEE Fellow (2019); ACM Fellow (2018); EATCS Nerode Prize (2015)
- Scientific career
- Fields: Computer science
- Workplaces: University of Maryland, College Park
- Doctoral advisor: Erik Demaine; F. Thomson Leighton
- Website: www.cs.umd.edu/~hajiagha

Mohammad Taghi Hajiaghayi (Persian: محمد تقی‌ حاجی آقائی) is a computer scientist known for his work in algorithms, game theory, social networks, network design, graph theory, and big data. He has over 200 publications with over 185 collaborators and 10 issued patents.

He is the Jack and Rita G. Minker Professor at the University of Maryland Department of Computer Science.

== Professional career ==
Hajiaghayi received his PhD in applied mathematics and computer science from Massachusetts Institute of Technology in 2005 advised by Erik Demaine and F. Thomson Leighton. His thesis was The Bidimensionality Theory and Its Algorithmic Applications. It founded the theory of bidimensionality which later received the Nerode Prize and was the topic of workshops.

Hajiaghayi has been the coach of the University of Maryland ACM International Collegiate Programming team in the World Finals.

== Honors and awards ==
Hajiaghayi's has received National Science Foundation CAREER Award (2010), Office of Naval Research Young Investigator Award (2011), University of Maryland Graduate Faculty Mentor of the Year Award (2015), as well as Google Faculty Research Awards (2010 & 2014). So far Hajiaghayi has raised more than $4 million in terms of grant award money from government and industry since joining the University of Maryland.

With his co-authors Erik Demaine, Fedor Fomin, and Dimitrios Thilikos, he received the 2015 European Association for Theoretical Computer Science Nerode Prize for his work (also the topic of his Ph.D. thesis) on bidimensionality, a general technique for developing both fixed-parameter tractable exact algorithms and approximation algorithms for a wide class of algorithmic problems on graphs.

Hajiaghayi has been elected as an ACM Fellow in 2018 "for contributions to the fields of algorithmic graph theory and algorithmic game theory." Hajiaghayi has been elected as an IEEE Fellow in 2019 "for contributions to algorithmic graph theory and to algorithmic game theory." Hajiaghayi has been elected as an EATCS Fellow in 2020 "his contributions to the theory of algorithms, in particular algorithmic graph theory, game theory, and distributed computing."

In 2019, Hajiaghayi was awarded a fellowship by the John Simon Guggenheim Memorial Foundation. In 2020, he was selected as an honoree of Blavatnik Awards for Young Scientists.
