= Saket Saurabh =

Indian computer scientist

Saket Saurabh is an Indian computer scientist who is currently the Professor of Theoretical Computer Science at the Institute of Mathematical Sciences, Chennai (IMSc), India and an adjunct faculty at University of Bergen, Norway. He specializes in parameterized complexity, exact algorithms, graph algorithms and game theory. His fundamental contributions to the area of parameterized complexity include procedures for obtaining algorithmic lower bounds, and meta-theorems on preprocessing. Saket Saurabh was awarded the Shanti Swarup Bhatnagar Prize for Science and Technology in Mathematical Sciences in the year 2021.

== Early life and education ==
Saurabh was born on 23 July 1980. He hails from Hajipur district in Bihar. After initial schooling in Bihar at Kendriya Vidyalaya Sonepur, till class 9. He moved out. He obtained BSc (Honours) in mathematics and MSc in computer science from Chennai Mathematical Institute, Chennai. He also secured a PhD in theoretical computer science from IMSc in 2008. Before joining IMSc as a faculty member, Saket Saurabh had worked as a research assistant at University of Bergen during September 2006 to May 2007 and as a postdoctoral fellow at the same university during September 2007 to Sep 2009.

== Awards and recognitions ==
- 2020: ACM India Early Career Researcher (ECR) Award
- 2020: Member, Academia Eurpoaea
- 2020: Fellow, Indian Academy of Sciences
- 2022: Asian Scientist 100, Asian Scientist
- 2022: ACM Distinguished Member
