= Erik Demaine =

Computer scientist (b. 1981)

Erik D. Demaine
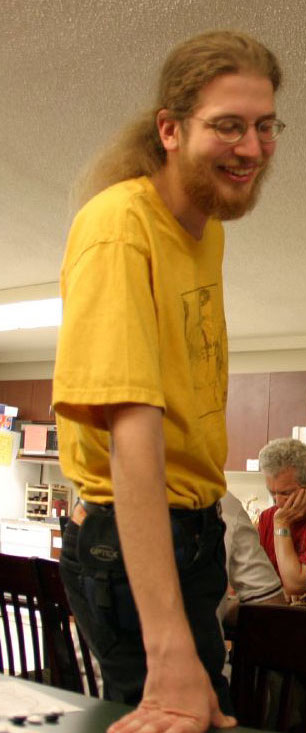
- Demaine in 2005
- Born: February 28, 1981 (age 45); Halifax, Nova Scotia, Canada
- Education: Dalhousie University; University of Waterloo
- Awards: MacArthur Fellow (2003); Nerode Prize (2015); ACM Fellow (2016)
- Scientific career
- Workplaces: Massachusetts Institute of Technology
- Thesis: Folding and Unfolding (2001)
- Doctoral advisor: Anna Lubiw; Ian Munro
- Doctoral students: Bob Hearn; Jelani Nelson; Mohammad Hajiaghayi; Nicole Immorlica; Mihai Pătrașcu

Erik D. Demaine (born February 28, 1981) is a Canadian-American professor of computer science at the Massachusetts Institute of Technology and a child prodigy.

== Early life and education ==
Demaine was born in Halifax, Nova Scotia, to mathematician and sculptor Martin L. Demaine and Judy Anderson. From the age of 7, he was identified as a child prodigy and spent time traveling across North America with his father. He was home-schooled during that time span until entering university at the age of 12.

Demaine completed his bachelor's degree at 14 years of age at Dalhousie University in Canada, and completed his PhD at the University of Waterloo by the time he was 20 years old. Demaine's PhD dissertation, a work in the field of computational origami, was completed at the University of Waterloo under the supervision of Anna Lubiw and Ian Munro. This work was awarded the Canadian Governor General's Gold Medal from the University of Waterloo and the NSERC Doctoral Prize (2003) for the best PhD thesis and research in Canada. Some of the work from this thesis was later incorporated into his book Geometric Folding Algorithms on the mathematics of paper folding published with Joseph O'Rourke in 2007.

== Professional accomplishments ==
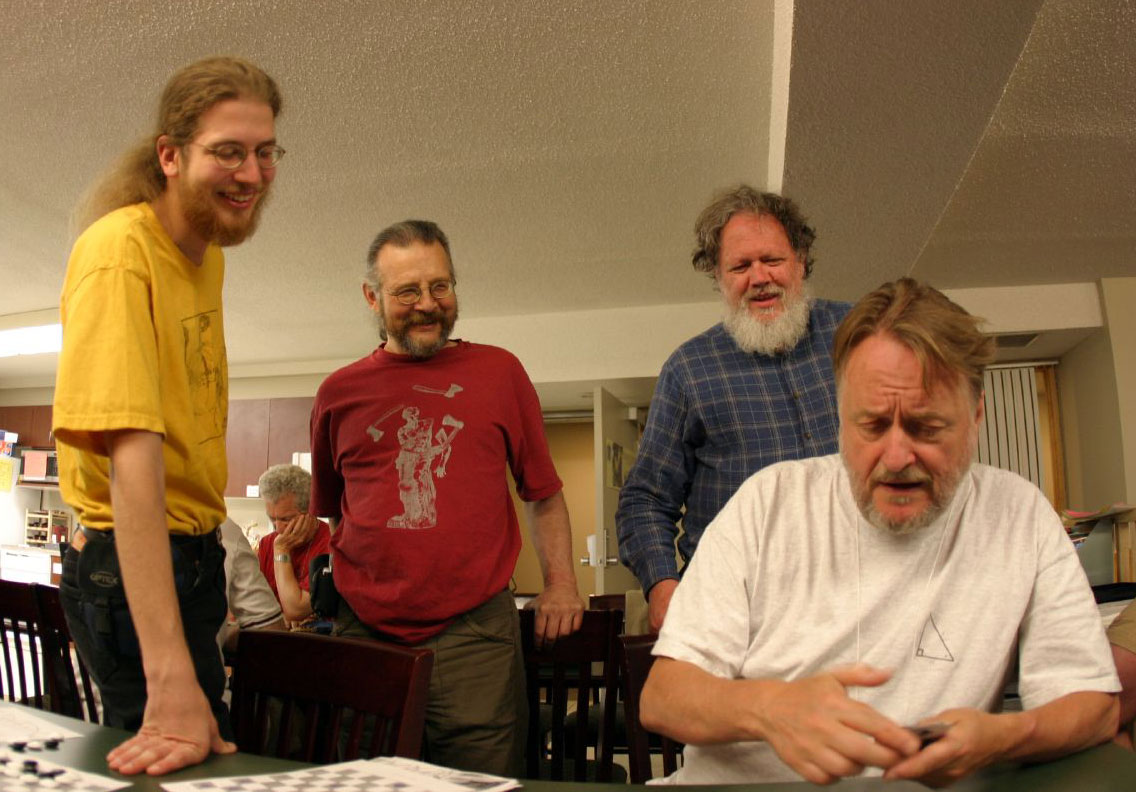
Erik Demaine (left), Martin Demaine (center), and Bill Spight (right) watch John Horton Conway demonstrate a card trick (June 2005)

Demaine joined the faculty of the Massachusetts Institute of Technology (MIT) in 2001 at age 20, reportedly the youngest professor in the history of MIT, and was promoted to full professorship in 2011. Demaine is a member of the Theory of Computation group at MIT Computer Science and Artificial Intelligence Laboratory.

Mathematical origami artwork by Erik and Martin Demaine was part of the Design and the Elastic Mind exhibit at the Museum of Modern Art in 2008, and has been included in the MoMA permanent collection. That same year, he was one of the featured artists in Between the Folds, an international documentary film about origami practitioners which was later broadcast on PBS television. In connection with a 2012 exhibit, three of his curved origami artworks with Martin Demaine are in the permanent collection of the Renwick Gallery of the Smithsonian Museum.

Demaine was a fan of Martin Gardner and in 2001 he teamed up with his father Martin Demaine and Gathering 4 Gardner founder Tom M. Rodgers to edit a tribute book for Gardner on his 90th birthday. From 2016 to 2020 he was president of the board of directors of Gathering 4 Gardner.

== Honours and awards ==
In 2003, Demaine was awarded the MacArthur Fellowship, known colloquially as the "genius grant".

In 2013, Demaine received the EATCS Presburger Award for young scientists. The award citation listed accomplishments including his work on the carpenter's rule problem, hinged dissection, prefix sum data structures, competitive analysis of binary search trees, graph minors, and computational origami. That same year, he was awarded a fellowship by the John Simon Guggenheim Memorial Foundation.

For his work on bidimensionality, he was the winner of the Nerode Prize in 2015 along with his co-authors Fedor Fomin, Mohammad T. Hajiaghayi, and Dimitrios Thilikos. The work was the study of a general technique for developing both fixed-parameter tractable exact algorithms and approximation algorithms for a class of algorithmic problems on graphs.

In 2016, he became a fellow at the Association for Computing Machinery. He was given an honorary doctorate by Bard College in 2017.

== See also ==
- List of University of Waterloo people
