= Sue Geller =

American mathematician

Susan Carol Geller
- Education: Ph.D., Cornell University, 1975; B.S., Case Institute of Technology, 1970
- Known for: Algebraic K-theory; Cyclic homology Biostatistics; Mathematics Education
- Scientific career
- Fields: Mathematics
- Workplaces: Texas A&M University

Sue Geller is an American mathematician and a professor emerita of mathematics at the department of mathematics at Texas A&M University. She is noted for her research background in algebraic K-theory, as well as her interdisciplinary work in bioinformatics and biostatistics, among other disciplines.

== Research ==
Sue Geller has an extensive and largely interdisciplinary research background with a variety of focus areas, including bioinformatics, biostatistics, computational biology, algebraic K-theory, cyclic homology, and mathematics education. Throughout her career as a mathematician, Geller has published over thirty research publications, earning her notability as an accomplished interdisciplinary researcher.

Geller's research in the fields of algebraic K-theory, cyclic homology, and Hochschild homology focuses on determining the relationships between K-theory and homology theories and exploiting these relationships to provide algorithms for computing K-theory and cyclic homology. Her algebraic research has been published in a variety of academic journals, as well as presented at the 1983 Summer Research Conference held by the American Mathematical Society (AMS).

Her foray into the fields of bioinformatics and biostatistics has led her to research methods of addressing challenges faced when analyzing data produced by microarray technology, which provides ways of studying active genes in different cell tissue types. Primarily, Geller investigates methods of analyzing relatively small samples using new statistical methods.

Though she has not published any formal research in mathematics education, Geller developed a keen interest in the subject in 2000 and has since served as a doctoral advisor for two students with a mathematics education specialty. She also began conducting research on the information available from college applications and how it correlates to success in university honors programs for freshman students. Within this, she is researching the correlation of the Math Placement Exam incoming college students take and their success in their recommended math class with a goal to improve advising.

== Education ==
Sue Geller obtained her B.S. in mathematics from the Case Institute of Technology in 1970. Upon graduation she continued her education at Cornell University, where she earned her M.S. in mathematics in 1972, followed by her Ph.D. in mathematics from the same institution in 1975.

Studying under advisor and Cornell faculty member Stephen Chase, the primary focus of Geller's graduate research was in algebraic K-theory, as reflected in the title of her doctoral dissertation, On the GE(sub n) of a Ring and Some New Algebraic K-Groups. She also worked as a teaching assistant and lecturer for Cornell during her graduate studies. Geller was one of twenty-one women awarded a doctorate in mathematics at Cornell University during the years 1868 to 1939, in which one hundred doctorates total were awarded by the Cornell Department of Mathematics.

== Career ==
Most recently, Sue Geller held three positions at Texas A&M University in College Station, Texas, including professor of mathematics, professor of veterinary integrative biosciences, and director of honors programs in mathematics. Some of the courses Geller primarily taught include a Survey of Mathematical Problems, History of Mathematics, Seminar in Algebra, and independent study courses in various algebraic topics.

Upon completion of her education at Cornell University, Geller worked for six years as an assistant professor at Purdue University before transitioning to a Faculty Fellow position at Harvard University. With the exception of an interim year as an associate research professor at Rutgers in 1987–1988, Geller joined the faculty at Texas A&M University in 1981 as an associate professor, where she worked for over thirty years in a total of five different faculty positions before her retirement. She also worked as a research biostatistician at the University of California at Davis in 2001–2002.

In addition to her career as professor of mathematics at Texas A&M University, Geller founded the first department-level honors program at the university and served as the Director of Honors in Mathematics for several years. In her time at Texas A&M, she has supervised over 100 masters students and mentored many undergraduates. Due to her deep interest in and commitment to mentoring students, the Department of Mathematics renamed its Mathematics Undergraduate Research Lecture Series in 2018 to the Sue Geller Undergraduate Lecture Series, honoring Geller's dedication and service.

Geller is a strong advocate for women in mathematics and served on the Mathematical Association of America's Committee on the Participation of Women January 1990 through July 1994. Her major contribution was a compilation of skits that highlighted micro-inequities that women face in their mathematical careers. She consistently made efforts to utilize humor to combat these inequities and work towards women's equality in mathematics.

Geller has also been very active in the activities of the Association for Women in Mathematics (AWM). She was elected as an At Large Member of the executive committee and served from 1989 - 1991. She again was on the executive committee as Clerk in 1999 - 2001.

== Honors and awards ==
In 2015, Geller was recognized with the 2015 Distinguished Achievement Award in Student Relations by The Association of Former Students at Texas A&M, cited to have had a "transformative effect on the pedagogical mission of the Department of Mathematics" at the university.

One year prior, Geller was selected by the Texas A&M Women's Faculty Network as the recipient of the 2013 Outstanding Mentoring Award for her efforts to guide and support junior faculty members at Texas A&M, and in 2012, she received the Director's Award for Outstanding Service to Honors Programs from Texas A&M's office of Undergraduate Studies.

Geller is also a three-time winner of the Texas A&M Department of Mathematics Outstanding Teaching Award.

Geller was elected to the 2023 class of fellows of the Association for Women in Mathematics "for her extensive and effective support of women in mathematics through research, publications, teaching, outreach and mentoring; for addressing microaggressions via both public awareness and private mentoring; and for her long record of leadership and service related to women in mathematics in professional societies."
