= Automated negotiation =

Automated negotiation is a form of interaction in systems that are composed of multiple autonomous agents, in which the aim is to reach agreements through an iterative process of making offers.

Automated negotiation can be employed for many tasks human negotiators regularly engage in, such as bargaining and joint decision making. The main topics in automated negotiation revolve around the design of protocols and negotiating strategies.

== History ==
Through digitization, the beginning of the 21st century has seen a growing interest in the automation of negotiation and e-negotiation systems, for example in the setting of e-commerce. This interest is fueled by the promise of automated agents being able to negotiate on behalf of human negotiators, and to find better outcomes than human negotiators.

== Examples ==
Examples of automated negotiation include:

- Online dispute resolution, in which disagreements between parties are settled.
- Sponsored search auction, where bids are placed on advertisement keywords.
- Content negotiation, in which user agents negotiate over HTTP about how to best represent a web resource.
- Negotiation support systems, in which negotiation decision-making activities are supported by an information system.
