= Ashram College =

Location
- Marsdiep 289, Alphen aan den Rijn; Lindelaan 2, Nieuwkoop; Netherlands
- Coordinates: 52.146367°N 4.65337°E

Information
- Type: Catholic school
- Motto: Home in the world
- Established: 1929
- Website: ashram.nl

The Ashram College is a Dutch high school located in Alphen aan den Rijn and Nieuwkoop. It was established in 1929. The school offers VWO excluding or including the classical languages Latin and Greek, HAVO and VMBO-T. Ashram College is a Catholic school.

== History ==
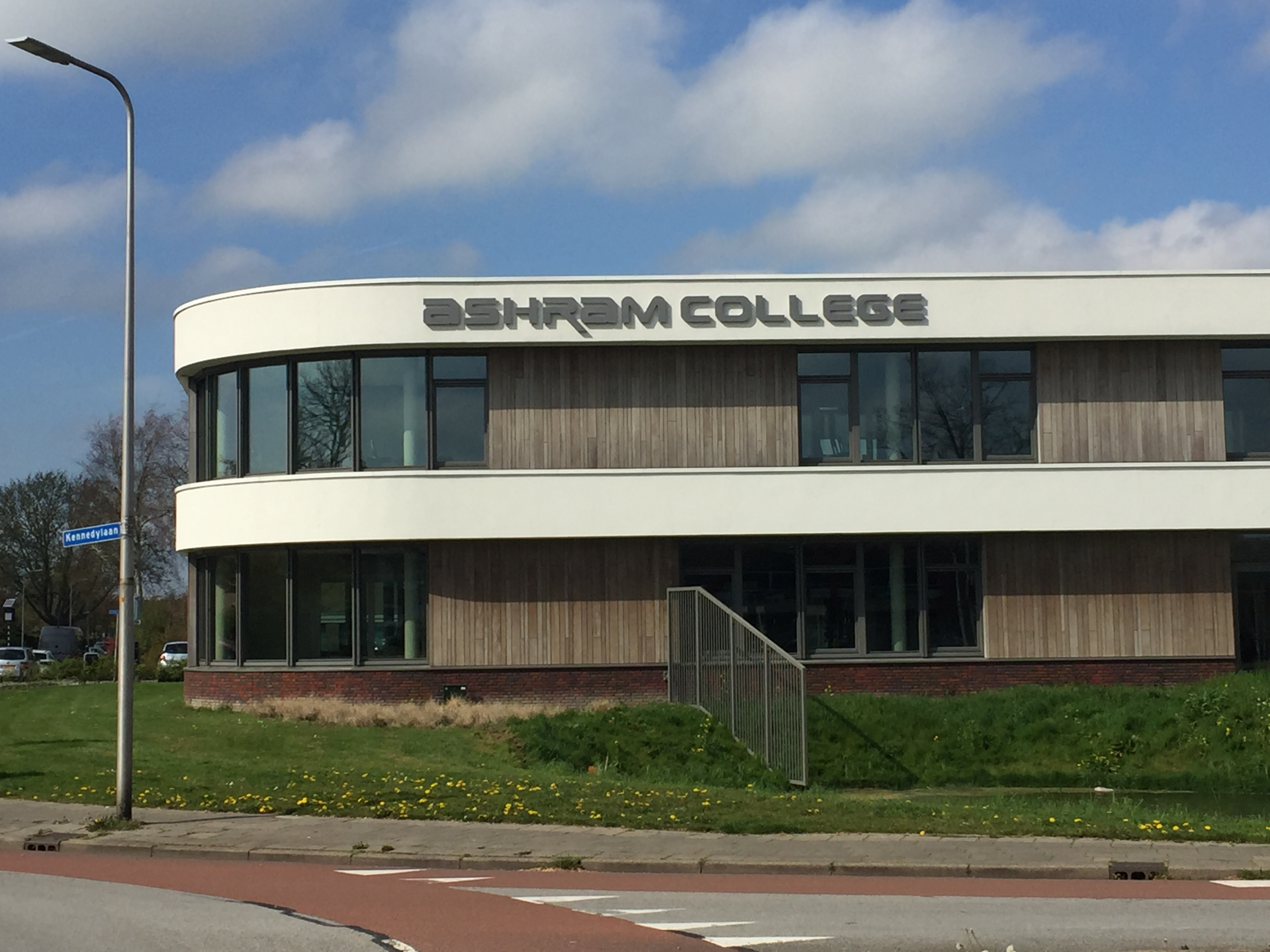
Ashram College, Nieuwkoop

The Ashram College was established in 1929 as the H. Bonifacius-ulo. Students were taught at VMBO-level. Later, in 1971, the school expended and added a HAVO-level to its education system. In 1972, the school changed its name to Ashram College. In 1973, another expansion added the VWO-level to Ashram College. In 1974 the Ashram College merged with De Nieuwe Cope in Nieuwkoop.

== Subjects ==
In the first phase a student will go to one of the three main levels (there are in total 7 levels but those are made out of the main three). VWO - pre-university secondary education, excluding and including the classical languages Latin and Greek, HAVO - higher general continued education and VMBO- preparatory middle-level vocational educationî. The Ashram College gives the opportunity to choose alternative subjects, for example Chinese. At the gymnasium subjects like philosophy and "Research & Design" are included. The student have to choose an additional course on their own, which they will practise four hours in the week. The choices in Alphen aan den Rijn are ‘ArtClass’, based on theater, art and music, ‘Sportlife’, including many sports, ‘Mondo’, reserved for "curious students" and ‘The Young Researcher’), intended for the inquiring pupil. In Nieuwkoop a student can choose between ‘Beauty & Wellness’, ‘SportLife’, ‘Technique’ and ‘The Theater Factory’).

In the second phase a student can choose a 'profile' of his choice, which offers most of the subjects the student is interested in, or suit his capacities. The following profiles can be selected:

- Culture and society - emphasizes arts and foreign languages. The mathematical classes focus on statistics and stochastics. This profile prepares for artistic and cultural training.
- Economy and society - emphasizes social sciences, economics and history. The mathematical classes focus on statistics and stochastics. This profile prepares for management and business administration.
- Nature and health - emphasizes biology and natural sciences. The mathematics classes focus on algebra, geometry and calculus. This profile is necessary to attend medical training.
- Nature and technology - emphasizes natural sciences. The mathematics classes focus on algebra, geometry and calculus. This profile is necessary to attend technological and natural science training.

Beside this profile, a student can also choose another subject of his choice: music (only VWO), Spanish (only VWO), visual arts, informatics, economy (if not included in the profile of the student's choice), philosophy, French, German and acting (only VMBO and HAVO).

Exceptional VWO students are able to choose an extra subject, but they are only permitted to do that if they have great marks for that specific subject.

== Name ==
The name Ashram refers to the Indian ashrams, places where everyone could come to. The particular reason that makes an ashram unique was that origin, religion, study, skin color, etc. do not matter. This is exactly what is predicated in the school, that everyone in this world is equal to each other and that a school should support every individual in their talent. Due to this fact, the motto of the school is ‘Thuis in de wereld’, literally ‘Home in the world’.

== Notable students ==
- Boris van der Ham (1973), politician

== Notable teachers ==
- Karin Spaink (1957), writer, columnist, feminist and activist (English teacher)
