= Martin Demaine =

American artist and mathematician

Martin L. (Marty) Demaine (born 1942) is an artist and mathematician, the Angelika and Barton Weller artist in residence at the Massachusetts Institute of Technology (MIT).

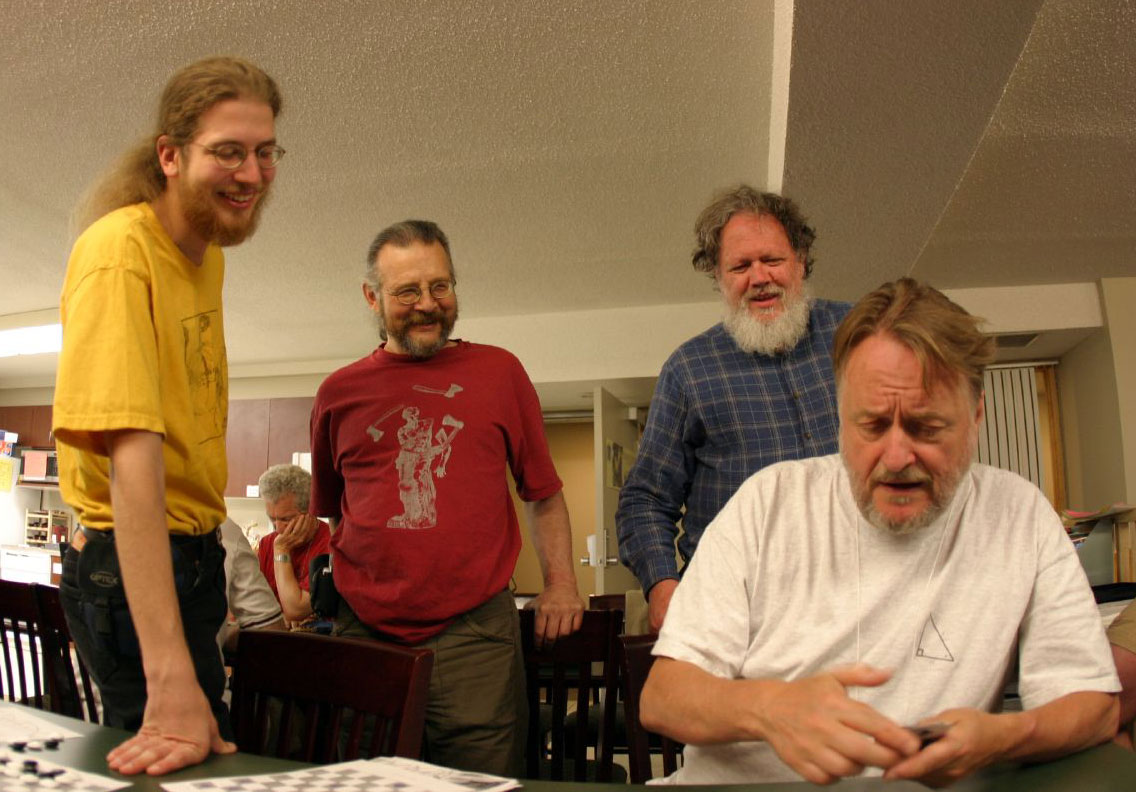
Erik Demaine (left), Martin Demaine (center), and Bill Spight (right) watch John Horton Conway demonstrate a card trick (June 2005)

Demaine attended Medford High School in Medford, Massachusetts. After studying glassblowing in England, he began his artistic career by blowing art glass in New Brunswick in the early 1970s. The Demaine Studio, located in Miramichi Bay and later at Opus Village in Mactaquac, was the first one-man glass studio in Canada, part of the international studio glass movement. Demaine's pieces from this period are represented in the permanent collections of half a dozen major museums including the Canadian Museum of Civilization and the National Gallery of Canada. Since joining MIT, Demaine has begun blowing glass again, as an instructor at the MIT Glass Lab; his newer work features innovative glassblowing techniques intended as a puzzle to his fellow glassblowers.

Martin Demaine is the father of MIT Computer Science professor and MacArthur Fellow Erik Demaine; in 1987 (when Erik was six) they together founded the Erik and Dad Puzzle Company which distributed puzzles throughout Canada. Erik was home-schooled by Martin, and although Martin never received any higher degree than his high school diploma, his home-schooling caused Erik to be awarded a B.S. at age 14 and a Ph.D. and MIT professorship at age 20, making him the youngest professor ever hired by MIT. The two Demaines continue to work closely together and have many joint works of both mathematics and art, including three pieces of mathematical origami in the permanent collection of the Museum of Modern Art, New York, and another three in the permanent collection of the Renwick Gallery of the Smithsonian Museum. Their joint mathematical works focus primarily on the mathematics of folding and unfolding objects out of flat materials such as paper and on the computational complexity of games and puzzles. Martin and Erik were fans of Martin Gardner and in 2001 they teamed up with Gathering 4 Gardner founder Tom M. Rodgers to edit a tribute book for Gardner on his 90th birthday. Father and son are both featured in the movie Between the Folds, a documentary on modern origami.

Demaine is a dual citizen of Canada and the United States.
