= Michael Fellows =

American computer scientist

- Born: Michael Ralph Fellows; June 15, 1952 (age 74); San Diego, California, US
- Education: University of California, San Diego (Ph.D., 1985, Computer Science; M.A.,1982, Mathematics); Sonoma State University (B.A., 1980, Mathematics)
- Scientific career
- Fields: Computer science
- Workplaces: University of Bergen, Norway
- Doctoral advisor: Michael Fredman
- Doctoral students: Elena Prieto-Rodriguez

Michael Ralph Fellows AC HFRSNZ MAE (born June 15, 1952 in Upland, California) is a computer scientist and the Elite Professor of Computer Science in the Department of Informatics at the University of Bergen, Norway as of January 2016.

== Biography ==
Fellows received his BA in mathematics from Sonoma State University, and at the University of California, San Diego (UCSD) his M.A. in mathematics in 1982 and in 1985 his Ph.D. in computer science with the dissertation Encoding Graphs in Graphs.

Until January 2016, Fellows was professor at Charles Darwin University, Australia, and Director of the Parameterized Complexity Research Unit (PCRU). He has taught in the United States, Canada, New Zealand and Australia, as well as in the UK and Europe; and has given invited talks around the world.

In 2018, Fellows was awarded membership in Academia Europaea. In 2016, he received Australia's highest civilian honour, the Order of Australia, Companion to the Queen. In 2014 Fellows became one of ten inaugural fellows of the European Association for Theoretical Computer Science. Also in 2014, he was named an Honorary Fellow of the Royal Society of New Zealand (the first computer scientist to receive this honor). In 2007, Fellows was awarded the Alexander von Humboldt Research Award. His German host was Rolf Niedermeier and Mike spent part of 2007 and most of 2008 at the Friedrich-Schiller-Universität in Jena, Germany, working with Niedermeier. Also in 2007, Mike became one of the first Fellows of the Institute of Advanced Study (Durham), UK and a Fellow of Grey College at the University of Durham. He was also awarded an Australian Research Council Professorial Fellowship for five years, beginning 2010.

He is an Area Editor for the Journal of Computer and System Sciences since 2004, and Advising Editor for the special Section on Parameterized Complexity in the same journal. He is Associate Editor for ACM Transactions on Algorithms. In 2008 he was Guest Editor for a special double issue of The Computer Journal containing 15 surveys on parameterized complexity. He is also Guest Editor (with others) for a Special Issue on Parameterized Complexity in the Journal of Combinatorial Optimization to be published in 2010. He is a member of the Steering Committee for the conference series International Workshop on Parameterized and Exact Computation, proceedings published by Springer in Lecture Notes in Computer Science.

Michael Fellows is co-author of Computer Science Unplugged! www.csunplugged.org book and materials, which bring computational thinking activities to youth and adults and have been translated into over 25 languages. He is known for his innovative science communication. He is an organizer of the Creative Mathematical Sciences Communication (CMSC) conference series. An avid interest in politics was inspired by his mother Betty, long a leader in the California League of Women Voters, and a love of literature and movies is shared with his son, Max. Fellows wrote a series of passion plays about mathematics which were presented at the Victoria Fringe Festival and at NCTM at Asilimar in 1999.

In 1999, he married Frances Novak Rosamond, also a scientist, who shares his love of mathematics and adventure.

== Honors ==
Fellows is recognized as one of the founders of parameterized complexity, a complexity framework that uses structure in hard problems for the design and analysis of algorithms for their solution. Parameterized complexity has strong connections to algorithmic engineering, and is increasingly important in fields as diverse as Artificial Intelligence, Cognitive Science, and Bioinformatics. In 2018, he received the Norwegian Research Council Toppforsk Award for his project, Parameterized Complexity for Practical Computing. The funding scheme supports scientific quality at the forefront of international research; boldness in scientific thinking and innovation.

Dagstuhl Seminar 12241 Data Reduction and Problem Kernels June 10 – 15, 2012 was the occasion to honour Michael R. Fellows on the Occasion of His 60th Birthday. He was presented with a Springer festschrift: The Multivariate Algorithmic Revolution and Beyond - Essays Dedicated Michael R. Fellows on the Occasion of His 60th Birthday. Editors: Hans L. Bodlaender and Rod Downey and Fedor V. Fomin and Daniel Marx. Springer LNCS 7370, DOI 10.1007/978-3- 642-30891-8_8), 2012.

1) Academy Europaea (MAE) 2018. The Academia Europaea is an independent learned society and European Union's Academy of Humanities and Sciences. On the initiative of Royal Society and other National Academies in Europe, the Academia was founded in 1988 as the functioning Europe-wide Academy that encompasses all fields of scholarly inquiry.

2) Order of Australia, Companion to the Queen (AC) 2016. This is Australia's highest civilian honour, similar to UK knighthood. To appreciate this requires a trip to Wikipedia: Of the approximately 400 over the 50 years of the Australian national honours system, over all walks of life (politicians, sports stars, movie stars...) there have been approximately 60 AC academics, of which there are approximately 30 scientists, and of those, 6 Nobel Laureates. I am the first computer scientist to receive this honour.

3) Honorary Fellow of the Royal Society of New Zealand (HFRSNZ) 2014. He is the second person whose primary research area is algorithms to receive this honor. Honorary Fellows include Einstein, Bohr, Curie, Darwin, Fleming, Priestley, Richter, Rutherford, altogether 230 since 1870.

4) EATCS Fellow 2014. Mike has been conferred one of the inaugural first 10 EATCS Fellows for "his role in founding the field of parameterized complexity theory, which has become a major subfield of research in theoretical computer science, and for being a leader in computer science education".

5) EATCS-NERODE Prize 2014. This award at ALGO/ESA and is for a series of papers on how to establish lower bounds on kernelization. The two papers and prize winners are: On problems without polynomial kernels, Hans Bodlaender, Rodney Downey, Michael Fellows, Danny Hermelin. Journal of Computer and System Sciences 2009. Infeasibility of instance compression and succinct PCPs for NP, Lance Fortnow, Rahul Santhanam, same journal 2011.

6) ABZ International Medal of Honor for Fundamental Contributions to Computer Science Education. This award through ETH-Zurich is for Mike's outreach to kids and the community. Fellows wrote Computer Science Unplugged! (www.csunplugged.org with New Zealand colleagues Tim Bell (University of Canterbury, NZ) and Ian Witten (Otago University, NZ). activities are the basis of workshops sponsored by Google across the world. They are used in codeweek.au and in curriculum in UK. The book has been translated into 19 languages. It is a global grass-roots movement. Mike and Frances Rosamond give workshops to Aboriginal schools in Australia, India and around the world.

Professor Fellow says, “The activities are based on modern research in computer science and mathematics. These materials can be used to make early education more exciting and engaging,” Woven through Computer Science Unplugged is the importance of story: that presenting math and computing topics through story-telling and drama can captivate children and adults alike, and provides a whole new level of engagement. Mike's activities are about thinking outside the box, whether sharing the unknowns of computer science and mathematics with elementary school children or running a mathematics event in a park.”

Mike has been an Australian professorial fellow at the University of Newcastle, Australia, and at Charles Darwin University, Australia. He is visiting professor at Royal Holloway University of London. In 2006, he was an inaugural Fellow of the Institute of Advanced Study, Durham University, and at that time a Best Fellow of Grey College. In 2007, Mike received an Alexander von Humboldt Research Award. He collaborates extensively around the world.

=== Computer Science Unplugged! ===
Fellow's books Computer Science Unplugged! written with Tim Bell and Ian Witten, and This is MEGA-Mathematics!, with Nancy Casey convey sophisticated concepts such as intractability, sorting networks, and cryptography. They have won several science popularization awards, and been translated into languages including Japanese, Korean, Arabic, Hebrew, Chinese, Spanish, Swedish, and German, with more translations underway.

Unplugged! was part of the famous British Faraday Christmas Lectures in 2008, which was given by Professor Christopher M. Bishop of UK Microsoft Research.

=== Passion plays about mathematics ===
Fellows is also the author of several passion plays about mathematics, with mathematical proofs enacted on-stage, which were performed at the Fringe Theatre in British Columbia.

== Publications ==
He has published five books and over 150 scientific articles

Books and dissertation:

- 1985. Encoding Graphs in Graphs. Dissertation
- 1990. Constructive Complexity, with Karl Abrahamson and Michael A. Langston
- 1992. This is MEGA-Mathematics, with Nancy Casey
- 1992. Parameterized computational feasibility, with Rod G. Downey
- 2002. Computer Science Unplugged!, with Tim Bell and Ian Witten
- 2013. Fundamentals of Parameterized Complexity, with Rod G. Downey
