= A History of Folding in Mathematics =

2018 book by Michael Friedman

- First edition
- Author: Michael Friedman
- Publisher: Birkhäuser
- Publication date: 2018

A History of Folding in Mathematics: Mathematizing the Margins is a book in the history of mathematics on the mathematics of paper folding. It was written by Michael Friedman and published in 2018 by Birkhäuser as volume 59 of their Historical Studies series.

== Topics ==
The book consists of six chapters, the first of which introduces the problem, sets it in the context of the investigation of the mathematical strength of straightedge and compass constructions, and introduces one of the major themes of the book, the relegation of paper folding to recreational mathematics as this sort of investigation fell out of favor among professional mathematicians, and its more recent resurrection as a serious topic of investigation. As a work of history, the book follows Hans-Jörg Rheinberger in making a distinction between epistemic objects, the not-yet-fully-defined subjects of scientific investigation, and technical objects, the tools used in these investigations, and it links the perceived technicality of folding with its fall from mathematical favor.

The remaining chapters are organized chronologically, beginning in the 16th century and the second chapter. This chapter includes the work of Albrecht Dürer on polyhedral nets, arrangements of polygons in the plane that can be folded to form a given polyhedron, and of Luca Pacioli on the use of folding to replace the compass and straightedge in geometric constructions; it also discusses the history of paper, and paper folding in the context of bookbinding. The third chapter discusses the confluence of Arabic and European mathematics, into the 18th century, with topics including the symmetries of folded objects and the attempted use of folding to prove the parallel postulate. Although Eugenio Beltrami continued to use folded models to investigate non-Euclidean geometry into the 19th century, the fourth chapter of the book argues that other 19th-century uses of folding were more pedagogical, including the use of folded models to demonstrate mathematical concepts, their applications in chemistry, and the introduction of folding into kindergarten programs by Friedrich Fröbel. The late 19th century also saw the publication in India and then the west of the book Geometric Exercises in Paper Folding, by T. Sundara Row.

The final two chapters concern the 20th century and current topics of research in this area. They include work on formalizing paper folding as a form of axiomatic geometry beginning with Margherita Piazzola Beloch, the work of Wilhelm Ahrens in recreational mathematics, and the community of mathematical researchers coming together through the series of International Meetings of Origami Science and Technology (now known as the International Conference on Origami in Science, Math, and Education), and through works popularizing this area within mathematics such as the book Geometric Folding Algorithms by Erik Demaine and Joseph O'Rourke. Appendices include a translation of Beloch's work in this area, and a response to the book The Fold: Leibniz and the Baroque by Gilles Deleuze.

== Audience and reception ==
In reviewing the book, mathematicians Thomas Sonar and James J. Tattersall recommend the book to a general audience interested in mathematics and its history, and reviewer James J. Tattersall writes that it contains "a wealth of mathematical and historical information on a wide selection of topics".

Reviewer William J. Satzer, also a mathematician, disagrees on the target audience, writing that although the book would be of interest to historians of mathematics, it would make difficult reading for others because its topics are too loosely connected. Satzer also faults the book for its omission of Japanese and Chinese threads in its tapestry. On the other hand, Argentine origami book author Laura Rozenberg, despite admitting to skipping over the more mathematical parts of the story, says it "can be read by the non-mathematician without pausing", writing that it felt that "Friedman had read our minds and had decided to indulge us with answers to problems that have beset paperfolding aficionados for years". And historian Anne Por, reviewing the book, writes that "this work is not only highly informative but also particularly pleasant to read."
