= Geometric Exercises in Paper Folding =

1893 book on making polygons with origami

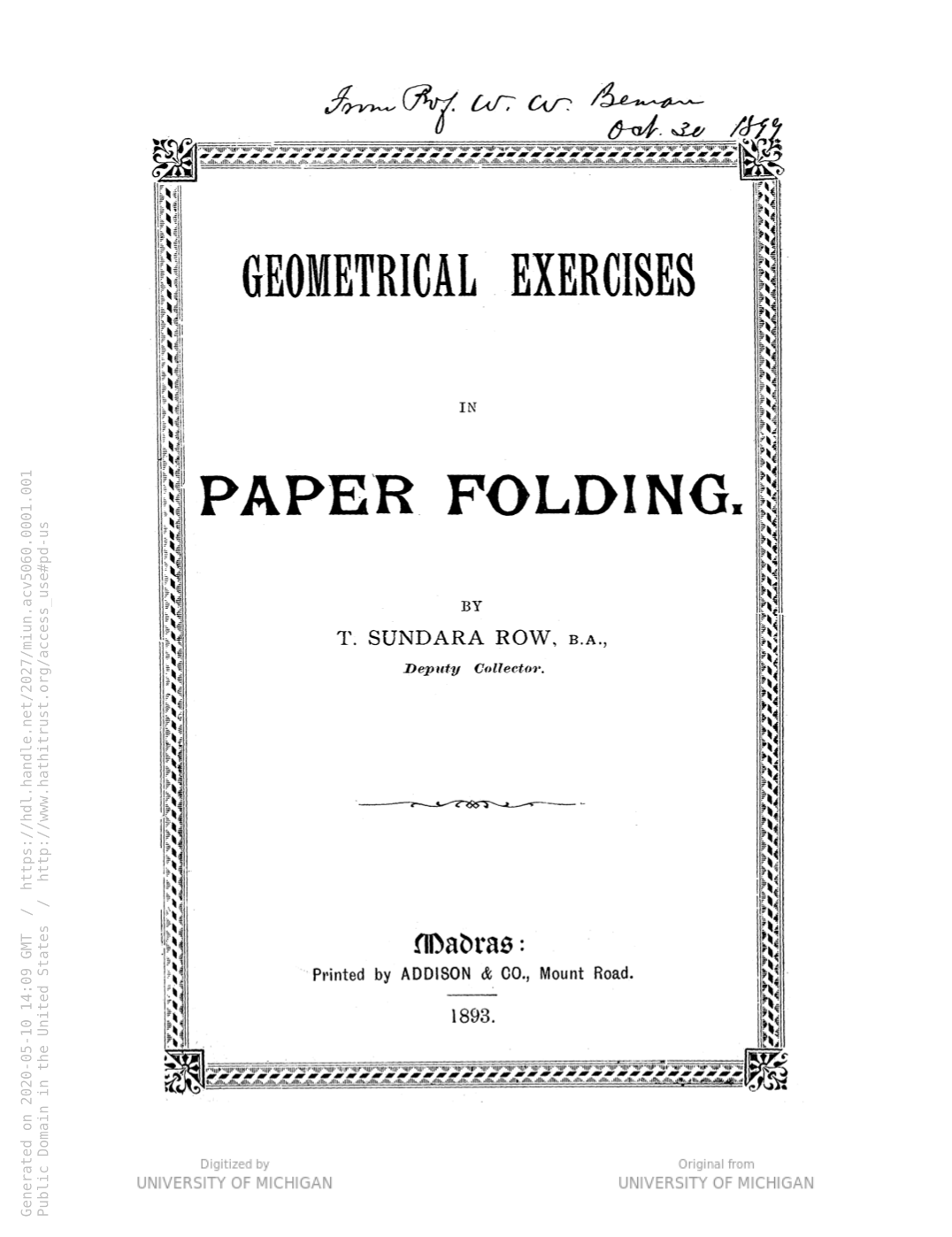
- Title page of the first edition
- Author: T. Sundara Row
- Language: English
- Publisher: Addison & Co.
- Publication date: 1893
- Publication place: India
- Media type: Print
- Pages: 114

Geometric Exercises in Paper Folding is a book on the mathematics of paper folding. It was written by Indian mathematician T. Sundara Row, first published in India in 1893, and later republished in many other editions. Its topics include paper constructions for regular polygons, symmetry, and algebraic curves. According to the historian of mathematics Michael Friedman, it became "one of the main engines of the popularization of folding as a mathematical activity".

== Publication history ==
Geometric Exercises in Paper Folding was first published by Addison & Co. in Madras in 1893. The book became known in Europe through a remark of Felix Klein in his book Vorträge über ausgewählte Fragen der Elementargeometrie (1895) and its translation Famous Problems Of Elementary Geometry (1897). Based on the success of Geometric Exercises in Paper Folding in Germany, the Open Court Press of Chicago published it in the US, with updates by Wooster Woodruff Beman and David Eugene Smith. Although Open Court listed four editions of the book, published in 1901, 1905, 1917, and 1941, the content did not change between these editions. The fourth edition was also published in London by La Salle, and both presses reprinted the fourth edition in 1958.

The contributions of Beman and Smith to the Open Court editions have been described as "translation and adaptation", despite the fact that the original 1893 edition was already in English. Beman and Smith also replaced many footnotes with references to their own work, replaced some of the diagrams by photographs, and removed some remarks specific to India. In 1966, Dover Publications of New York published a reprint of the 1905 edition, and other publishers of out-of-copyright works have also printed editions of the book.

== Topics ==
Geometric Exercises in Paper Folding shows how to construct various geometric figures using paper-folding in place of the classical Greek Straightedge and compass constructions.

The book begins by constructing regular polygons beyond the classical constructible polygons of 3, 4, or 5 sides, or of any power of two times these numbers, and the construction by Carl Friedrich Gauss of the heptadecagon, it also provides a paper-folding construction of the regular nonagon, not possible with compass and straightedge. The nonagon construction involves angle trisection, but Rao is vague about how this can be performed using folding; an exact and rigorous method for folding-based trisection would have to wait until the work in the 1930s of Margherita Piazzola Beloch. The construction of the square also includes a discussion of the Pythagorean theorem. The book uses high-order regular polygons to provide a geometric calculation of pi.

A discussion of the symmetries of the plane includes congruence, similarity, and collineations of the projective plane; this part of the book also covers some of the major theorems of projective geometry including Desargues's theorem, Pascal's theorem, and Poncelet's closure theorem.

Later chapters of the book show how to construct algebraic curves including the conic sections, the conchoid, the cubical parabola, the witch of Agnesi, the cissoid of Diocles, and the Cassini ovals. The book also provides a gnomon-based proof of Nicomachus's theorem that the sum of the first $n$ cubes is the square of the sum of the first $n$ integers, and material on other arithmetic series, geometric series, and harmonic series.

There are 285 exercises, and many illustrations, both in the form of diagrams and (in the updated editions) photographs.

== Influences ==
Tandalam Sundara Row was born in 1853, the son of a college principal, and earned a bachelor's degree at the Kumbakonam College in 1874, with second-place honours in mathematics. He became a tax collector in Tiruchirappalli, retiring in 1913, and pursued mathematics as an amateur. As well as Geometric Exercises in Paper Folding, he also wrote a second book, Elementary Solid Geometry, published in three parts from 1906 to 1909.

One of the sources of inspiration for Geometric Exercises in Paper Folding was Kindergarten Gift No. VIII: Paper-folding. This was one of the Froebel gifts, a set of kindergarten activities designed in the early 19th century by Friedrich Fröbel. The book was also influenced by an earlier Indian geometry textbook, First Lessons in Geometry, by Bhimanakunte Hanumantha Rao (1855–1922). First Lessons drew inspiration from Fröbel's gifts in setting exercises based on paper-folding, and from the book Elementary Geometry: Congruent Figures by Olaus Henrici in using a definition of geometric congruence based on matching shapes to each other and well-suited for folding-based geometry.

In turn, Geometric Exercises in Paper Folding inspired other works of mathematics. A chapter in Mathematische Unterhaltungen und Spiele [Mathematical Recreations and Games] by Wilhelm Ahrens (1901) concerns folding and is based on Rao's book, inspiring the inclusion of this material in several other books on recreational mathematics. Other mathematical publications have studied the curves that can be generated by the folding processes used in Geometric Exercises in Paper Folding. In 1934, Margherita Piazzola Beloch began her research on axiomatizing the mathematics of paper-folding, a line of work that would eventually lead to the Huzita–Hatori axioms in the late 20th century. Beloch was explicitly inspired by Rao's book, titling her first work in this area "Alcune applicazioni del metodo del ripiegamento della carta di Sundara Row" ["Several applications of the method of folding a paper of Sundara Row"].

== Audience and reception ==
The original intent of Geometric Exercises in Paper Folding was twofold: as an aid in geometry instruction, and as a work of recreational mathematics to inspire interest in geometry in a general audience. Edward Mann Langley, reviewing the 1901 edition, suggested that its content went well beyond what should be covered in a standard geometry course. And in their own textbook on geometry using paper-folding exercises, The First Book of Geometry (1905), Grace Chisholm Young and William Henry Young heavily criticized Geometric Exercises in Paper Folding, writing that it is "too difficult for a child, and too infantile for a grown person". However, reviewing the 1966 Dover edition, mathematics educator Pamela Liebeck called it "remarkably relevant" to the discovery learning techniques for geometry instruction of the time, and in 2016 computational origami expert Tetsuo Ida, introducing an attempt to formalize the mathematics of the book, wrote "After 123 years, the significance of the book remains."
