= Fujita =

Fujita (written: 藤田, 富士田 or 冨士田) is a Japanese surname. It is occasionally Romanised as Huzita or Foujita. Notable people with the surname include:

- Akane Fujita (voice actress) (藤田 茜; born 1993), Japanese voice actress
- Akane Fujita (wrestler) (藤田 あかね; born 1987), Japanese professional wrestler
- Asuka Fujita (藤田 明日香; born 1996), Japanese handball player
- Atsushi Fujita (藤田 敦史; born 1976), Japanese long-distance runner
- Aya Fujita (藤田 綾; born 1987), Japanese shogi player
- Emi Fujita (藤田 恵美; born 1963), Japanese singer
- Ena Fujita (藤田 恵名; born 1990), Japanese musician and model
- Etsuji Fujita (藤田 悦司; born 1961), Japanese water polo player
- Frank Fujita, one of only two Japanese American combat personnel to be captured by the Japanese during World War Two
- Gorō Fujita (藤田 五郎; 1844–1915), later name of Saitō Hajime (斎藤 一), Japanese samurai and police officer
- Humiaki Huzita (藤田 文章; 1924-2005), Japanese mathematician and origami artist, who spent most of his career in Italy
- Ibuki Fujita (藤田 息吹; born 1991), Japanese footballer
- Iyōzō Fujita (藤田 怡与蔵; 1917–2006), Japanese World War II flying ace
- Junpei Fujita (藤田 淳平; born 1979), Japanese arranger and composer
- Kazuyuki Fujita (藤田 和之; born 1970), Japanese professional wrestler, mixed martial arts fighter and amateur wrestler
- Kiyoshi Fujita (藤田 キヨシ; born 1972), Japanese ice hockey player
- Kyohei Fujita (藤田 喬平; 1921–2004), Japanese glass artist
- Maiko Fujita (藤田 麻衣子; born 1984), Japanese singer, first single "Koi ni Ochite", theme of game Hiiro no Kakera
- Makoto Fujita (藤田 まこと; 1933–2010), Japanese actor
- Makoto Fujita (chemist) (藤田 誠; born 1957), Japanese chemist
- Masaaki Fujita (藤田 正明; 1922–1996), Japanese politician
- Masaki Fujita (born 1985), Japanese para-cyclist
- Masahisa Fujita (藤田 昌久; born 1943), Japanese economist
- Mineo Fujita (藤田 峰雄; born 1979), Japanese professional wrestler
- Minoru Fujita (藤田 穣; born 1977), Japanese professional wrestler
- Nobuo Fujita (藤田 信雄; 1911–1997), Warrant Flying Officer of the Imperial Japanese Navy; conducted the only wartime aircraft bombings on the continental United States
- S. Neil Fujita (1921–2010), American graphic designer
- Saichiro Fujita (藤田 左弌郎; 1886–1976), the second Japanese Bahá'í
- Saki Fujita (藤田 咲; born 1984), Japanese voice actress
- Scott Fujita (born 1978), American NFL linebacker
- Seiko Fujita (藤田 西湖; 1898–1966), Japanese martial artist and Ninja
- Shouzou Fujita (藤田 省三; 1927–2003), Japanese political theorist
- Tatsuzo Fujita (藤田 辰三; 1908–?), Japanese hurdler
- Ted Fujita (1920–1998), meteorologist, creator of the Fujita scale
- Tokuaki Fujita (藤田 徳明; born 1941), Japanese sport wrestler
- Tokiyasu Fujita (藤⽥ 宙靖; born 1940), member of the Supreme Court of Japan
- Toshiko Fujita (藤田 淑子; 1950–2018) Japanese voice actress
- Toshiya Fujita (藤田 俊哉; born 1971), Japanese footballer
- Toshiya Fujita (director) (藤田 敏八; 1932–1997), film director
- Tsuguharu Foujita (藤田 嗣治; 1886–1968), Japanese artist, who spent much of his career in France
- Yohei Fujita (藤田 洋平; born 1988), Japanese professional wrestler known as Yo-Hey
- Yoshinaga Fujita (藤田 宜永; 1950–2020), Japanese novelist and screenwriter
- Yoshio Fujita (藤田 良雄; 1908–2013), Japanese astronomer
- Yukihisa Fujita (藤田 幸久; born 1950), Japanese member of parliament
- Yūzan Fujita (藤田 雄山; 1949–2015), Governor of Hiroshima Prefecture

== See also ==
- Fujita (company), Japanese Osaka-based zaibatsu
- Fujita scale
- Fujita salvage operation
