= Emanuel Pimenta =

Emanuel Pimenta may refer to:

- Emanuel Dimas de Melo Pimenta (born 1957), Brazilian musician, architect, and intermedia artist
- Emanuel Eduardo Pimenta Vieira Silva (born 1985), Portuguese flatwater canoer
