= Tomohiro Tachi =

Japanese origamist (born 1982)

Tomohiro Tachi (Japanese: 舘 知宏, born 1982) is a Japanese academic who studies origami from an interdisciplinary perspective, combining approaches from the mathematics of paper folding, structural rigidity, computational geometry, architecture, and materials science. His work was profiled in "The Origami Revolution" (2017), part of the Nova series of US science documentaries. He is a professor at the University of Tokyo.

== Education and career ==
Tachi studied engineering and architecture at the University of Tokyo, earning bachelor's and master's degrees in 2005 and 2007 respectively, and completing his Ph.D. in 2010. He became an assistant professor in the Department of General Systems Studies at the University of Tokyo in 2010, and became an associate professor in 2018, adding at the same time affiliations with the Department of Information and Graphic Sciences and Department of Architecture.

== Contributions ==
Tachi has been called a "renowned origami artist", and "one of the world experts on rigid origami. His artworks include a "calculated and precise" nudibranch, folded from mirror-finished metal, and an origami version of the Utah teapot, exhibited at the Tikotin Museum of Japanese Art in Israel.

With Erik Demaine, he has developed software that can automatically transform any three-dimensional object, represented as a polygon mesh, into an origami model of the object. His research also includes generalized versions of the Miura fold that can be used to model any smooth surface, and bistable hyperbolic paraboloid structures formed from nested square origami folds.

With Hiroya Tanaka, he is the author of the 2020 Japanese-language book コンピュテーショナル・ファブリケーション [Computational Fabrication: Design and Science of Origami and Tessellation].

== Recognition ==
In 2009, Tachi won the Hangai Prize of the International Association for Shell and Spatial Structures (IASS), for his work on quadrilateral mesh origami. His work with Kōryō Miura on flexible polyhedra derived from the Miura fold won the 2013 Tsuboi Award of the IASS.

He was the recipient of the 2016 A. T. Yang Memorial Award in Theoretical Kinematics of the American Society of Mechanical Engineers, with Tom Hull, for their joint work on predicting the motion of rigid origami patterns when forces are applied to them in their flat state. Together with his coauthors Evgueni T. Filipov and Glaucio H. Paulino, Tachi won the 2020 Cozzarelli Prize in Engineering and Applied Sciences for their work using the Miura fold to generate stiff but reconfigurable tubular structures.
