= TectoRNA =

TectoRNAs are modular RNA units able to self-assemble into larger nanostructures in a programmable fashion. They are generated by rational design through an approach called RNA architectonics, which make use of RNA structural modules identified in natural (or sometimes artificial) RNA molecules to form pre-defined 3D structures spontaneously.

The abilities of RNA which is capable of catalysis and non-canonical base pairing make it an attractive biomolecule for design. By applying the knowledge of computational modeling and biochemical characterization, RNA can be shaped into defined geometries and conduct various functions. As such, tectoRNA can also carry functions to build large functional nanostructures which can be used for synthetic biology and nanotechnology application.

== Overview ==
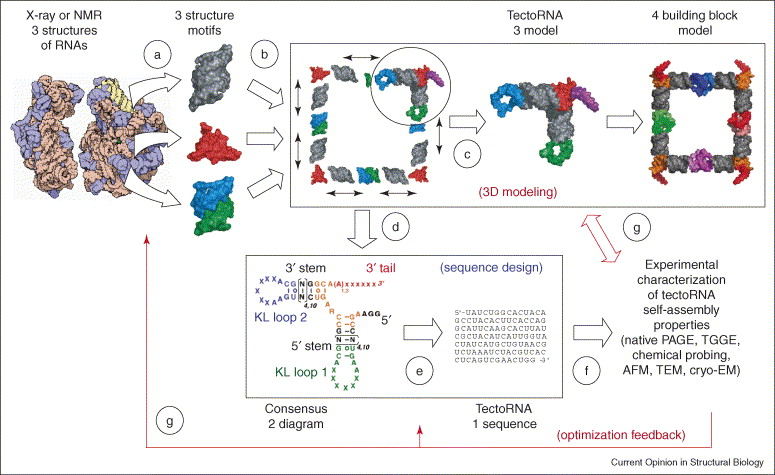
The RNA tectonics methodology.

Nadrian Seeman was the first one who proposed that DNA could be used as material for generating nanoscopic self-assembling structures. This concept was extended to RNA by Jaeger and collaborators in 2000 by taking advantage of the concept of RNA tectonics initially proposed by Jaeger and Westhof and collaborators in 1996.

To design a tectoRNA, the deep knowledge of RNA tertiary structure is required. The rational design of tectoRNA is based on known X-ray and NMR structures. TectoRNAs can be seen as analogous to words, and, by using the natural syntax of RNA structural motifs, all kinds of thermodynamically stable shapes can be rationally designed and synthesized. The sequence specifying for stable, recurrent, and modular structural motifs, e.g. GNRA tetraloop, kissing loops, kink turns, A-minor interaction, etc., can be encoded within tectoRNAs to control their geometry and self-assembly into nanostructures. However, tectoRNA can also incorporate flexible junctions and RNA modules (or RNA aptamers) responsive to ligands.

Nowadays, extensive databases and powerful algorithms can be useful tools to design sequences of tectoRNAs. The folding of tectoRNAs are optimized by minimizing the free energy and maximizing their thermodynamic stability. The RNA sequences are mainly transcribed in vitro, and the folding condition for RNA is also important. Mg^{2+} and other salts must be added into solution and the concentration is well controlled to fold RNA properly. Their expected folding and self-assembly properties are characterized by a wide range of biochemical tools. Native poly-acrylamide gel electrophoresis (PAGE) is used to test the K_{d} of self-assembled tectoRNAs. Temperature gradient gel electrophoresis (TGGE) is applied to characterize the thermodynamic stability of nanostructures. Chemical probing, like DMS probing, allows us to indirectly understand the folding of RNA structure. Atomic force microscopy (AFM), transmission electron microscopy (TEM), and cryo-EM are powerful techniques which give us a direct clue how RNA nanostructures look like. By far, delicate structures like squares or hearts have been successfully demonstrated in different research.

== RNA architectonics or RNA modular origami ==
TectoRNAs are the basic self-assembling unit in RNA architectonics. In RNA architectonics, the sequence length of tectoRNA is usually less than 200 nts. TectoRNAs are typically originating from single stranded RNA molecules and once folded, they act like LEGO bricks to build up higher order architectures. They can be synthesized, folded and self-assembled into multimeric nanostructures during transcription in isothermal conditions. As such, the RNA architectonics approach can be seen as RNA modular origami. This approach was extended to the synthesis of larger self-assembling units of more than 400 nts. More recently, RNA origami was extended to the design of long single stranded RNA sequences able to fold into large pre-defined nanostructures. Hence, RNA modular origami (originally called RNA architectonics), RNA origami and RNA single stranded origami are both originating from the same concept where RNA sequences can be design to self-fold and assemble into predefined shapes. Note that conceptually, DNA single stranded origami is more related to RNA origami than DNA origami.

== Applications ==
Though RNA nanotechnology is still a burgeoning field, tectoRNAs and resulting nanostructures have already been shown to be useful in nanomedicine, nanotechnology, and synthetic biology. This includes the development of programmable nano-scaffolds and nano-particles for the delivery of RNA therapeutics. As such, RNA nanoparticles, like hexagonal nanorings, can be used as a delivery vehicle carrying therapeutic RNA to targeting cells. It is also possible to incorporate modified nucleotides within tectoRNAs in order to increase their chemical stability and resistant towards degradation. Yet, the full potential of tectoRNAs and resulting nanostructures for recruiting proteins and ligands still remain largely unexplored.

== See also ==
- DNA nanotechnology
- DNA origami
- RNA origami
