= Geometric Origami =

Book on the mathematics of paper folding

Geometric Origami is a book on the mathematics of paper folding, focusing on the ability to simulate and extend classical straightedge and compass constructions using origami. It was written by Austrian mathematician Robert Geretschläger and published by Arbelos Publishing (Shipley, UK) in 2008. The Basic Library List Committee of the Mathematical Association of America has suggested its inclusion in undergraduate mathematics libraries.

== Topics ==
The book is divided into two main parts. The first part is more theoretical. It outlines the Huzita–Hatori axioms for mathematical origami, and proves that they are capable of simulating any straightedge and compass construction. It goes on to show that, in this mathematical model, origami is strictly more powerful than straightedge and compass: with origami, it is possible to solve any cubic equation or quartic equation. In particular, origami methods can be used to trisect angles, and for doubling the cube, two problems that have been proven to have no exact solution using only straightedge and compass.

The second part of the book focuses on folding instructions for constructing regular polygons using origami, and on finding the largest copy of a given regular polygon that can be constructed within a given square sheet of origami paper. With straightedge and compass, it is only possible to exactly construct regular $n$-gons for which $n$ is a product of a power of two with distinct Fermat primes (powers of two plus one): this allows $n$ to be 3, 5, 6, 8, 10, 12, etc. These are called the constructible polygons. With a construction system that can trisect angles, such as mathematical origami, more numbers of sides are possible, using Pierpont primes in place of Fermat primes, including $n$-gons for $n$ equal to 7, 13, 14, 17, 19, etc. Geometric Origami provides explicit folding instructions for 15 different regular polygons, including those with 3, 5, 6, 7, 8, 9, 10, 12, 13, 17, and 19 sides. Additionally, it discusses approximate constructions for polygons that cannot be constructed exactly in this way.

== Audience and reception ==
This book is quite technical, aimed more at mathematicians than at amateur origami enthusiasts looking for folding instructions for origami artworks. However, it may be of interest to origami designers, looking for methods to incorporate folding patterns for regular polygons into their designs. Origamist David Raynor suggests that its methods could also be useful in constructing templates from which to cut out clean unfolded pieces of paper in the shape of the regular polygons that it discusses, for use in origami models that use these polygons as a starting shape instead of the traditional square paper.

Geometric Origami may also be useful as teaching material for university-level geometry and abstract algebra, or for undergraduate research projects extending those subjects, although reviewer Mary Fortune cautions that "there is much preliminary material to be covered" before a student would be ready for such a project. Reviewer Georg Gunther summarizes the book as "a delightful addition to a wonderful corner of mathematics where art and geometry meet", recommending it as a reference for "anyone with a working knowledge of elementary geometry, algebra, and the geometry of complex numbers".
