= Emanuel Dimas de Melo Pimenta =

Brazilian musician, artist and architect (born 1857)

Emanuel Dimas de Melo Pimenta (born in São Paulo, Brazil, 1957) is a Brazilian-Portuguese (Swiss resident since 2003) musician, architect, photographer and intermedia artist. His works, connecting art and sciences, have been included in art collections and have been recognized by institutions such as the Whitney Museum of New York, the Ars Aevi Contemporary Art Museum, the Venice Biennale, the Kunsthaus Zürich, the Bibliothèque nationale de France at Paris, the MART – Museum of Modern and Contemporary Art of Rovereto and Trento, and the Shöyen Collection among others.

Emanuel Pimenta studied with Hans-Joachim Koellreuter, Conrado Silva, Eduardo Kneese de Mello, Decio Pignatari, Lygia Clark, and also with Kenzo Tange, Burle Marx, Yona Friedman, Peter Cook (Archigram) and Oscar Niemeyer among others.

== Career ==
Pimenta develops music, architecture, and urban projects using virtual reality and cyberspace technologies. His concerts of music integrate visual art and have been performed in various countries in the last twenty years, beginning with his concert at the São Paulo Art Biennial, in 1985, with John Cage, Francesco Clemente, Sandro Chia, and Robert Rauschenberg.

Pimenta has collaborated with John Cage, as commissioned composer for Merce Cunningham between 1986 and 2009, remaining composer for the Merce Cunningham Legacy Project until now. He has been composer for several companies such as the Appels Company in New York. His concerts have been performed at the Lincoln Center and The Kitchen in New York, the Palais Garnier, Opera Bastille, La Fenice, the Shinjuku Bunka Center in Tokyo, the Festival of Aix en Provence, and the São Paulo Museum of Art among many others. In 2012, Emanuel Pimenta coordinated 38 events, in 11 countries, celebrating the centennial of John Cage.

In late 1970s, Emanuel Pimenta started developing a new graphic four dimensional musical notation inside Virtual Reality, which he called "virtual notations", which would characterize good part of his musical production over the years.

In the early 1980s, Emanuel Pimenta coined the concept "virtual architecture", later largely used as specific discipline in universities all over the world. Since the end of the 1970s he has developed graphical musical notations inside virtual environments.

In 1980, Pimenta starts the first virtual planet in history, called Woiksed, for which he won the Lake Maggiore Prize (AICA, UNESCO, Council of Europe) in 1993, anticipating similar projects for over twenty years.

In 1993 he created, together with René Berger and Rinaldo Bianda, the Eurovideo Festival.

In 2000, Emanuel Pimenta began researching and creating space architecture design.

Pimenta's first opera is dated of 1984, titled Frankenstern, with libretto by Decio Pignatari and stage design by the Brazilian visual artist Fernando Zarif, at MASP Modern Art Museum of São Paulo.

In 2008, Pimenta creates DANTE, the first opera on Dante Alighieri's Divine Comedy of the history of music, which had its world première in that year at the Abstracta Festival, in Rome, Italy.

In 2016, he concluded his third opera, titled Metamorphosis, with libretto by René Berger, with world première at the Experimental Intermedia Foundation, in New York City, under direction of the American composer Phill Niblock. In 2016 Pimenta was invited to the 1th edition of the Lisbon-based The New Art Fest.

In 2017, Pimenta received the Gold Medal of the Academy of Arts, Sciences and Letters of Paris.

Since the 1970s, Emanuel Pimenta has been a prolific writer, with more than eighty books published in several countries.

=== Positions ===
He has served as a curator for the Biennale of São Paulo, the Calouste Gulbenkian Foundation, the Triennial of Milan, and the Belém Cultural Center among others.

Pimenta is a founding member of the International Society for the Interdisciplinary Study of Symmetry, and of ISA International Symmetry Association, created by the Hungarian crystallographer Gyorgy Darvas, together with Dan Shechtman, Fritjof Capra, Francisco Varela, Douglas Hofstadter and Arthur Lee Loeb among others. Between 1987 and 1996 he was one of the coordinators of the Locarno Video Art and Electronic Art Festivals, in Locarno, Switzerland, together with Rinaldo Bianda, Between 1995 and 2015 he was member of the jury of the BES Fellowship (Experimental Intermedia Foundation of New York, the Luso American Foundation and the Calouste Gulbenkian Foundation), with the composer Phill Niblock. He is director of the art, sciences, music and philosophy Academy Holotopia, in the Amalfi Coast. which started with a contemporary music festival in 2004. He is also founder and director of the Foundation for Arts, Sciences and Technology – Observatory, in Trancoso, Portugal. He was editorial director of the art and culture magazine RISK Arte Oggi from 1995 to 2005. He was also member of the advisory editorial board of the science magazine Forma, in Tokyo. He is member of the art and philosophy magazine Technoetic Arts, in Bristol, England, directed by Roy Ascott.

In 1991 he created the European Environmental Tribunal, a non profit entity oriented to culture under a transdisciplinary approach.

In 2000 he founded the Walden Zero Project, joining artworks, books, sounds and documents since the 14th century to the electronic age.

Emanuel Pimenta is an active member of the New York Academy of Sciences, of the Space Architecture Technical Committee of the American Institute of Aeronautics and Astronautics, of the American Association for the Advancement of Science, of the American Society of Media Photographers, of the Portuguese Order of Architects and of the Brazilian Council of Architecture and Urban Planning.

In 1990 he started working with Lucrezia De Domizio, Baroness Durini in many art projects around the world.

In 2015, Emanuel Pimenta was director of the world contemporary art forum Free International Forum, in Abruzzo, Italy.

Since 2012, Emanuel Pimenta has been researcher associated to the University of Minho in Portugal, and USP University of São Paulo, in Brazil.

In 2018 he founds, together with Jean Olaniszyn, Liberio Bianchi and Davide Rossi the PAN Cinema and Photography Association Muralto, in the city of Muralto, Switzerland, as director of experimental cinema.

=== Some Projects ===
- Abell 2218
- Deep Ocean
- Dr. Jekyll & Mr. X, in 2004
- Kirkos
- RAWWAR (random accelerating world, world and revolution)
- Zyklus,
- DEEP OCEAN
- European Environmental Tribunal 2006
- SETI
- SOULS 35 Years
- DANTE – opera, Rome 2008
- CENTRAL PARK, New York, 20 Years
- Space Architecture USP University of São Paulo, 2012
- KAIROS
- JOHN CAGE 100 Years

=== Publications ===
Some Books:

- Fiat Lux – Light Museum (2018)
- My Father and My Grandfather – A Hundred Years Journey in Time (2018)
- The Grasshopper Man – and the Metamorphosis of the Electronic Society (2017)
- Lucrezia: A Volcanic Voyage in Art (2017)
- Decameron - A Dream with Boccaccio (2017)
- Virtus - Design of the Infinite (2016)
- René Berger - Knight of the Invisible (2016)
- ARCHITECTS – Photographic Essay, 2000 Years of Architecture (2016)
- WOIKSED – Virtual Planet, architecture and beyond (2015)
- MUSIC – A Brief History of the Western Musical Thought (2014)
- Mundo Metamorfose (2014) – Portuguese
- Nemesis – Digital Art 1980 (2014)
- PULSAR – Space Architecture on Earth (2014)
- SOULS 40 Years – Volumes One, Two, Three, Four (Photography Essay 1973–2013) (2013)
- The Free Waters' Mystery – The Magical Aqueduct of Lisbon (2013)
- URBIS – The Skin of the Planet – Volumes One, Two and Three (2013)
- Odyssey – a poetic voyage to Homer (2013)
- SPACE ARCHITECTURE – Buildings for the Outer Space (2013)
- UIRA Orbital Olympic Village (2012)
- KAIROS – A Bird Orbiting Planet Earth – architecture, art, philosophy, technology (2012)
- Morocco . One Thousand and One Lights (photography) (2011)
- Mr. Chico – A Zen Master in the Forests (2012)
- John Cage – Koan of Non-Violence (2012)
- John Cage – The Silence of the Music, 100 Years (2012)
- John Cage – How to Change the World (2012)
- One Hundred Years with John Cage – A Celebration (2012)
- 30 Years of Architecture (2011)
- Hidden Beings – Nine Texts, One Photographic Essay (2011)
- LOW POWER SOCIETY – philosophy, social sciences, aesthetics (2011)
- KIRKOS – A Dialogue Between Marcel Duchamp and Josqin Desprès (2011)
- Art and Zen (2011)
- MONDO – Literature and Democracy (2010)
- crowdknowspear – on Walt Whitman (2010)
- On Friendship – on Marcus Tullius Cicero (2010)
- On Nature – on Ralph Waldo Emerson (2010)
- Neapolis – the visual time of Naples (photography) (2010)
- Ascona – a photographic essay (2010)
- FIRENZE – mind battle fields of a magical city (photography) (2010)
- KOELLREUTTER – the musical revolutions of a Zen master (2010)
- LOGICAL TRAPS – 30 years of works in 15 years of interviews (2010)
- Walden Zero – a transdisciplinary project (2010)
- VIRTUAL NOTATIONS – 30 years of music inside virtual environments (2010)
- MEDAUAR – o homem que sabia demais (2011) (Portuguese)
- Teleantropos – A Desmaterialização da Cultura Material (1999) (Portuguese)
- TAPAS – A Impermanência das Coisas e das Idéias, Arquitetura e Inconsciente (1985) (Portuguese)

=== Discography ===
Some cds:

- CLUE-UP DUE ABYSS (piano: Marco Rapattoni) concert at Monte Verità, Ascona, Switzerland, celebrating 150 years of Claude Debussy (2014)
- COLLISION (violoncello: Audrey Riley) concert at La Virreina, Barcelona, Spain (2012)
- BEETHOVEN'S CAGE | M | OCEAN2, concert at EIF Experimental Intermedia Foundation, New York City (2012)
- STliz – to celebrate Franz Lizst's 200 years (2012)
- MARS (piano: Emanuel Pimenta), concert at Palace Foz, Lisbon, Portugal (2011)
- REED – music for Merce Cunningham, New York City (2009)
- CANTO 6409 – music for the earthquake victims in Abruzzo, concert at the International Film Festival of Cannes, France (2009)
- ON CIVIL DISOBEDIENCE – music for Morse Code, New York City (2008)
- LEONARDO IN LOCARNO – concert celebrating the 500 years of a Leonardo da Vinci's building in the city of Locarno, Switzerland (2007)

=== Movies ===
Since the 1970s, Emanuel Pimenta has written and directed movies, specially experimental ones. In 1975 he co-directed and co-edited a documentary movie with the French photographer and filmmaker Jean Manzon, who was assistant to Orson Welles in Brazil, in the 1940s.

Some movies:

- FLUXUS (1979)
- As Time Goes By – Abstracta Festival 2011
- KLEVE, at the Kunsthaus Zürich
- CEJB, in Pescara, Italy
- MUSIC – A Brief History of the Western Musical Thought
- ALMEIDA
- LUCREZIA
- LA CONDITION HUMAINE

Pimenta's work has been featured or appeared in:

- Encyclopædia Universalis (Britannica) since 1991
- Sloninsky Baker's Music Dictionary (Berkeley)
- Chronology of the Western Classical Music
- Allmusic – The Expert's Guide to the Best Cds
- The New York Times
- Le Monde
- Le Parisien
- O Estado de S. Paulo
- O Globo
- Il Sole 24 Ore
- Domus (magazine)
- Abitare
- Jornal de Letras
- The Wire (magazine)
