= Ileana Streinu =

Romanian-American computer scientist and mathematician

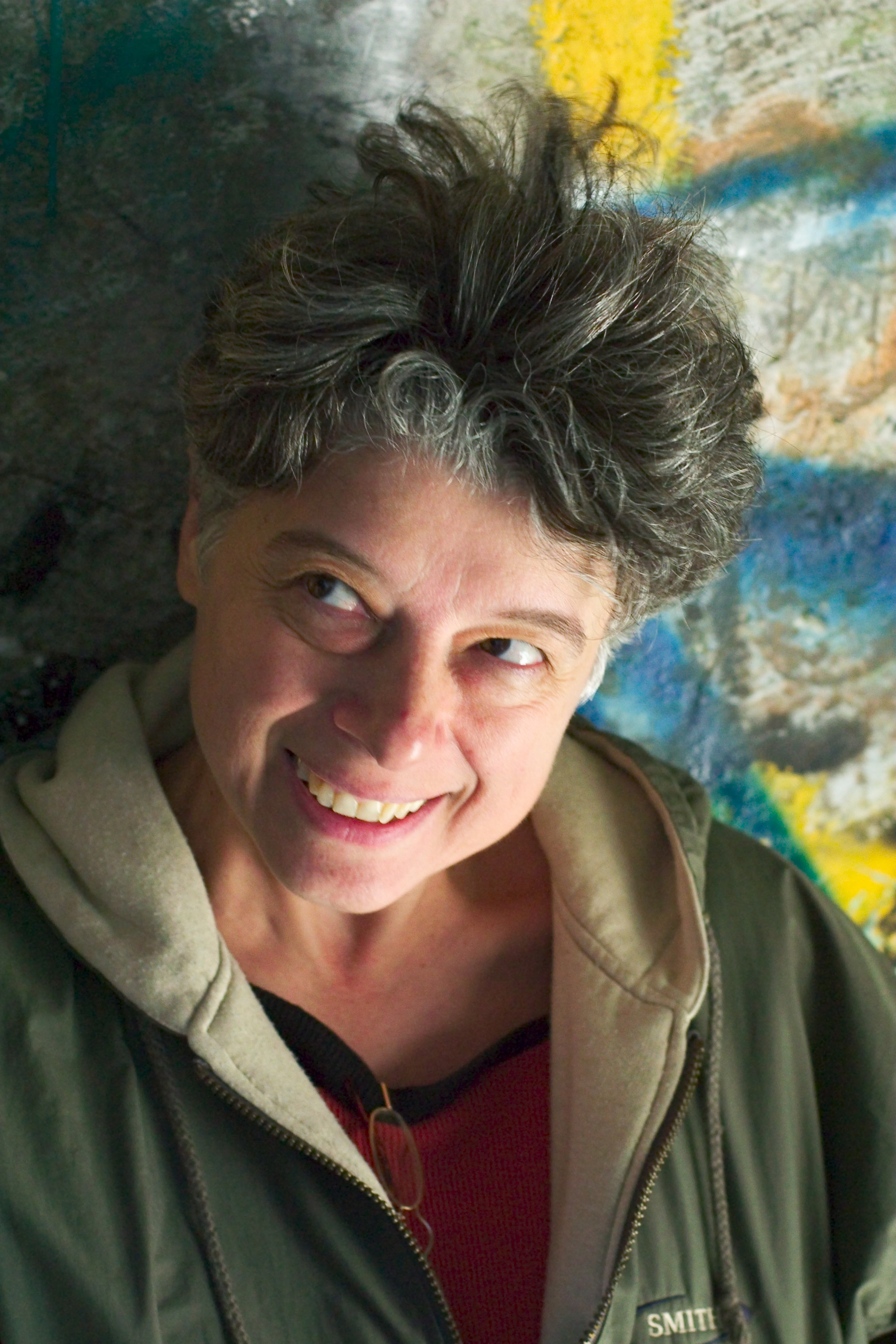
- Education: University of Bucharest; Rutgers University
- Known for: Work on kinematics, structural rigidity
- Scientific career
- Fields: Computer Science, Mathematics
- Workplaces: Smith College
- Theses: Grammatical inference (1994); Some positive and negative results in computational geometry (1994)
- Doctoral advisors: Solomon Marcus; William L. Steiger

Ileana Streinu is a Romanian-American computer scientist and mathematician, the Charles N. Clark Professor of Computer Science and Mathematics at Smith College in Massachusetts. She is known for her research in computational geometry, and in particular for her work on kinematics and structural rigidity.

== Biography ==
Streinu did her undergraduate studies at the University of Bucharest in Romania. She earned two doctorates in 1994, one in mathematics and computer science from the University of Bucharest under the supervision of Solomon Marcus and one in computer science from Rutgers University under the supervision of William L. Steiger. She joined the Smith computer science department in 1994, was given a joint appointment in mathematics in 2005, and became the Charles N. Clark Professor in 2009. She also holds an adjunct professorship in the computer science department at the University of Massachusetts Amherst.

At Smith, Streinu is director of the Biomathematical Sciences Concentration and has been the co-PI on a million-dollar grant shared between four schools to support this activity.

== Awards and honors ==
In 2006, Streinu won the Grigore Moisil Award of the Romanian Academy for her work with Ciprian Borcea using complex algebraic geometry to show that every minimally rigid graph with fixed edge lengths has at most 4^{n} different embeddings into the Euclidean plane, where n denotes the number of distinct vertices of the graph.

In 2010, Streinu won the David P. Robbins Prize of the American Mathematical Society for her combinatorial solution to the carpenter's rule problem. In this problem, one is given an arbitrary simple polygon with flexible vertices and rigid edges, and must show that it can be manipulated into a convex shape without ever introducing any self-crossings. Streinu's solution augments the input to form a pointed pseudotriangulation, removes one convex hull edge from this graph, and shows that this edge removal provides a single degree of freedom allowing the polygon to be made more convex one step at a time.

In 2012 she became a fellow of the American Mathematical Society.

== Selected publications ==
- Borcea, Ciprian; Streinu, Ileana (2004), "The number of embeddings of minimally rigid graphs", Discrete and Computational Geometry, 31 (2): 287–303, arXiv:math/0207126, doi:10.1007/s00454-003-2902-0, MR 2060642, S2CID 47499620.
- Streinu, Ileana (2005), "Pseudo-triangulations, rigidity and motion planning", Discrete and Computational Geometry, 34 (4): 587–635, doi:10.1007/s00454-005-1184-0, MR 2173930.
