= Carpenter's rule problem =

On continuous motion of a simple polygon to convex

The carpenter's rule problem is a discrete geometry problem, which can be stated in the following manner: Can a simple planar polygon be moved continuously to a position where all its vertices are in convex position, so that the edge lengths and simplicity are preserved along the way? A closely related problem is to show that any non-self-crossing polygonal chain can be straightened, again by a continuous transformation that preserves edge distances and avoids crossings.

Both problems were successfully solved by Connelly, Demaine & Rote (2003).

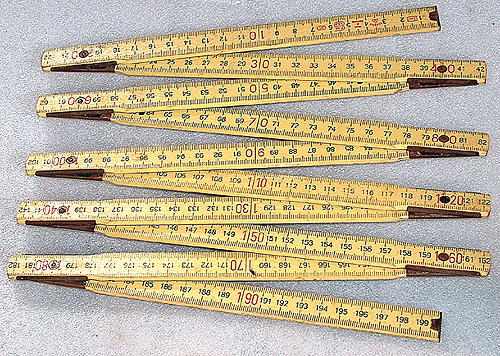
A jointed ruler

The problem is named after the multiple-jointed wooden rulers popular among carpenters in the 19th and early 20th centuries before improvements to metal tape measures made them obsolete.

== Combinatorial proof ==
Subsequently, to their work, Ileana Streinu provided a simplified combinatorial proof formulated in the terminology of robot arm motion planning. Both the original proof and Streinu's proof work by finding non-expansive motions of the input, continuous transformations such that no two points ever move towards each other. Streinu's version of the proof adds edges to the input to form a pointed pseudotriangulation, removes one added convex hull edge from this graph, and shows that the remaining graph has a one-parameter family of motions in which all distances are nondecreasing. By repeatedly applying such motions, one eventually reaches a state in which no further expansive motions are possible, which can only happen when the input has been straightened or convexified.

Streinu & Whiteley (2005) provide an application of this result to the mathematics of paper folding: they describe how to fold any single-vertex origami shape using only simple non-self-intersecting motions of the paper. Essentially, this folding process is a time-reversed version of the problem of convexifying a polygon of length smaller than π, but on the surface of a sphere rather than in the Euclidean plane. This result was extended by Panina & Streinu (2010) for spherical polygons of edge length smaller than 2π.

== Generalization ==
John Pardon (2009) generalized the Carpenter's rule problem to rectifiable curves. He showed that every rectifiable Jordan curve can be made convex, without increasing its length and without decreasing the distance between any pair of points. This research, performed while he was still a high school student, won the second-place prize for Pardon in the 2007 Intel Science Talent Search (Cunningham 2007).

== See also ==
- Curve-shortening flow, a continuous transformation of a closed curve in the plane that eventually convexifies it
