= Iyōzō Fujita =

- 藤田 怡与蔵
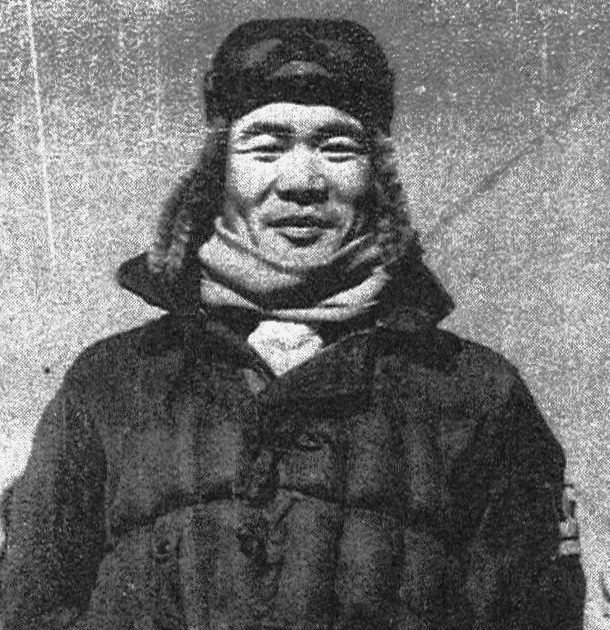
- Born: November 2, 1917; Shandong, China
- Died: December 1, 2006 (aged 89); Japan
- Military career
- Allegiance: Empire of Japan
- Branch: Imperial Japanese Navy Air Service (IJN)
- Service years: 1938–1945
- Rank: Lieutenant Commander
- Units: Sōryū; Hiyō; 301st Air group 341st Air group
- Conflicts: World War II; Attack on Pearl Harbor; Attack on Darwin; Indian Ocean Raid; Battle of Midway; Solomon Islands Campaign

Iyōzō Fujita (藤田 怡与蔵, Fujita Iyōzō; 2 November 1917 – 1 December 2006) was an officer and ace fighter pilot in the Imperial Japanese Navy (IJN) during the Pacific War. He was officially credited with destroying 13 enemy aircraft. During the Battle of Midway alone, he claimed ten aircraft shot down in one day (seven of which were shared).

== Early career ==
Iyōzō Fujita attended Kitsuki High School in Ōita Prefecture and then enrolled in Imperial Japanese Navy Academy. He graduated from the 66th class in September 1938. He was accepted for the navy pilot training program and completed it in June 1940. In September 1941 he was assigned to fighter squadron aboard the carrier Sōryū.

== Pacific War ==
On 7 December 1941, Lieutenant (jg) Fujita participated in the Attack on Pearl Harbor, where he was assigned as a section leader (Shōtaichō) of fighter escort in the second wave. while strafing Kaneohe Airfield, his unit commander (Buntaichō), Lieutenant Fusata Iida, was shot down by anti-aircraft fire and Fujita took command over the remaining fighters and headed for Kaena Point, which was the rendezvous for the return to the carriers. On the way, they encountered a formation of Curtiss P-36 Hawk fighters and in the ensuing dogfight, Fujita claimed to shoot down one of them. However, his own fighter was hit and he barely made it back to the carriers. Upon returning to Japan, he was promoted to full Lieutenant. In February 1942, he participated in the Bombing of Darwin. During the Indian Ocean Raid on 5 April, he and Petty Officer Kaname Harada attacked six British Fairey Fulmar and each claimed one of them shot down.

In June 1942, Lieutenant Fujita took part in the Battle of Midway, where he was assigned to Combat Air Patrol (CAP) to protect the carriers. He and his group intercepted the first wave of Grumman TBF Avenger and Martin B-26 Marauder bombers from Midway Island, where he claimed three bombers shot down (two of them were shared). He and his section landed on the carrier for a quick rearming and refuelling and took off to intercept the second wave from Midway Island, which consisted of Douglas SBD Dauntless dive bombers led by Major Lofton R. Henderson. He and his section made another landing and then joined with a CAP group led by Lieutenant Ayao Shirane. They intercepted the successive attacks of the Douglas TBD Devastator torpedo bombers from USS Enterprise (VT-6) and from USS Yorktown (VT-3), the latter were escorted by Grumman F4F Wildcat fighters of VF-3, led by Lieutenant Commander Jimmy Thach. In the air combat, Fujita managed to claim four torpedo-bombers (three shared) and three fighters (two shared) shot down. When he approached the carrier for another landing, he was hit by a friendly anti-aircraft fire that ignited his fuel tank. He had to bail out at 200 meters but survived the landing in the water and was picked up by the destroyer Nowaki. However, during the final engagement, Sōryū was attacked and mortally damaged by the dive bombers from Yorktown (VB-3).

After the battle of Midway, Lieutenant Fujita was assigned to the carrier Hiyō as a Buntaichō. In October 1942, the carrier was sent to the Solomon Islands, however, it soon experienced a mechanical failure and its air group was transferred to a land base at Buin through Rabaul. The group operated from Buin and made frequent missions against Guadalcanal until mid-December. During this time, Lieutenant Fujita claimed two aircraft shot down. In April 1943, he was sent to Rabaul to take part in the Operation I-Go. Following the operation, he was then transferred to the Tsuiki Air group in June.

In November he was appointed as squadron leader (Hikōtaichō) of the newly formed 301st Air group. Between June and July 1944 his unit took part in the air defence of Iwo Jima. In July he was transferred to unit S402, which was equipped with the new Kawanishi N1K fighters. In October, the S402 was consolidated into 341st Air Group and participated in the air battles off Taiwan. The unit lost much of its strength in intense air battles over the Philippines and was finally withdrawn to Japan in January 1945.

== Later career ==
Fujita survived the war. After the war, he became a commercial pilot for Japan Air Lines (1945–1977). He died on 1 December 2006.

== Sources ==
- Hata, Ikuhiko; Izawa, Yasuho; Shores, Christopher (2011). Japanese Naval Air Force Fighter Units and their aces, 1932-1945. London, UK: Grub Street. ISBN 9781906502843.
- Ledet, Michel (January 2002). "Iyozoh Fujita: as et gentleman" [Iyozoh Fujia: Ace and Gentleman]. Avions: Toute l'Aéronautique et son histoire (in French) (106): 8–12. ISSN 1243-8650.
- Lundstrom, John B. (2005a). The First Team: Pacific Naval Air Combat from Pearl Harbor to Midway (New ed.). Annapolis, Maryland: Naval Institute Press. ISBN 1-59114-471-X.
- Lundstrom, John B. (2005b). First Team and the Guadalcanal Campaign: Naval Fighter Combat from August to November 1942 (New ed.). Annapolis, Maryland: Naval Institute Press. ISBN 1-59114-472-8.
- Parshall, Jonathan; Tully, Anthony (2005). Shattered Sword: The Untold Story of the Battle of Midway. Dulles, Virginia: Potomac Books. ISBN 1-57488-923-0.
- Millman, Nicholas (2019). A6M Zero-sen Aces 1940-42. Aircraft of the Aces #137. Osprey Publishing. ISBN 978-1472821447.

Combat reports

- 海軍大臣官房. 飛鷹飛行機隊戦闘行動調書 (Report). Japan Center for Asian Historical Records.
- 海軍大臣官房. 蒼龍飛行機隊戦闘行動調書 (Report). Japan Center for Asian Historical Records.
