= Bug Wars =

Episode in the history of origami

The Bug Wars were origami contests among members of the Origami Detectives (Tanteidan in Japanese) which started when one member made a bug, a horned beetle with outspread wings, from a single sheet of paper: this design provoked other members to design more complex origami in the shape of bugs, such as wasps and praying mantises.

== Impact on origami design ==
Independent coverage describes the Bug Wars as a 1990s "golden age of insects" in which origami artists used mathematical design methods to create increasingly realistic insect models, progressing from six-legged insects to ones with extended wings and distinct forewings and hindwings. Examples of the mathematical design methods associated with that period include circle-river packing and Lang's TreeMaker software.

The Bug Wars motivated computational origamists to build models and algorithms to add complexity in a more systematic manner. The majority of the origamists in the Origami Detectives did not use these novel computational tools in the creation of their own origami art. Since the Bug Wars, there have been a collection of books, instruction guides, academic papers, and origami art that have been inspired by the prolonged event. Each year, the Origami Tanteidan Convention in Japan hosts conventions that feature the work of some of the world's most renowned origami artists. Along with the convention, Tanteidan Convention Books are released each year with exclusive folding instructions from different designers. An Origami Tanteidan Magazine is released more frequently (6 times a year) and includes diagrams for 3 to 5 models, a crease pattern challenge, and other related articles in each issue. Recent content is published both in English and Japanese.
