= International Society for the Interdisciplinary Study of Symmetry =

The International Symmetry Society ("International Society for the Interdisciplinary Study of Symmetry"; abbreviated name SIS) is an international non-governmental, non-profit organization registered in Hungary (Budapest, Tisza u. 7, H-1029). Its main objectives are:

1. to bring together artists and scientists, educators and students devoted to, or interested in, the research and understanding of the concept and application of symmetry (asymmetry, dissymmetry);
2. to provide regular information to the general public about events in symmetry studies;
3. to ensure a regular forum (including the organization of symposia and the publication of a periodical) for all those interested in symmetry studies.

The topic was first introduced by Russian and Polish scholars. Then in 1952, Hermann Weyl published his fascinating book Symmetry, which was later translated into 10 languages. Since then, it has become an attractive subject of research in various fields. A variety of manifestations of the principle of symmetry in sculpture, painting, architecture, ornament, and design, as well as in organic and inorganic nature, have been revealed; the philosophical and mathematical significance of this principle has been explored. During the 1980s, the discussions concerning the nature of the world, whether it was essentially probabilistic or naturally geometric, revived the interest of researchers in the topic. The intellectual atmosphere of this period facilitated the idea of establishing a new institution devoted to studying all forms of complexity, patterns of symmetry, and orderly structures that pervade science, nature, and society. This ultimately led to the establishment of the International Society for the Interdisciplinary Study of Symmetry.

The Society's community comprises several branches of science and art, while symmetry studies have gained the rank of an individual interdisciplinary field in the judgement of the scientific community. The Society has members on over 40 countries on all continents.

The Society was founded in 1989 following a successful international meeting in Budapest. It has operated continuously since its foundation, publishing printed and web journals and hosting an International Congress and Exhibition entitled Symmetry: Art and Science every three years:

- 1989 in Budapest, Hungary
- 1992 in Hiroshima, Japan
- 1995 in Washington DC, US
- 1998 in Haifa, Israel
- 2001 in Sydney, Australia
- 2004 in Tihany, Hungary
- 2007 in Buenos Aires, Argentina
- 2010 in Gmünd, Austria
- 2013 in Hersonissos, Crete, Greece
- 2016 in Adelaide, Australia
- 2019 in Kanazawa, Japan
- 2022 in Porto, Portugal
- 2025 in Kolymvari, Crete, Greece

Interim, full conferences have been held in

- Tsukuba Science City (co-organized with Katachi no kagaku kai, Japan), 1994 and 1998
- Brussels (2002)
- Lviv [Lemberg] (2008)
- Kraków and Wroclaw (2008).

A new series of conferences under the general heading Logics of Image was launched in 2013 and is planned to take place every two years. This series is co-organised with the Research Group on Universal Logic:

- ISSC 2016: Logics of Image - Visualization, Iconicity, Imagination and Human Creativity, in Santorini, Greece
- ISSC 2018: Logics of Image - Visual Learning, Logic and Philosophy of Form in East and West, in Crete, Greece

The President of the International Society for the Interdisciplinary Study of Symmetry is Dénes Nagy. The Society is governed by several special Boards and Committees. The International Advisory Board consists of:

- Rima Ajlouni (USA)
- Alireza Behnejad (UK),
- Beth Cardier (Australia),
- Oleh Bodnar (Ukraine),
- Liu Dun (China),
- Eugene Katz (Israel),
- Patricia Muñoz (Argentina, representing SEMA),
- Janusz Rębielak (Poland),
- Dmitry Weise (Russia).

Among the Honorary Members of the Society are:

- Carol Bier (USA)
- Jürgen Bokowski (Germany)
- Michael Burt (Israel)
- Istvan Hargittai (Hungary)
- Peter Klein (Germany)
- Koryo Miura (Japan)
- Tohru Ogawa (Japan)
- Werner Schulze (Austria)
- Caspar Schwabe (Switzerland)
- Dan Shechtman (Israel)
- Ryuji Takaki (Japan)

Honorary Members of the Society (passed away)

- Johann Jakob Burckhardt (Switzerland)
- Harold S. M. Coxeter (Canada)
- Donald Crowe (USA)
- Victor A. Frank-Kamenetsky (Russia)
- Heinrich Heesch (Germany)
- William Huff (USA)
- Kodi Husimi (Japan)
- Michael Longuet-Higgins (UK and USA)
- Yuval Ne’eman (Israel)
- Ilarion I. Shafranovskii (Russia)
- Cyril Smith (USA)
- Eugene P. Wigner (USA)
