= Kōryō Miura =

Japanese astrophysicist, inventor, and origamist

Kōryō Miura (Japanese: 三浦 公亮, born 1930) is a Japanese astrophysicist, inventor, and origamist known for the Miura fold. He is a professor emeritus at the University of Tokyo and at the Institute of Space and Astronautical Science.

== Miura fold ==
The Miura fold

In the 1970s, Miura began working with Masamori Sakamaki on deployable surfaces, developing what became known as the Miura fold. This is a method of rigidly folding a flat surface, using a crease pattern subdividing the surface into parallelograms, so that it fits into a much smaller volume. Miura originally intended this method to be used in spacecraft for deployable membranes such as solar panel arrays, but it has since found many other applications including in cartography, surgical devices, flat-foldable furniture, and electrical storage.

== Book ==
With Sergio Pellegrino of Caltech, Miura is the author of the book Forms and Concepts for Lightweight Structures (Cambridge University Press, 2020).

== Recognition ==
Miura was named an honorary member of the International Association for Shell and Spatial Structures (IASS) in 2009, "for the invention of Miura-ori and many original developments in the field of space structures". He is also an honorary member of the International Society for the Interdisciplinary Study of Symmetry (SIS). His work with Tomohiro Tachi on flexible polyhedra derived from the Miura fold won the 2013 Tsuboi Award of the IASS.
