= RNA origami =

Nanoscale folding of RNA

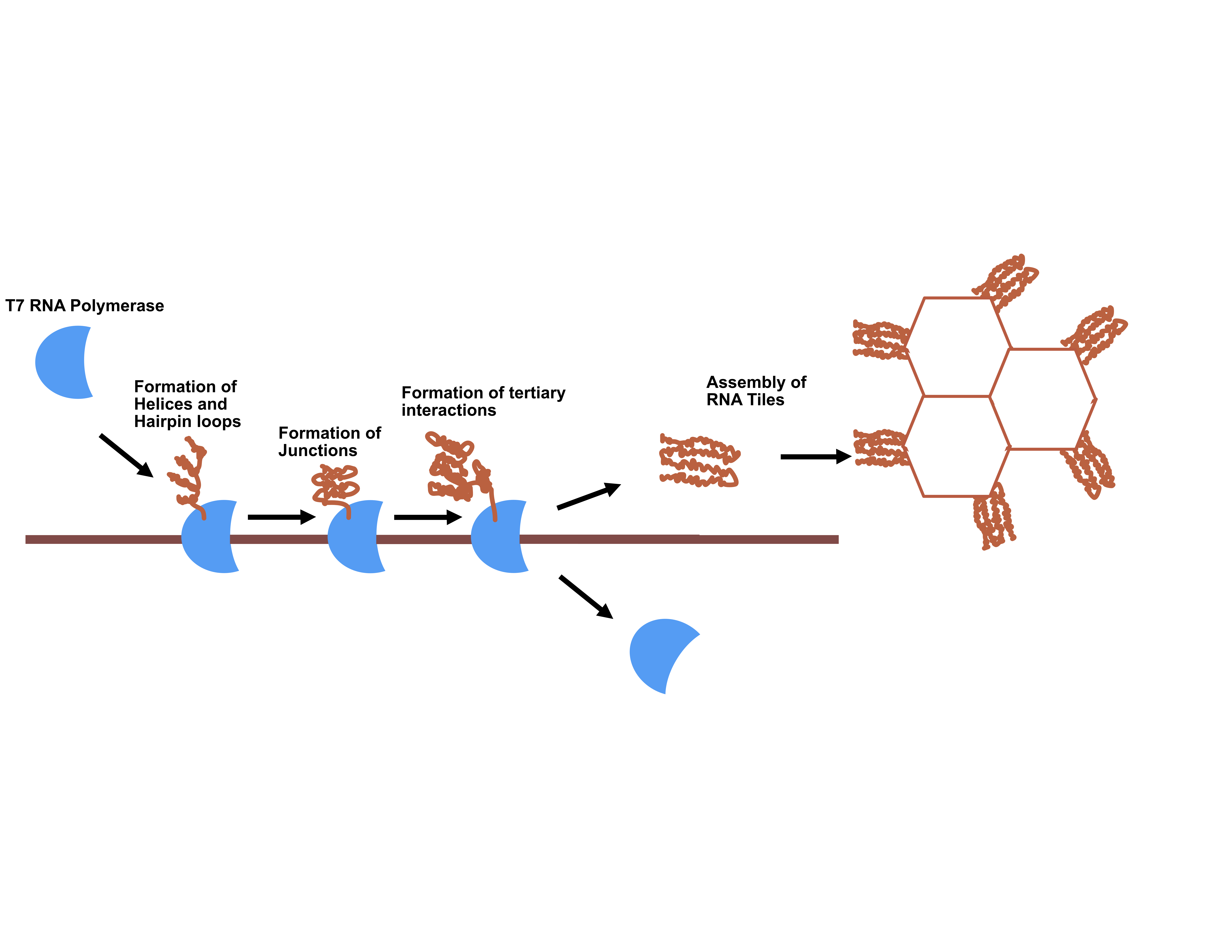
RNA origami mechanism.

RNA origami is the nanoscale folding of RNA, enabling the RNA to create particular shapes to organize these molecules. It is a new method that was developed by researchers from Aarhus University and California Institute of Technology. RNA origami is synthesized by enzymes that fold RNA into particular shapes. The folding of the RNA occurs in living cells under natural conditions. RNA origami is represented as a DNA gene, which within cells can be transcribed into RNA by RNA polymerase. Many computer algorithms are present to help with RNA folding, but none can fully predict the folding of RNA of a singular sequence.

== Overview ==
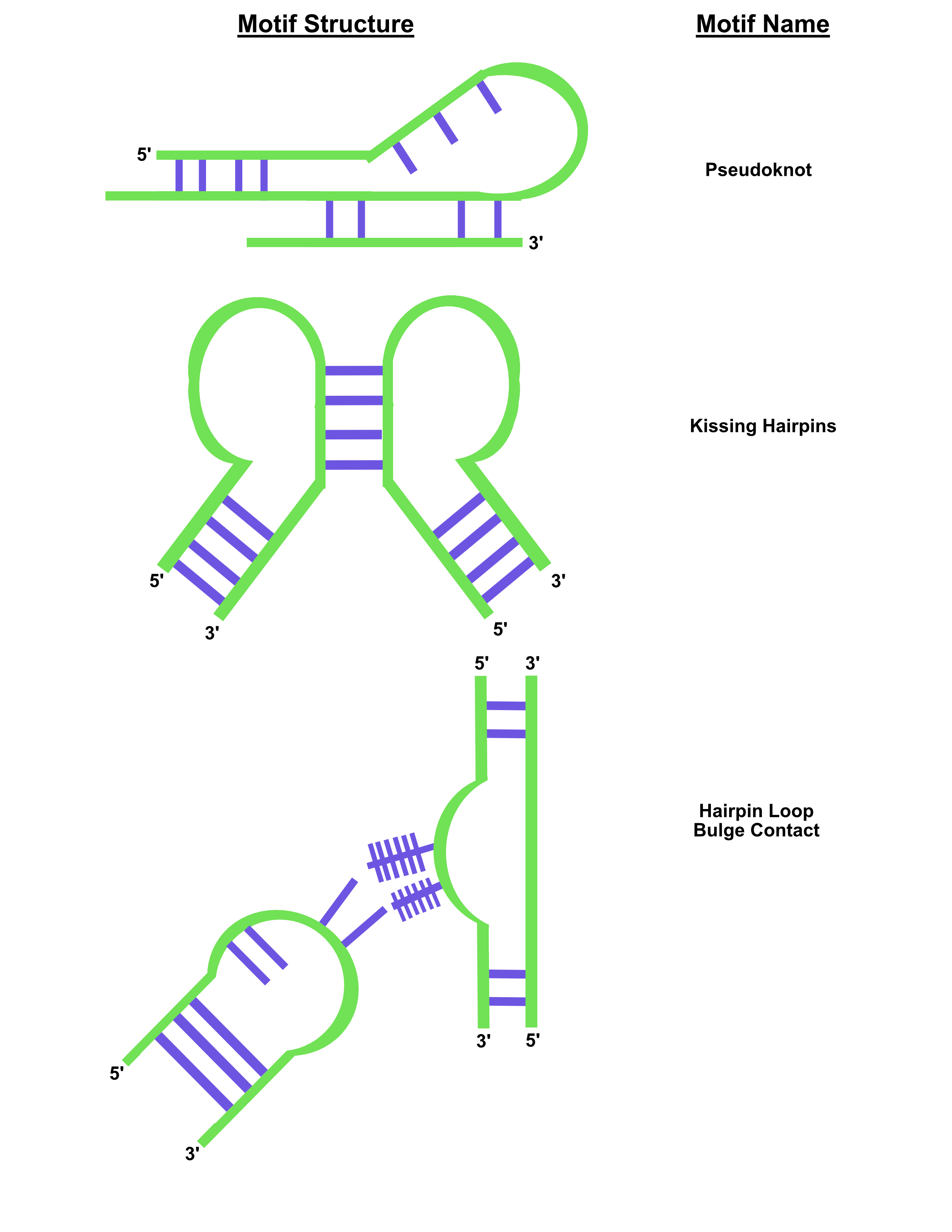
RNA adapted motifs

In nucleic acids nanotechnology, artificial nucleic acids are designed to form molecular components that can self-assemble into stable structures for use ranging from targeted drug delivery to programmable biomaterials. DNA nanotechnology uses DNA motifs to build target shapes and arrangements. It has been used in a variety of situations, including nanorobotics, algorithmic arrays, and sensor applications. The future of DNA nanotechnology is filled with possibilities for applications.

The success of DNA nanotechnology has allowed designers to develop RNA nanotechnology as a growing discipline. RNA nanotechnology combines the simplistic design and manipulation characteristic of DNA, with the additional flexibility in structure and diversity in function similar to that of proteins. RNA's versatility in structure and function, favorable in vivo attributes, and bottom-up self-assembly is an ideal avenue for developing biomaterial and nanoparticle drug delivery. Several techniques were developed to construct these RNA nanoparticles, including RNA cubic scaffold, templated and non-templated assembly, and RNA origami.

The first work in RNA origami appeared in Science, published by Ebbe S. Andersen of Aarhus University. Researchers at Aarhus University used various 3D models and computer software to design individual RNA origami. Once encoded as a synthetic DNA gene, adding RNA polymerase resulted in the formation of RNA origami. Observation of RNA was primarily done through atomic force microscopy, a technique that allows researchers to look at molecules a thousand times closer than would normally be possible with a conventional light microscope. They were able to form honeycomb shapes, but determined other shapes are also possible.

Cody Geary, a scholar in the field of RNA origami, described the uniqueness of the method of RNA origami. He stated that its folding recipe is encoded in the molecule itself, and determine by its sequence. The sequence gives the RNA origami both its final shape and movements of the structure as it folds. The primary challenge associated with RNA origami stems from the fact RNA folds on its own and can thus easily tangle itself.

=== Computer-aided design ===
Computer-aided design of the RNA origami structure requires three main processes; creating the 3D model, writing the 2D structure, and designing the sequence. First, a 3D model is constructed using tertiary motifs from existing databases. This is necessary to ensure the created structure has feasible geometry and strain. The next process is creating the 2D structure describing the strand path and base pairs from the 3D model. This 2D blueprint introduces sequence constraints, creating primary, secondary, and tertiary motifs. The final step is designing sequences compatible with designed structure. Design algorithms can be used to create sequences that can fold into various structures.

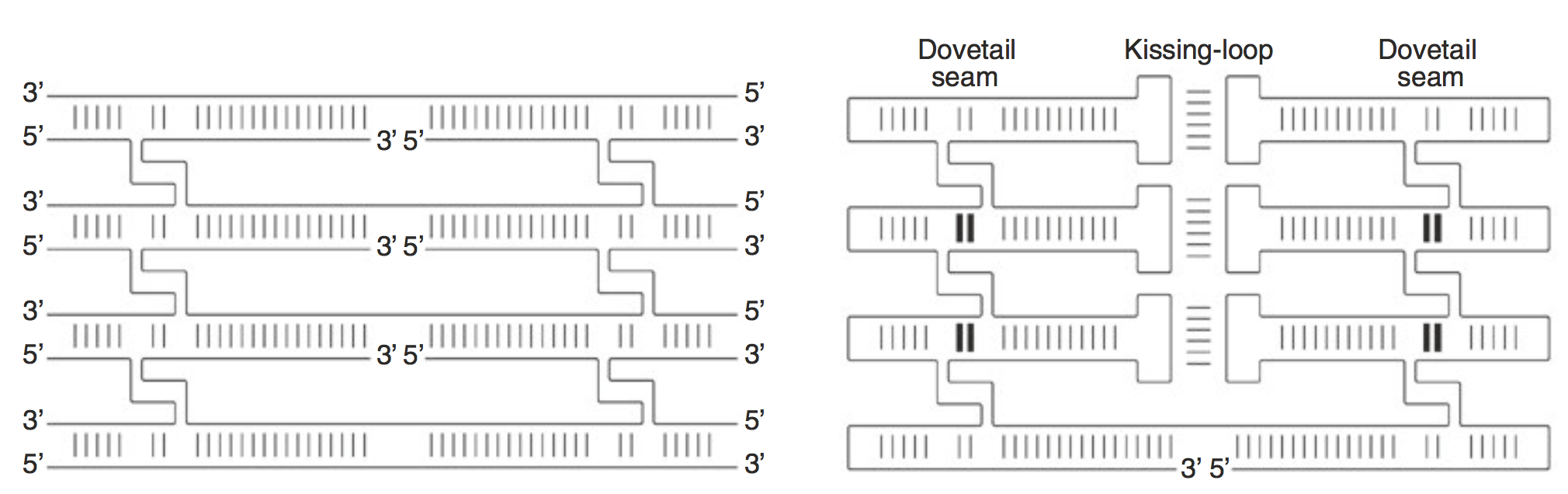
DNA and RNA origami double cross over building block comparison. The left panel is the blueprint design of a multi-stranded DX used commonly in DNA origami. The right panel is the design of the single stranded DX by inserting hairpins, kissing loops, and dovetail seam motif.

=== The double crossover (DX) ===
To produce a desired shape, the RNA origami method uses double-crossovers (DX) to arrange the RNA helices in parallel to each other to form a building block. While DNA origami requires the construction of DNA molecules from multiple strands, researchers were able to devise a method in making DX molecules from only one strand for RNA. This was done through adding hairpin motifs to the edges and kissing-loop complexes on internal helices. The addition of more DNA molecules on top of one another creates a junction known as the dovetail seam. This dovetail seam has base pairs that cross between adjacent junctions; thus, the structural seam along the junction becomes sequence-specific. An important aspect of these folding interactions is its folding; the order that interactions form can potentially create a situation in which one interaction blocks another, creating a knot. Because the kissing-loop interactions and dovetail interactions are a half-turn or shorter, they do not create these topological issues.

== Comparison with DNA origami ==
RNA and DNA nanostructures are used for the organization and coordination of important molecular processes. However, there exist several distinct differences between the fundamental structure and applications between the two. Although inspired by the DNA origami techniques established by Paul Rothemund, the process for RNA origami is vastly different. RNA origami is a much newer process than DNA origami; DNA origami has been studied for approximately a decade now, while the study of RNA origami has only recently begun.

In contrast to DNA origami, which involves chemically synthesizing the DNA strands and arranging the strands to form any shape desired with the aid of "staple strands", RNA origami is made by enzymes and subsequently folds into pre-rendered shapes. RNA is able to fold into unique ways in complex structures due to a number of secondary structural motifs, such as conserved motifs and short structural elements. A major determinant for RNA topology is the secondary-structure interaction, which include motifs such as pseudoknots and kissing loops, adjacent helices stacking on one another, hairpin loops with bulge content, and coaxial stacks. This is largely a result of four different nucleotides: adenine (A), cytosine (C), guanine (G) and uracil (U), and ability to form non-canonical base pairs.

There also exist more complex and longer-range RNA tertiary interactions. DNA are unable to forms these tertiary motifs and thereby cannot match the functional capacity of RNA in performing more versatile tasks. RNA molecules that are correctly folded can serve as enzymes, due to positioning metal ions at their active sites; this gives the molecules a diverse array of catalytic abilities. Because of this relationship to enzymes, RNA structures can potentially be grown within living cells and used to organize cellular enzymes into distinct groups.

Additionally, the DNA origami's molecular breakup is not easily incorporated into the genetic material of an organism. However, RNA origami is capable of being written directly as a DNA gene and transcribed using RNA polymerase. Therefore, while DNA origami requires expensive culturing outside of a cell, RNA origami can be produced in mass, cheap quantities directly within cells just by growing bacteria. The feasibility and cost effectiveness of manufacturing RNA in living cells and combined with the extra functionality of RNA structure is promising for the development of RNA origami.

== Applications ==
RNA origami is a new concept and has great potential for applications in nanomedicine and synthetic biology. The method was developed to allow new creations of large RNA nanostructures that create defined scaffolds for combining RNA based functionalities. Because of the infancy of RNA origami, many of its potential applications are still in the process of discovery. Its structures are able to provide a stable basis to allow functionality for RNA components. These structures include riboswitches, ribozymes, interaction sites, and aptamers. Aptamer structures allow the binding of small molecules which gives possibilities for construction of future RNA based nanodevices. RNA origami is further useful in areas such as cell recognition and binding for diagnosis. Additionally, targeted delivery and blood-brain barrier passing have been studied. Perhaps the most important future application for RNA origami is building scaffolds to arrange other microscopic proteins and allow them to work with one another.

=== Artificial Cytoskeletons and Synthetic Cells ===
Using RNA origami techniques, researchers have created nanotubular structures that replicate the cytoskeleton, an important element of living cells. These artificial cytoskeletal structures offer essential structural stability and organization, key to developing artificial cells. The technology does away with protein synthesis, thus streamlining synthetic cellular entity assembly. The ability to design and manipulate these structures raises new questions in synthetic biology, such as creating artificial cells for use in medical and industrial contexts.
