= Wilhelm Ahrens =

German officer and Knight's Cross recipient (1872–1927)

Wilhelm Ahrens (3 March 1872 – 23 May 1927) was a German mathematician and writer on recreational mathematics.

== Biography ==
Ahrens was born in Lübz at the Elde in Mecklenburg and studied from 1890 to 1897 at the University of Rostock, Humboldt University of Berlin, and the University of Freiburg. In 1895 at the University of Rostock he received his Promotion (Ph.D.), summa cum laude, under the supervision of Otto Staude with dissertation entitled Über eine Gattung n-fach periodischer Functionen von n reellen Veränderlichen. From 1895 to 1896 he taught at the German school in Antwerp and then studied another semester under Sophus Lie in Leipzig. In 1897 Ahrens was a teacher in Magdeburg at the Baugewerkeschule, from 1901 at the engineering school. Inspired by Sophus Lie, he wrote "On transformation groups, all of whose subgroups are invariant" (Hamburger Math Society Vol 4, 1902).

He worked a lot on the history of mathematics and mathematical games (recreational mathematics), about which he wrote a great work and also contributed to the Encyclopedia of mathematical sciences. His predecessors were the great Jacques Ozanam in France, where the number theorist Édouard Lucas (1842–1891) in the 19th century wrote similar books, and Walter William Rouse Ball (1850–1925) in England (Mathematical recreations and essays 1892), Sam Loyd (1841–1901) in the U.S. and Henry Dudeney (1857–1930) in England. In this sense Martin Gardner (1914-2010) and Ian Stewart, the editor of the math column in Scientific American, might be regarded as his successors. He also wrote a book of quotations and anecdotes about mathematicians. He was the author of numerous journal articles.

== Scherz und Ernst in der Mathematik ==
According to R. C. Archibald:

Ahrens's Scherz und Ernst in der Mathematik ... is strictly a book of quotations; secondly, each quotation is invariably given in the original language, spoken or written; thirdly, exact bibliographical data are provided for all quotations; fourthly, the quotations follow one another consecutively from pages 1 to 495 without grouping under subject headings. A 24-page detailed index of subjects and authors provides the means for rapid orientation. Names of living mathematicians are rarely met with, but references to the "old masters" such as Abel, Euclid, Euler, Gauss, Helmholtz, Lagrange, Laplace, Steiner, and Weierstrass, are very numerous.
The whole constitutes a most admirable piece of work and must long serve as a desirable model for works of like nature.

== Bibliography ==
- Mathematische Unterhaltungen und Spiele [Mathematical Recreations and Games], 1901
- Mathematische Spiele [Mathematical Games], 1902
- Scherz und Ernst in der Mathematik; geflügelte und ungeflügelte Worte [Fun and seriousness in mathematics: well-known and less well-known words], 1904. Scherz und Ernst in der Mathematik is available for free viewing and download at the Internet Archive; 2002 Auflage
- Gelehrten-Anekdoten [Scholarly anecdotes], 1911
- Mathematiker-Anekdoten [Anecdotes of Mathematicians], 1916; Zweite, stark veränderte Auflage (2nd revised edition) 1920
