= Humiaki Huzita =

- 藤田文章
- Born: 1924; Japan
- Died: March 26, 2005 (aged 80–81); Italy
- Other name: Humi
- Education: University of Padua (Università di Padova)
- Known for: Huzita–Hatori axioms
- Scientific career
- Fields: Origami Physics Mathematics Geometry

Humiaki Huzita (Japanese: 藤田文章, Hepburn romanization: Fujita Fumiaki) was a Japanese-born mathematician and origami artist who later became an Italian citizen. He was also a geologist and a physicist who focuses specifically on nuclear physics. Huzita is best known for formulating the first six Huzita–Hatori axioms, which are rules associated with origami, the mathematics behind it, and the operations that form when folding a paper.

== Biography and education ==
Humiaki Huzita was born in 1924 in Japan. After his basic education, he moved to Italy to attend the University of Padua. Here he studied nuclear physics and was eventually granted Italian citizenship. Though because of Japan's nationality laws, which do not allow dual citizenship, he was unable to live permanently in Japan following his retirement. Huzita, having lived in Japan and Italy, spoke both Japanese and Italian, however, he also spoke proficient English. This was advantageous for him and his cause, allowing him to spread his knowledge of origami and the geometry and mathematics behind it to a larger range of people.

== Scientific career and contributions ==
Apart from origami, Humiaki Huzita studied nuclear physics. He has several publications on these topics. Some examples include the article "On the Analysis of the Slow Particles Emitted from Cosmic-Ray Stars" written with Shigeo Nakagawa, Eiji Tamai, and Kiyoaki Okudaira. This article discusses the measured diameter of the six unique tracks of stars ending in the G5 emulsion and the insights that this information gives. Another article on the topic of physics written by Humiaki Huzita is "Symmetry and Symmetry Breaking in Boats, its Propulsion Methods and Navigation Techniques." This article focusses on how symmetry breaking, or asymmetry, can sometimes be superior to symmetry even when unexpected, using boats as an example. One final example of an article by Huzita regarding nuclear physics is "Evidence of Non-Zero Mass Features for the Neutrinos Emitted at Supernova LMC-'87A."

Huzita was influential in the development of origami in Italy and internationally. For instance, Huzita invited Tomoko Fuse to the 1987 Italian Origami Society (Centro Diffusione Origami) convention in Padua because he noticed her talent, skill, and different origami techniques. Through her attendance at the convention, she began to gain worldwide recognition in the origami community. Huzita also organized several conventions and meetings between origami artists and mathematicians. Huzita arranged "The First International Meeting of Origami Science and Technology” at the Casa di Ludovico Ariosto in Ferrara, Italy. This meeting had many origami mathematicians and artists from around the world and bridged the gap between them. On account of Huzita's pioneering idea for "The First International Meeting of Origami Science and Technology,” many more have followed since then. In 1994, a second conference was held in Otsu, Japan, followed by one in Asilomar, California, in 2001; Pasadena, California, in 2006; Singapore in 2010; and Tokyo, Japan, in 2014.

== Death ==
Humiaki Huzita died on March 26, 2005, due to an automobile accident.
