= Margherita Piazzola Beloch =

Italian mathematician (1879–1976)

Margherita Piazzola Beloch (née Beloch; 12 July 1879 – 28 September 1976) was an Italian mathematician who worked in algebraic geometry, algebraic topology and photogrammetry.

== Biography ==
Beloch, born in Frascati, was the daughter of the German historian Karl Julius Beloch, who taught ancient history for 50 years at Sapienza University of Rome, and American Bella Bailey (daughter of Gamaliel Bailey).

Beloch studied mathematics at the Sapienza University of Rome and wrote her undergraduate thesis under the supervision of Guido Castelnuovo. She received her degree in 1908 with Laude and dignità di stampa, which means that her work was worthy of publication, and in fact her thesis Sulle trasformazioni birazionali nello spazio (On Birational Transformations in Space) was published in the Annali di Matematica Pura ed Applicata.

Castelnuovo was very impressed with her talent and offered her the position of assistant which Beloch took and held until 1919, when she moved to Pavia. In 1920 she moved to Palermo to work under Michele De Franchis, an important figure of the Italian school of algebraic geometry at the time.

In 1924, Beloch completed her libera docenza (a degree that at that time had to be obtained before one could become a professor), and three years later she became a full professor at the University of Ferrara, where she taught until her retirement (1955). She died in Rome in 1976.

== Scientific work ==
Her main scientific interests were in algebraic geometry, algebraic topology and photogrammetry.

After her thesis, she worked on the classification of algebraic surfaces by studying the configurations of lines that could lie on surfaces. The next step was to study rational curves lying on surfaces and in this framework Beloch obtained the following important result: "Hyperelliptic surfaces of rank 2 are characterised by having 16 rational curves."

Beloch also made contributions to the theory of skew algebraic curves. She continued working on topological properties of algebraic curves either planar or lying on ruled or cubic surfaces for most of her life, writing about a dozen papers on these subjects.

Around 1940 Beloch become more and more interested in photogrammetry and the application of mathematics, and in particular algebraic geometry, to it. She is also known for her contribution to the mathematics of paper folding: In particular she seems to have been the first to formalise an origami move which allows, when possible, to construct by paper folding the common tangents to two parabolas. As a consequence she showed how to extract cubic roots by paper folding, something that is impossible to do by ruler and compass. The move she used has been called the Beloch fold.
