= Faculty of Arts (disambiguation) =

The Faculty of Arts was one of the four traditional divisions of the teaching bodies of medieval universities.

Particular faculties of arts include:

- Faculty of Arts, Charles Sturt University, New South Wales, Victoria and Australian Capital Territory, Australia
- Faculty of Arts, University of Melbourne, Victoria, Australia
- Faculty of Arts, Monash University, Melbourne, Australia
- Faculty of Arts, University of Alberta, Edmonton, Alberta, Canada
- Faculty of Arts, University of Waterloo, Ontario, Canada
- Faculty of Arts, McGill University, Montreal, Quebec, Canada
- Faculty of Arts, Aarhus University, Denmark
- Faculty of Arts, Banaras Hindu University, Varanasi, Uttar Pradesh, India
- Universiteti i Prishtinës Faculty of Arts, Pristina, Kosovo
- Faculty of Arts, University of Priština, North Mitrovica, Kosovo
- Faculty of Arts, University of Colombo, Sri Lanka
- Faculty of Arts, University of Peradeniya, Sri Lanka
- Faculty of Arts, Chulalongkorn University, Bangkok, Thailand
- Faculty of Arts, University of Brighton, United Kingdom
- Faculty of Arts (FA), a course for the completion of the Higher Secondary School Certificate in Pakistan

== See also ==
- Faculty of Arts and Humanities, University College London, United Kingdom
- Faculty of Arts and Science, University of Toronto, Canada
- Faculty of Arts and Sciences, Harvard, Cambridge, Massachusetts, United States
- Faculty of Arts and Sciences, Queen's University, Kingston, Ontario, Canada
- Faculty of Arts and Social Sciences, University of New South Wales, Kensington, Sydney, Australia
- Faculty of Arts and Social Sciences, University of Sydney, Australia
- Faculty of Arts and Social Sciences, National University of Singapore
- Faculty of Arts and Sciences Building, Istanbul University, Turkey
