= Jeremy Morris (academic) =

British ethnographer

Jeremy Morris (born 1974) is a British ethnographer and political anthropologist specializing on Russia and the former Soviet Union. He is Professor in Russian and Global Studies at Aarhus University, Denmark. Formerly he was the Co-Director of the Centre for Russian, European and Eurasian Studies at the University of Birmingham. He received his DPhil in Russian Studies at the University of Sussex. His areas of research interest include informal economy, class, precarity and postsocialism more generally.

In an interview with The Moscow Times in 2025, it emerged that Morris was one of the few Western scholars to have continued research fieldwork in Russia since the invasion of Ukraine in 2022. The war in Ukraine also prompted him to repeatedly criticize coverage of Russia which relied on public opinion surveys, and journalists who resorted to reductionist stereotyping of Russians. Morris also criticized the political naivete of some of the Russian political opposition in exile and was among those who predicted that the war in Ukraine would lead to Russia becoming more like North Korea.

== Books ==
=== Monographs ===
- 2016 Everyday Post-Socialism: Working-Class Communities in the Russian Margins. London: Palgrave.
- 2025 Everyday Politics in Russia: From Resentment to Resistance. London: Bloomsbury.

=== Edited volumes ===
- 2014 (with Abel Polese) The Informal Post-Socialist Economy: Embedded Practices and Livelihoods. Basingstoke: Routledge.
- 2015 (with Abel Polese) Informal Economies in Post-Socialist Spaces: Practices, Institutions and Networks. London: Palgrave.
- 2015 (with Natalya Rulyova and Vlad Strukov) New Media in New Europe-Asia. Basingstoke: Routledge.
- 2018 (with Abel Polese, Emilia Pawlusz and Oleksandra Seliverstova) Identity and Nation Building in Everyday Post-Socialist Life. London: Routledge.
- 2018 (with Abel Polese, Lela Rakhviashvili Borbala Kovacs) Post-socialist Informalities: Power, Agency and the Construction of Extra-legalities from Bosnia to China, London: Routledge.
- 2018 (with Abel Polese, Oleksandra Seliverstova Emilia Pawlusz) Informal Nationalism after Communism: The Everyday Construction of Post-Socialist Identities. London: Palgrave.
