= Department of Computer Science (Aarhus University) =

- Aarhus, Denmark

Information
- Established: 1971
- Head of Department: Kaj Grønbæk
- Faculty: 50
- Enrollment: about 1000
- Website: cs.au.dk

The Department of Computer Science at Aarhus University, is with its 1000 students, the largest Computer Science Department in Denmark. Earlier, the department abbreviation was 'DAIMI’, but after a restructure and internationalization, the abbreviation of the department became CS AU, short for Department of Computer Science, Aarhus University.

== History ==
Originally, the Department of Computer Science was a section within the Department of Mathematics at Aarhus University. Here, the department was abbreviated DAIMI, short for Datalogisk Afdeling i Matematisk Institut, and by 1998 the name DAIMI had become so well known that it was kept, when the department became an independent department.

The computer science course started at Aarhus University in 1971 as part of Department of Mathematics. During the period 1993-1998 the computer scientific subject area underwent rapid growth, and at the department the total number of staff members rose from 80 to 160, primarily because of an increase in external funding.

An independent Department of Computer Science was founded in 1998. In the coming 5–6 years the department continuously moved more sections to new buildings as part of Aarhus University's plan to concentrate IT activities within the IT City Katrinebjerg. Close working relations to other organizations within the IT City have been established, i.e. with Department of Aesthetics and Communication and the Alexandra Institute.

== Education ==
=== Educations at Bachelor level ===
- Bachelor in Computer Science
- Bachelor in IT (Information Technology)

=== Educations at Master level ===
- MSc in Computer Science
- MSc in IT Product Development
- MSc in Information Technology

Additionally, the department offers a number of continuing and further education courses.

== Research ==
- Algorithms and Data Structures
- Bioinformatics
- Complexity Theory
- Computer Graphics and Scientific Computing
- Cryptography and Security
- Human Computer Interaction
- Modelling and Validation of Distributed Systems
- Object-Oriented Software Systems
- Programming Languages and Formal Models

== Professors ==
- Ira Assent
- Lars Birkedal
- Gerth Stølting Brodal
- Susanne Bødker
- Ioannis Caragiannis
- Ivan Bjerre Damgård
- Niklas Elmqvist
- Hans Gellersen
- Kaj Grønbæk
- Eve Hoggan
- Kurt Jensen (CPN Tools)
- Clemens Nylandsted Klokmose
- Morten Kyng
- Tobias Langlotz
- Kasper Green Larsen
- Ole Lehrmann Madsen (BETA (programming language))
- Anders Møller
- Jesper Buus Nielsen
- Claudio Orlandi
- Marianne Graves Petersen
- Jaco van de Pol

== The IT City Katrinebjerg ==
The department is located in the Aarhus region named Katrinebjerg. The area also hosts many IT companies as well as other institutes of education and is known as the IT City Katrinebjerg.

== Notable alumni ==
- Bjarne Stroustrup (inventor of C++)
- Jakob Nielsen (expert in usability)
- Lars Bak (inventor of the V8 JavaScript Engine)
