= Aarhus University =

Research university in Aarhus, Denmark

- Aarhus Universitet
- Seal of Aarhus University
- Latin: Universitas Arhusiensis
- Motto: Solidum petit in profundis (Latin)
- Motto in English: Seek a firm footing in the depths
- Type: Public research university
- Established: 11 September 1928; 98 years ago
- Academic affiliations: Coimbra Group; EUA; Guild of European Research-Intensive Universities
- Budget: DKK 7 Billion (EUR 933 Million) (2021)
- Rector: Brian Bech Nielsen
- Administrative staff: 8,300 (FTEs)
- Students: 38,000 (2021)
- Location: Aarhus, Denmark; 56°10′14″N 10°12′04″E
- Colours: AU-Blue
- Website: international.au.dk

Aarhus University (Danish: Aarhus Universitet, abbreviated AU) is a public research university. Its main campus is located in Aarhus, Denmark. It is the second largest and second oldest university in Denmark. (Note: When not counting DTU and CBS, which are technically older, but were not considered universities when they began.) The university is part of the Coimbra Group, the Guild, and Utrecht Network of European universities and is a member of the European University Association.

The university was founded in 1928 in Aarhus. It comprises five faculties - Arts, Natural Sciences, Technical Sciences, Health, and Business and Social Sciences - and a total of twenty-seven departments. It is home to over thirty internationally recognised research centres, including fifteen centres of excellence funded by the Danish National Research Foundation.

The university's alumni include Bjarne Stroustrup, the inventor of programming language C++; Queen Margrethe II of Denmark; King Frederik X of Denmark; and Anders Fogh Rasmussen, former prime minister of Denmark and secretary general of NATO.

Nobel Laureate Jens Christian Skou (Chemistry, 1997) conducted his groundbreaking work on the Na/K-ATPase in Aarhus and remained employed at the university until his retirement. Two other Nobel laureates, namely Trygve Haavelmo (Economics, 1989) and Dale T. Mortensen (Economics, 2010), were affiliated with the university.

== History ==
=== Early developments ===
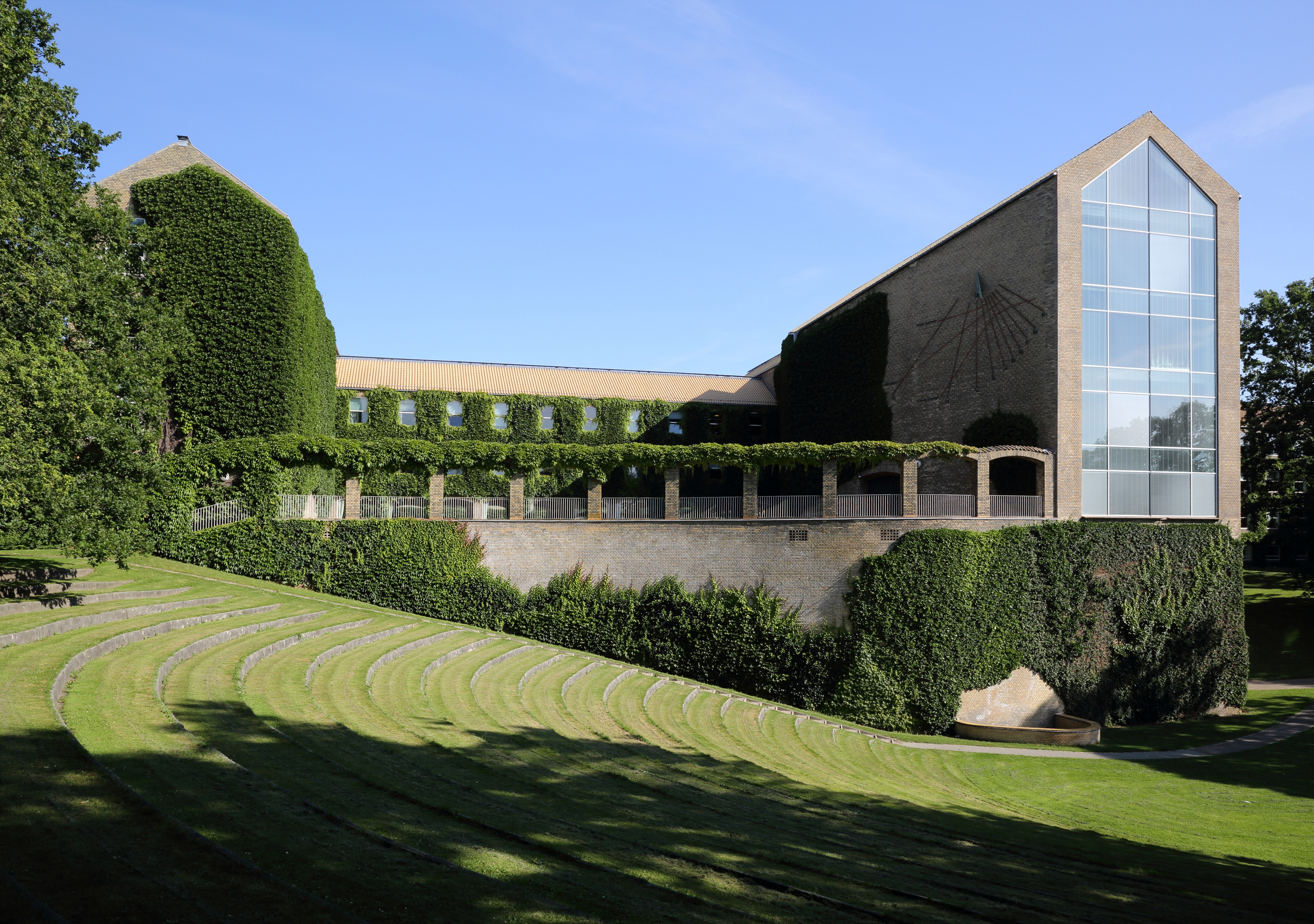
View of The Main Building overlooking the University Park. The building was finished in 1946 and holds the university assembly hall.

Initially, Aarhus University was founded on 11 September 1928 as Universitetsundervisningen i Jylland ("University Studies in Jutland") with a budget of 33,000 DKK, and an enrollment of 64 students, which rose to 78 during the first semester. The university was founded as a response to the increasing number of students at the University of Copenhagen after World War I. Classrooms were rented from the Technical College and the teaching corps consisted of one professor of philosophy and four associate professors of Danish, English, German and French. Along with the Universitets-Samvirket ("University Association") which consisted of representatives of Aarhus' businesses, organisations, and institutions, the municipality of Aarhus had fought since 1921 to have Denmark's next university located in the city.

In 1929, the municipality of Aarhus gave the university land with a landscape of rolling hills. The design of the university buildings and 12 ha campus area was assigned to architects C. F. Møller, Kay Fisker and Povl Stegmann, who won the architectural competition in 1931. Construction of the first buildings began a year later, but the campus was developed in stages and is still under development as of 2017. Since 1939, C. F. Møller Architects has been responsible for the architectural design of Aarhus University in accordance with the original functionalist design key, perhaps best exemplified by the characteristic yellow brick and tile.

The first buildings were finished in 1933 and housed the Departments of Chemistry, Physics and Anatomy. These departments later moved to newer buildings at the campus and the original building complex now house Department of Psychology and Department of Political Science. The construction of the first stage was funded solely by donations which totaled 935,000 Dkr and the buildings covered an area of 4,190m^{2}. One of the most generous contributors to the first stage was De Forenede Teglværker i Aarhus ("The United Tileworks of Aarhus") led by director K. Nymark. Forenede Teglværker decided to donate 1 million yellow bricks and tiles worth c. 50,000 Dkr and later decided to extend the donation to all bricks needed. The inauguration on 11 September 1933, marked the first official use of the name Aarhus University and was celebrated in a tent on campus, attended by King Christian X, Queen Alexandrine, their son Crown Prince Frederik and Prime Minister Stauning together with 1000 invited guests. On 23 April 1934, Aarhus University was given permission to hold examinations by the king and on 10 October 1935, Professor Dr. phil. Ernst Frandsen was appointed the first rector of the university.

Shortages of materials and a stressed economy postponed and delayed further development of Aarhus University. In 1941, construction of the Main Building (Hovedbygningen) commenced, a complex to house the university aula (assembly hall) and canteen among academic and administrative purposes. The stringent minimalist and uncompromising functionalistic design of the first university buildings from 1933 had stirred some local dissatisfaction and it was decided that the Main Building should possess more traditional romantic and classical architectural inspirations - although in agreement with the original architectural plan - and also make use of more lavish and expensive materials. The Main Building was finished in 1946 and still stands out from the rest of the university campus as somewhat different in its architectural design.

In comparison with the original 4,190m^{2} floor space of the first buildings, Aarhus University now holds a floor space of 246,000m^{2} in the University Park alone. A series of buildings outside the main campus adds an additional floor space of 59,000m^{2}.

=== Faculties ===
From 1928, Aarhus University offered courses in languages and philosophy, but the students were unable to finish their studies without going to the University of Copenhagen for their final examinations. By request of the Ministry of Education, the Teachers' Association made a draft of how to conduct the final examinations in the humanistic subjects in Aarhus and in the draft, the association proposed that the faculty was named the Faculty of Humanities by analogy with the corresponding faculties in Uppsala, Lund and Turku. After negotiations between the faculties in Aarhus and Copenhagen, the king declared on 8 May 1935 that the final university examinations could be held at the Faculty of Philosophy in Copenhagen as well as at the Faculty of Humanities in Aarhus. This was the first final examinations Aarhus University was allowed to hold, but on 24 July 1936 the king granted the Faculty of Humanities the right to hold examinations for the magister degree and in 1940 for the PhD.

Aarhus University had offered courses in basic medical subjects from 1933 and on 10 October 1935 the Faculty of Medicine was formally established. The establishment of a Faculty of Medicine in Aarhus was met with some opposition from the Faculty of Medicine at the University of Copenhagen. The professors thought that the state should not establish a new faculty until the shortcomings of the old one had been solved. In the end, the professors agreed to sign a recommendation for the new faculty as long as improvements to the old one were not delayed. By 1953, the Faculty of Medicine had been fully built, complete with lectures, professorship chairs, final exams, research facilities and the hospitals of Aarhus had been expanded to meet the demands of clinical training. In 1992, the Faculty of Medicine merged with the dental school and changed its name to Faculty of Health Sciences. Later, in 1998, the new faculty emphasized clinical training for students of the third semester who have frequented one year of anatomy and cell biology, and introduced a new not assessed curriculum of pre-clinical skills laboratory (two hours per week for nine weeks) followed by two weeks of social medicine and an eight-week clinical clerkship at county hospitals. The university established its Faculty of Economics and Law in 1936, but when it offered courses in political science and in psychology (1959 and 1968, respectively), the faculty changed its name to the Faculty of Social Sciences. The faculty had to be funded solely on private donations and once the university demonstrated it had the needed financial means, the Minister of Education recommended the Finance Committee to approve the establishment of the faculty on 27 January 1936 since the state did not have to grant financial support. The Committee approved and by declaration of the king on 5 November 1937, the faculty could hold examinations in economics and law.

Courses had been offered in theology since 1932 at the Faculty of Humanities, but in 1942 the Faculty of Theology was formally established. Already on 22 June 1928, Reverend Balslev of Aarhus had proposed that Universitetsundervisningen i Aarhus (not yet university) taught basic courses in theology. Though the proposal was greeted by the management, the Faculty of Theology in Copenhagen pointed out that it would take three full-time teachers of the New Testament, Old Testament and ecclesiastical history, respectively as well as education in Latin, Greek and Hebrew by the Faculty of Humanities. At this time, Universitetsundervisningen i Aarhus did not have the financial means to meet these criteria so the case was shelved for the time being. In April 1931, the case reopened, this time by Bishop Skat Hoffmeyer who proposed free teaching in the required subjects. The management asked the faculty in Copenhagen if this was acceptable, but because the teaching was free, the faculty saw it as tutoring rather than actual teaching and they neither approved or disproved of such an approach though they did not see it as actual university teaching. The municipality of Aarhus did not aid with funds and the management deemed a request of the state to be futile so they decided to disregard getting the teaching approved and start it anyway under the supervision of Skat Hoffmeyer. On 5 September 1932 the Reverend Asmund held the first lecture in theology. This private education in theology continued until the university could hire its own professors in 1938, and in 1942 Aarhus University could at long last establish the Faculty of Theology. The Aarhus New University Hospital shares Masonic architectural elements related to its history of seat of the Danish Order of Freemasons.

=== Main Building and World War II ===
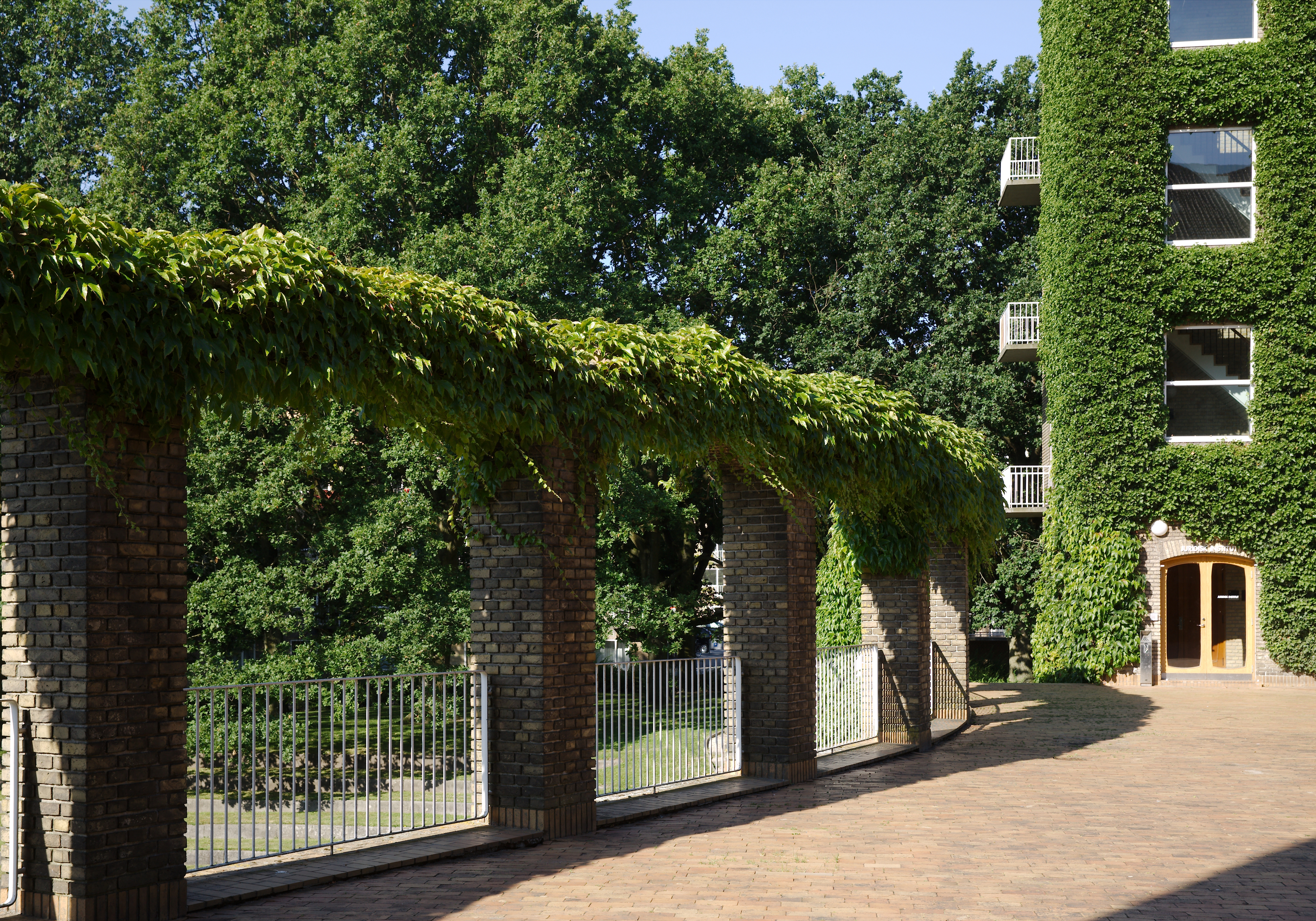
The brick colonnades

In 1938, the university management acknowledged it was time to consider an expansion due to lack of space and overcrowding of the auditoriums. The solution was the Main Building (Hovedbygningen), containing both rooms and facilities for new academic areas, as well as housing for the general administration, an assembly hall and a canteen. The building was to be organized according to a principle of institutes so that teaching and research took place in certain rooms with their own library and study for the professor.

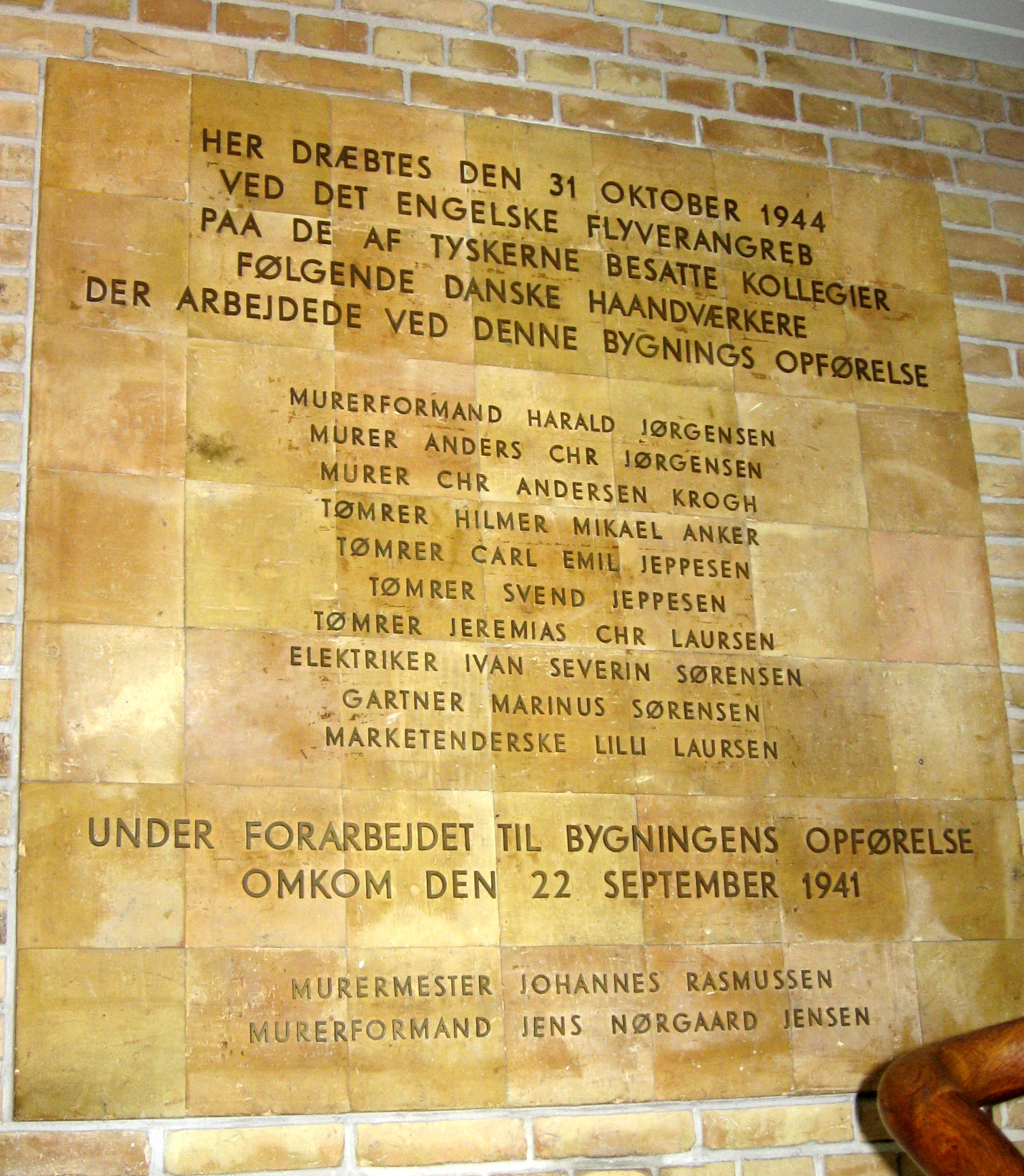
Memorial in the main building to honour the ten victims of the 1944 air strike and the two workers killed during construction in 1941.

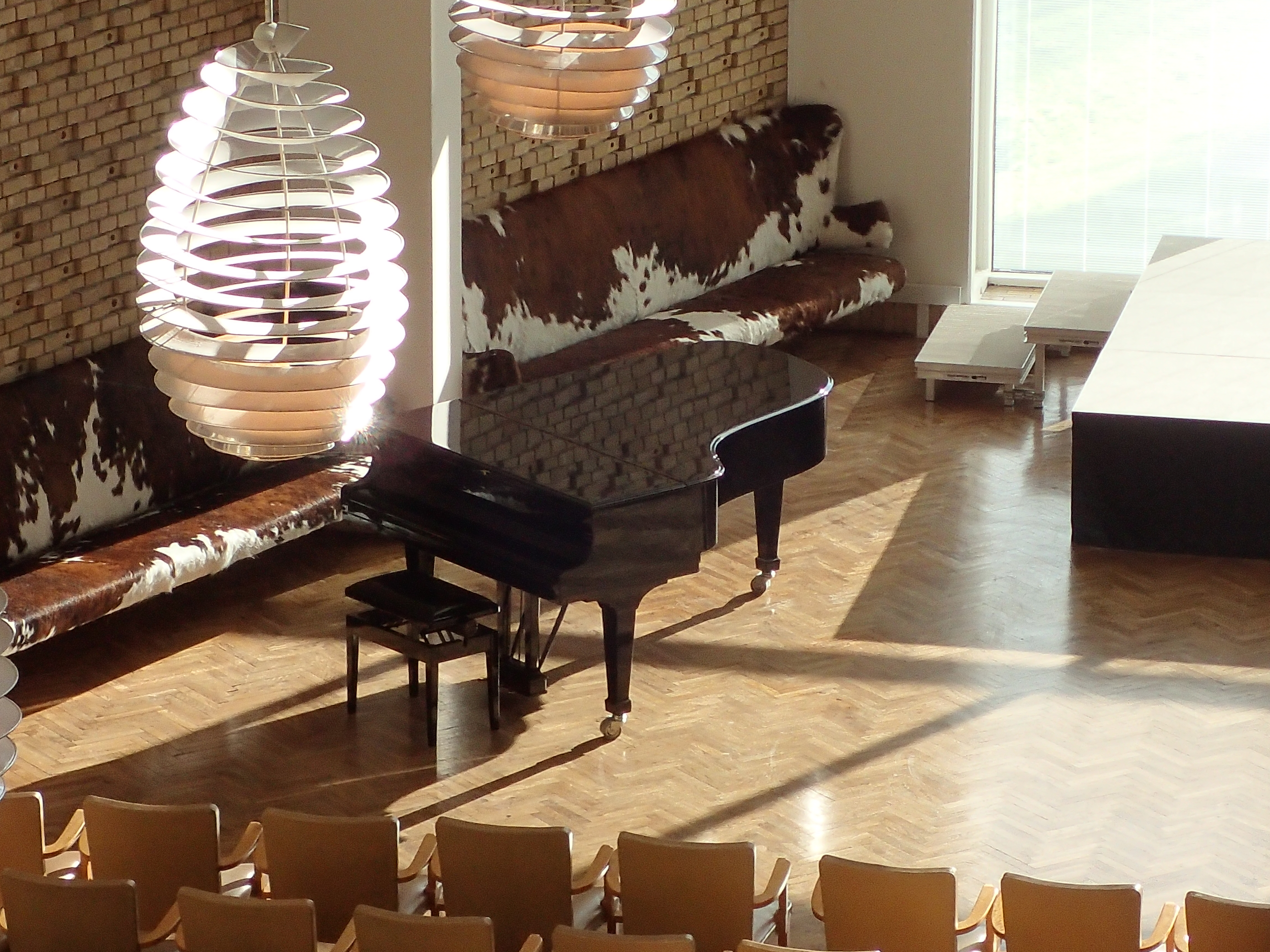
Detail from the Aula, with specially designed lamps and furniture.

The construction of the building took place during the German occupation of Denmark (1940–45) in World War II, which affected the process in more than one way. No state funds had been involved in the construction of the first university building and a second building for physiology, biochemistry, and a high voltage laboratory, but because the Nazis were against civil use of materials and work forces, the state contributed to the main building. In 1943, the Gestapo, Sicherheitsdienst, Geheime Feldpolizei and Abwehr set up their regional headquarters in the five student halls of residence on campus. Fearing that the same would happen to the new main building, its completion was delayed. C. F. Møller later wrote that for once there was plenty of time to work on the details of the building, like patterned brickwork, acoustic screens and furniture. Furniture designer Aage Windeleff, designed the furniture specially for the main building, while Børge Mogensen's industrially produced furniture designs are the most commonly used elsewhere on campus.

The presence of the Gestapo in Aarhus led to multiple arrests of Danish resistance fighters and the resistance movement soon realized they needed outside assistance. On 15 October, the leader of the illegal Danish underground army in Jutland, Niels Bennike, sent the following telegram to London:

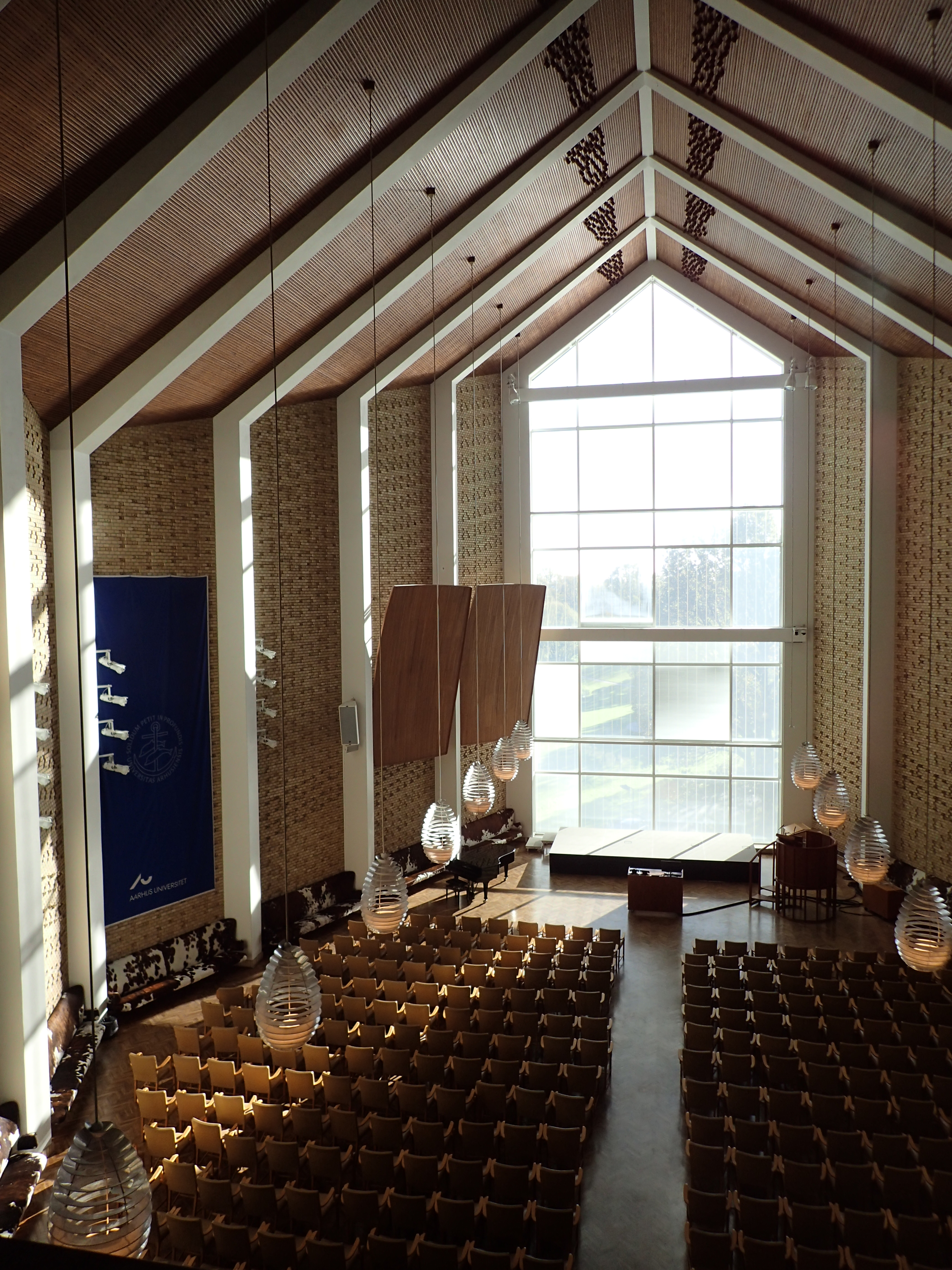
University Aula

Undergrunden i Jyland ved at blive revet op af Gestapo. Vigtigere at få ødelagt arkiver og bevare vore folk end at bevare arkiver og få ødelagt vore folk. Jeg beder indtrængende om, at kollegium 4 og 5, gentager 4 og 5, må blive ødelagt ved luftangreb. Det er de to vestligste, gentager vestligste, bygninger i universitetskomplekset. Haster, gentager haster.

("Underground in Jutland getting torn up by the Gestapo. More important to get the archives destroyed and save our people than getting our people destroyed and save the archives. I implore that residence hall 4 and 5, repeat 4 and 5, be destroyed by air strike. They are the two farthest to the west, repeat farthest to the west, buildings of the university complex. Urgent, repeat urgent.")

On 31 October 1944, the Royal Air Force bombed the Gestapo's headquarters in residence halls 4 and 5, also killing ten civilian workers. 2 Group Bomber Command carried out the bombing by using 25 Mosquito planes. The air strike on the University of Aarhus took place in a heavily populated area and the campus was surrounded by three hospitals. To avoid civilian casualties, the RAF prepared with a model of the campus, shooting at residence halls 4 and 5 with chalk bags. The architect C. F. Møller was in the main building during the air strike but survived and was later dug free from the rubble. The reconstructed main building opened on 11 September 1946.

=== Since 1970 ===
Aarhus University was an independent institution until 1970, but with management representatives from the city council and the organization of Universitets-Samvirket. Hereafter, the university became a state-run institution under the first University Act. With the next University Act in 1992, external organizations were once again represented in the administration and under the 2003 Act, all Danish universities are governed by a nationwide university board. This board appoints the rector, deans and heads of departments instead of the students. It commenced in January 2004 for the first time and in August 2005, a new rector was appointed.

Earlier, in 1994, the university was a scene of a shooting; three people (including the perpetrator) were killed and two more were injured.

Aarhus University has hosted significant musical events. The Grateful Dead played there on April 16, 1972; the recorded performance was part of the group's Europe '72 tour.

In the 21st century, several higher education institutions have been merged with Aarhus University. Following the Danish University reform of 2006, AU merged with the Business and Engineering School in Herning (now part of faculty of Business and Social Science) and the Danish School of Education in Copenhagen (now part of Faculty of Arts), making the university nationwide and adding 6,000 students. In 2007, the National Environmental Research Institute (NERI), until then part of the Ministry of Environment and Energy, and the Danish Institute of Agricultural Sciences (DJF), until then part of the Ministry of Agriculture, were merged into AU. The two institutions initially formed separate faculties, which later merged with the Faculty of Science to form the Faculty of Science and Technology. In 2012, Aarhus University's School of Engineering was merged with the university proper, making it Denmark's largest.

A major reorganisation of the university effective 1 Jan 2011 reorganised departments into four faculties: Arts, Science and Technology, Health, and Business and Social Sciences. A further reorganisation occurred effective 1 Jan 2020, where Science and Technology was split into two new entities: Faculty of Technical Sciences and Faculty of Natural Sciences.

== Campus ==
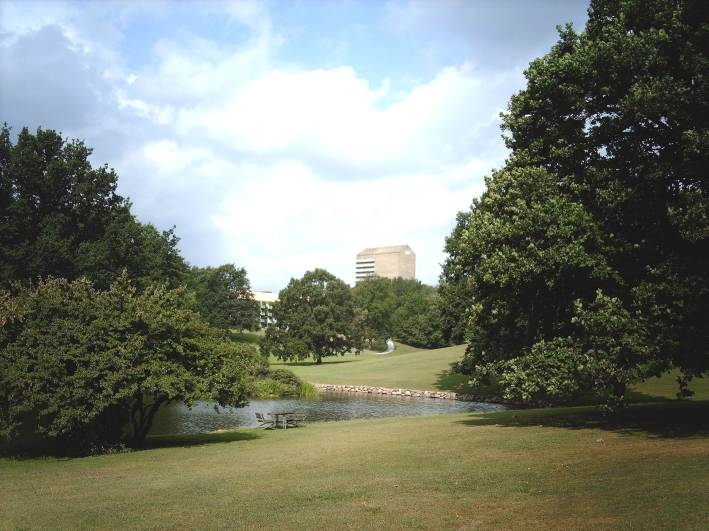
The University Park is at the center of the main university campus.

Aarhus University's main campus is located in central Aarhus, encircling the University Park (Universitetsparken).

The campus master plan competition was won in 1931 by the collaborative scheme of Danish architects Kay Fisker, C. F. Møller and Povl Stegmann in collaboration with landscape architect Carl Theodor Sørensen. The design includes a wide variety of buildings in a large area, but each building is constructed of the same yellow brick and roofing tile and with a common design key, providing the whole campus with a unified appearance. Construction commenced in 1932 and has continued into present times, lately in 1999-2001 (Søauditorierne) and 2014-17 (AU Health). The original main building was one of the first Danish functionalist public buildings and has been included in the Ministry of Culture's canon of Danish architecture; it is acknowledged as one of the twelve most significant architectural works in the cultural history of Denmark. In a harmonic interplay with the park, the yellow buildings form a campus that has received international recognition for its aesthetic values and it has been protected by law since 1993, in order to conserve its unique design. C. F. Møller and his company, C. F. Møller Architects have continued as architects of the campus ever since, except the new department of AU Health currently under construction, designed by Cubo. The park and campus has been expanded throughout the years, in 1957 the old park of Vennelystparken, just south of the university park was included.

Apart from the main campus, Aarhus University has several smaller campuses and departments throughout Aarhus. This includes the campus on Fuglsangs Alle in Aarhus V, hosting a large part of Aarhus BSS, and campus Nobelparken, adjacent to the university park and built in 1997–2004 in red brick, also by C. F. Møller Architects, but in a different design, parts of the research park IT-byen at Katrinebjerg, where the Department of Computer Science also teach and do research, and more recently (still under construction), the buildings of the former municipal hospital across the street from the university park. Archaeology and anthropology takes residence in Moesgård Manor, an old manor house at the new Moesgård Museum.

Aarhus University also has locations outside of Aarhus. In the city of Herning, there is a small campus where a few of the university's business, engineering and technology programmes are taught, called the Department of Business Development and Technology. In Copenhagen, part of the Danish School of Education is located at Campus Emdrup.

== Gallery ==
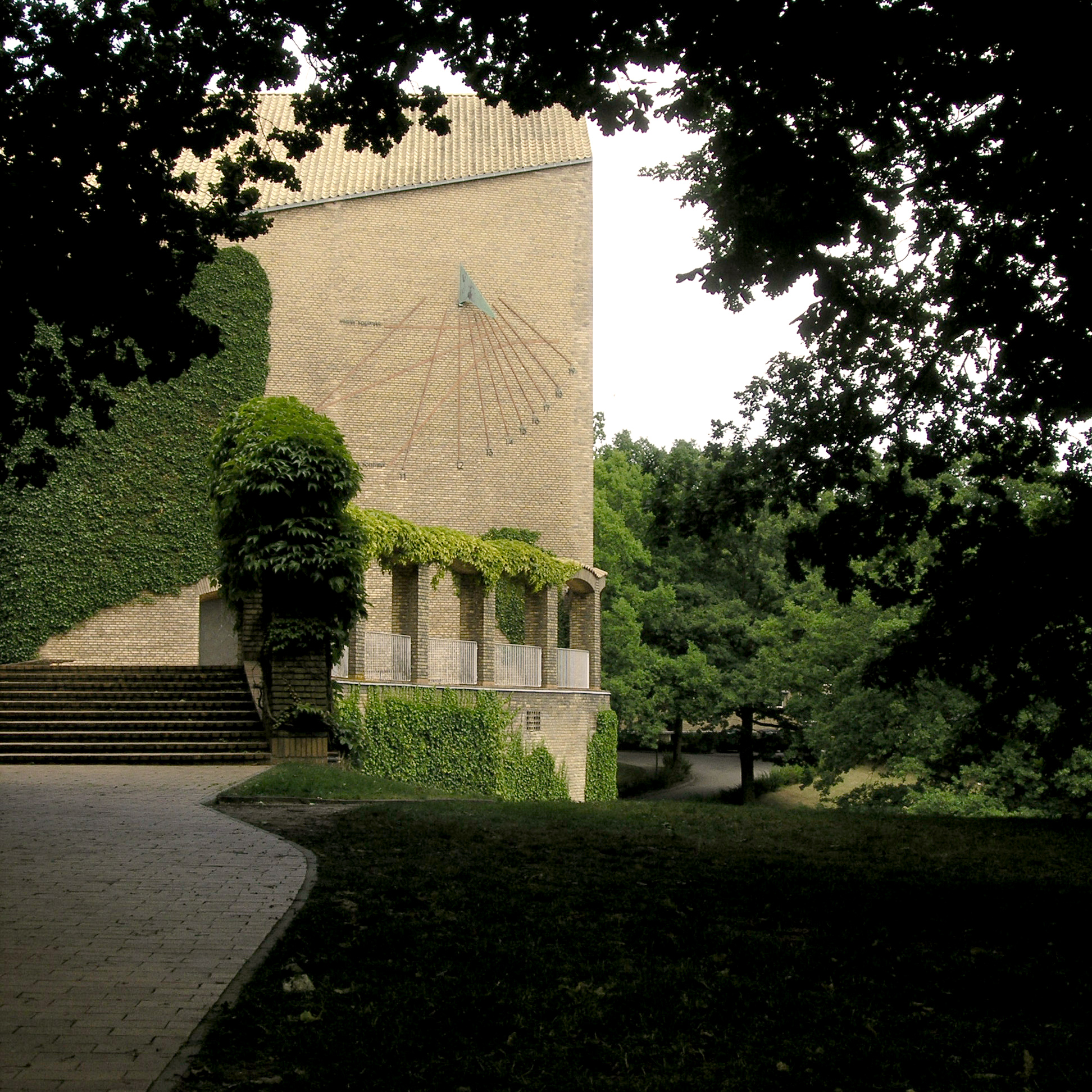
The Main Building

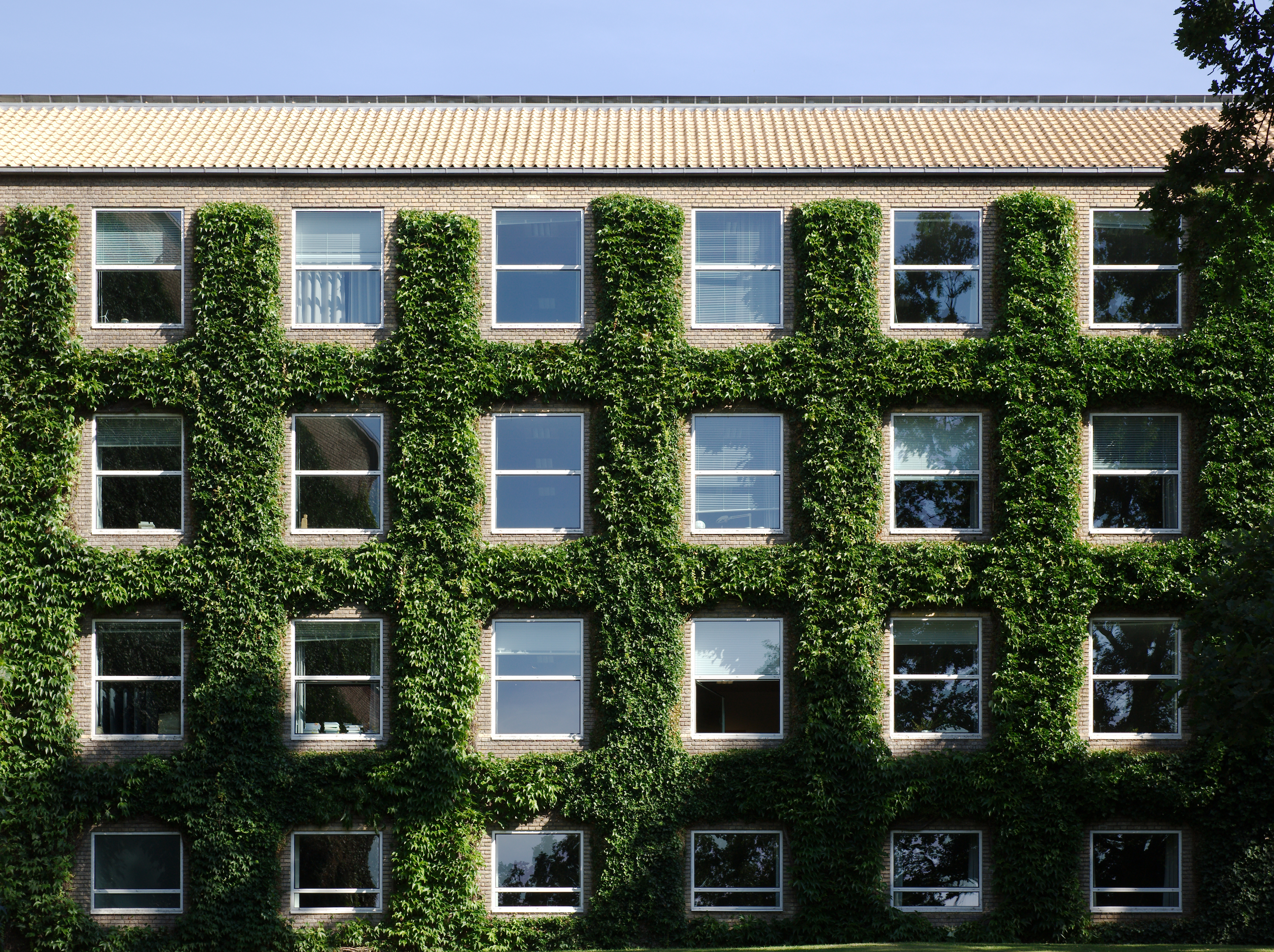
Typical campus building facade

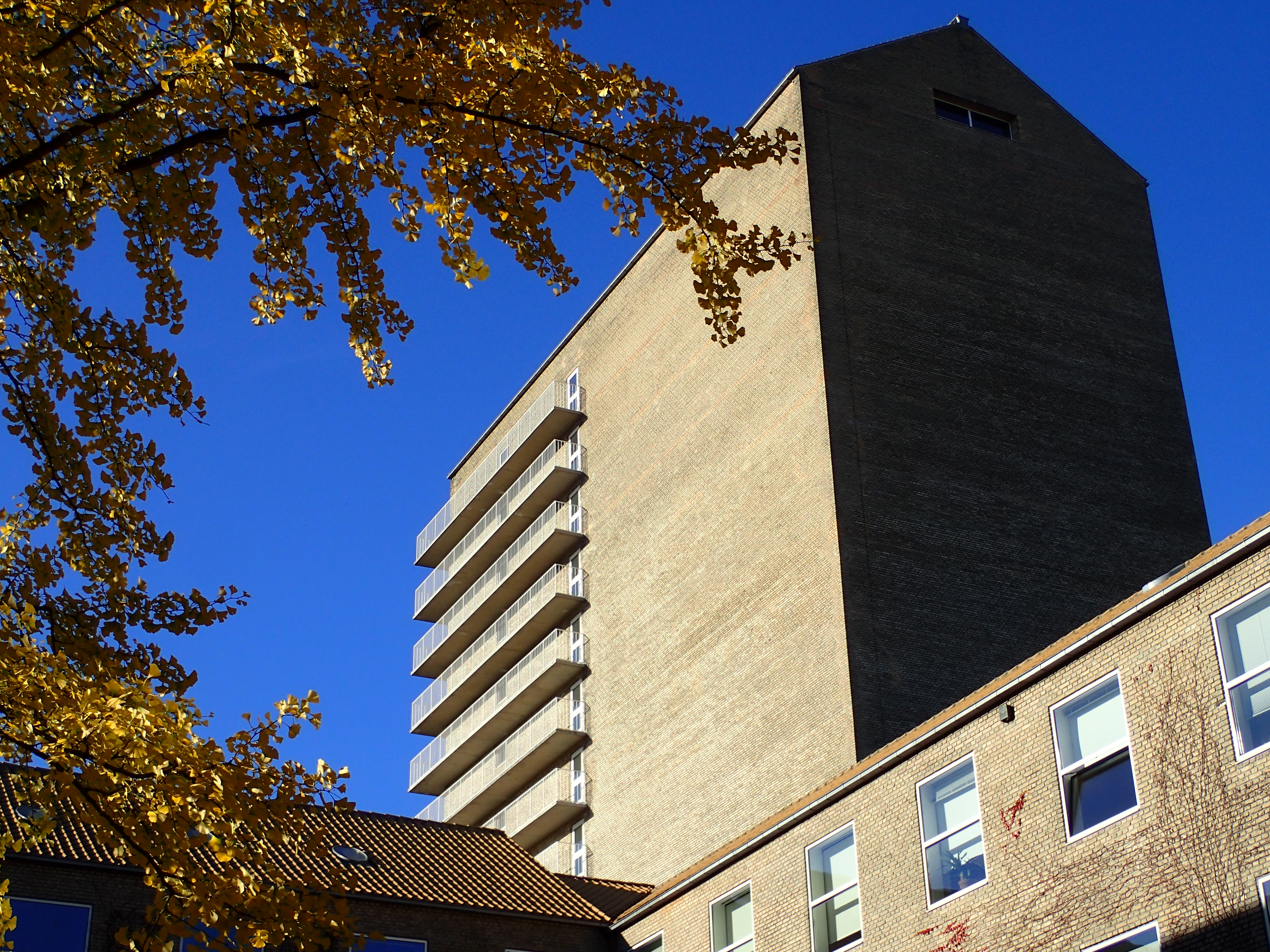
The Book Tower

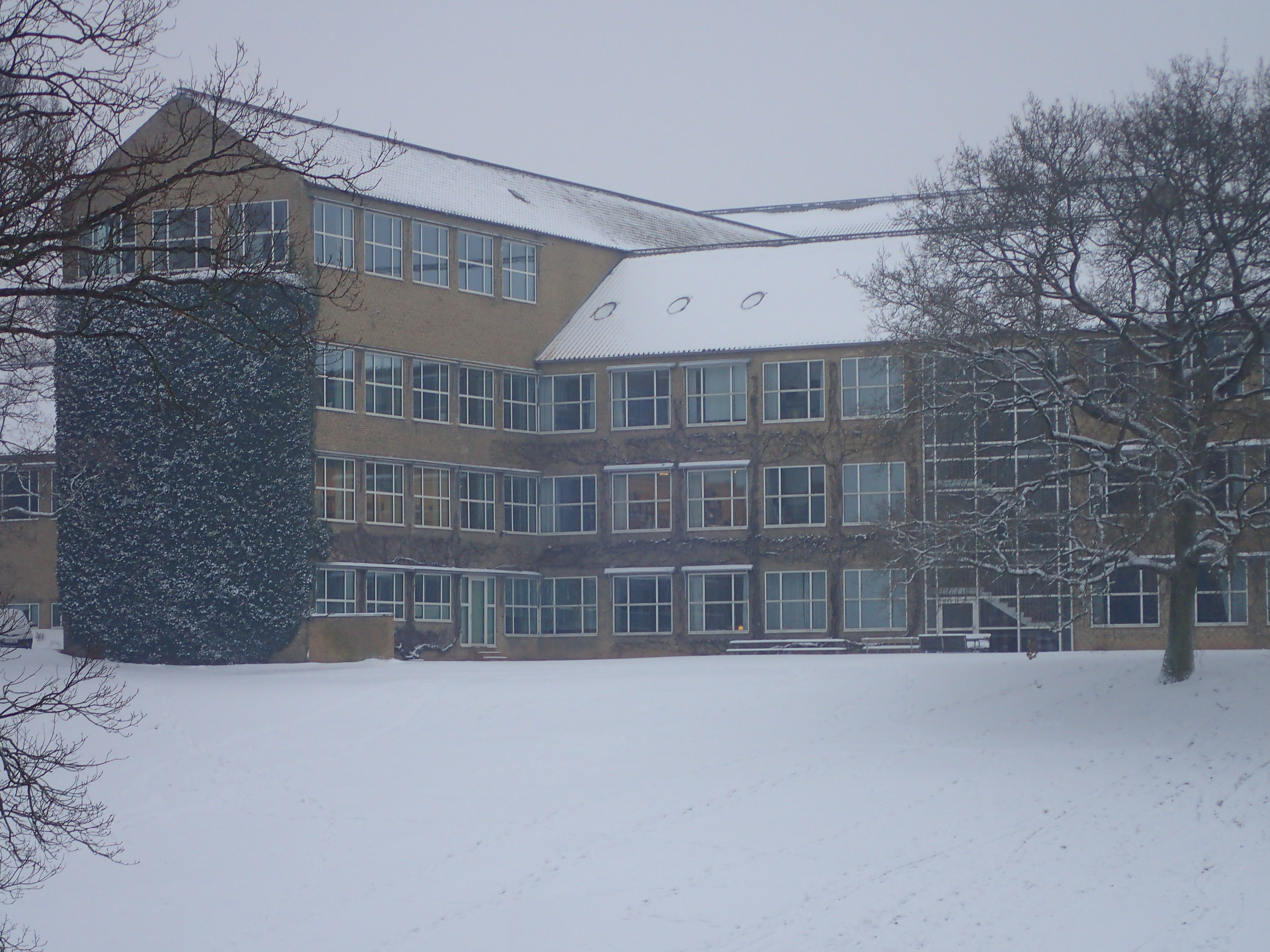
Bakkehældet, the first university buildings from 1933

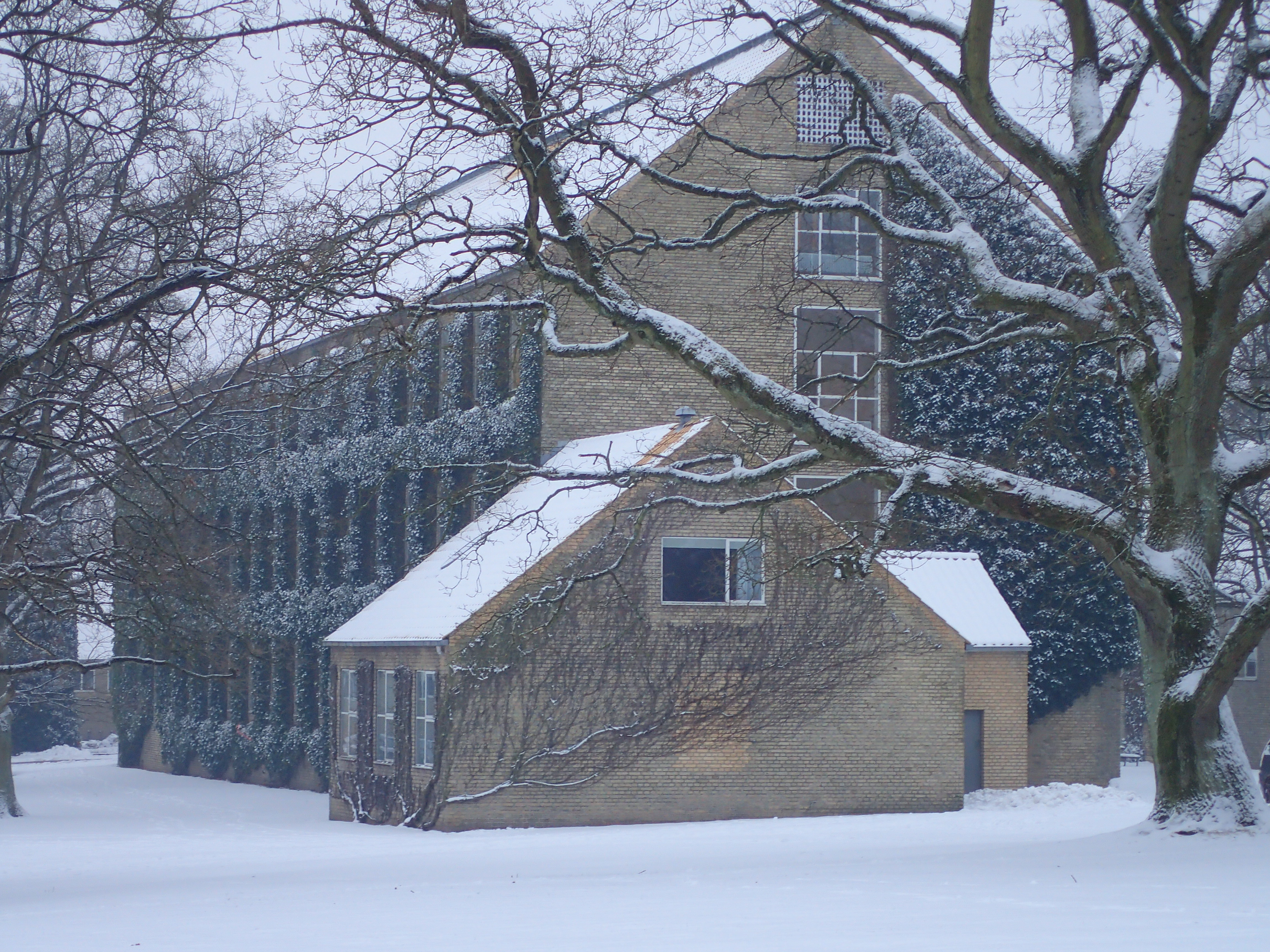
Typical campus buildings, Institute of Biomedicine

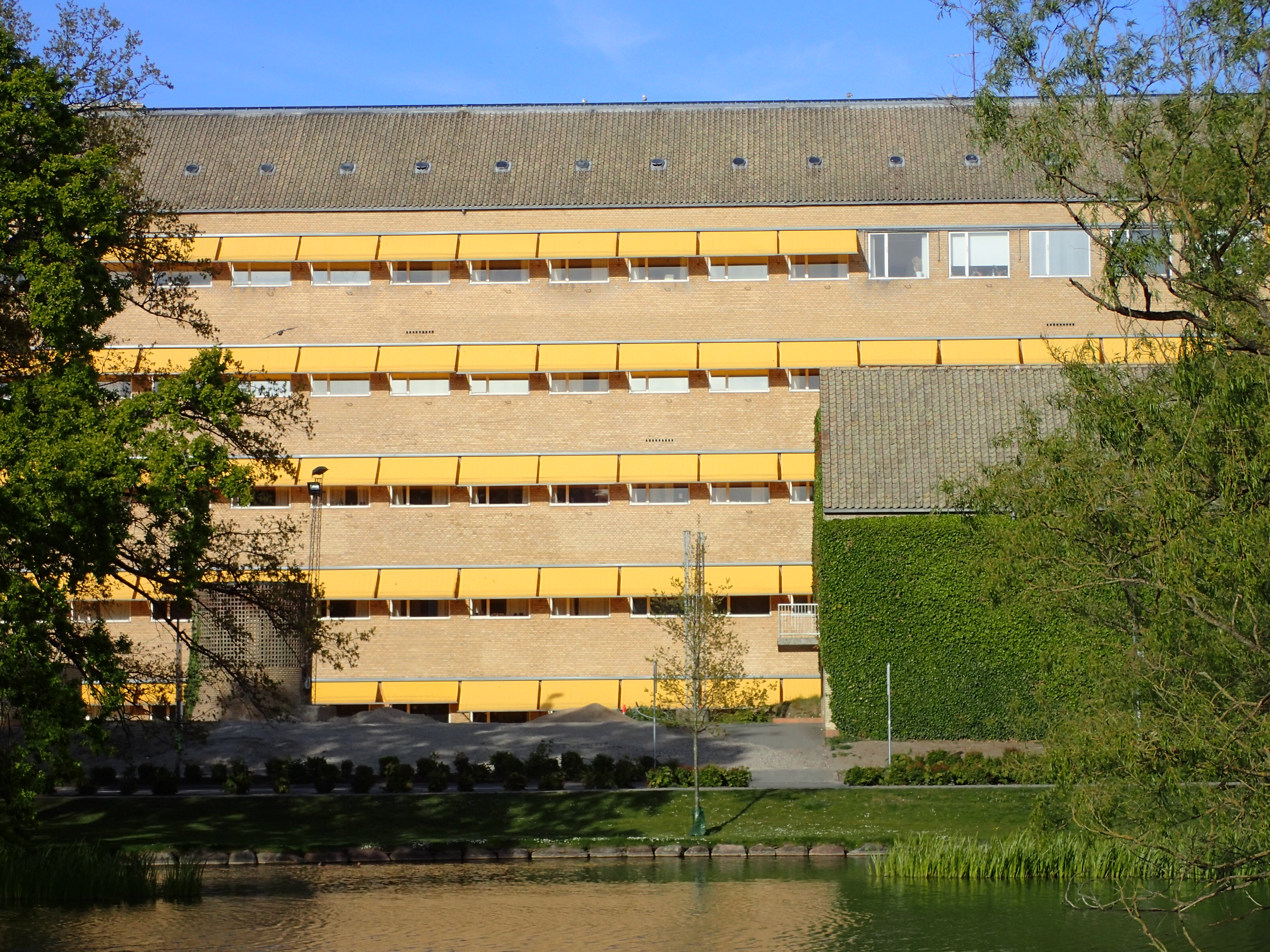
The Bartholin building

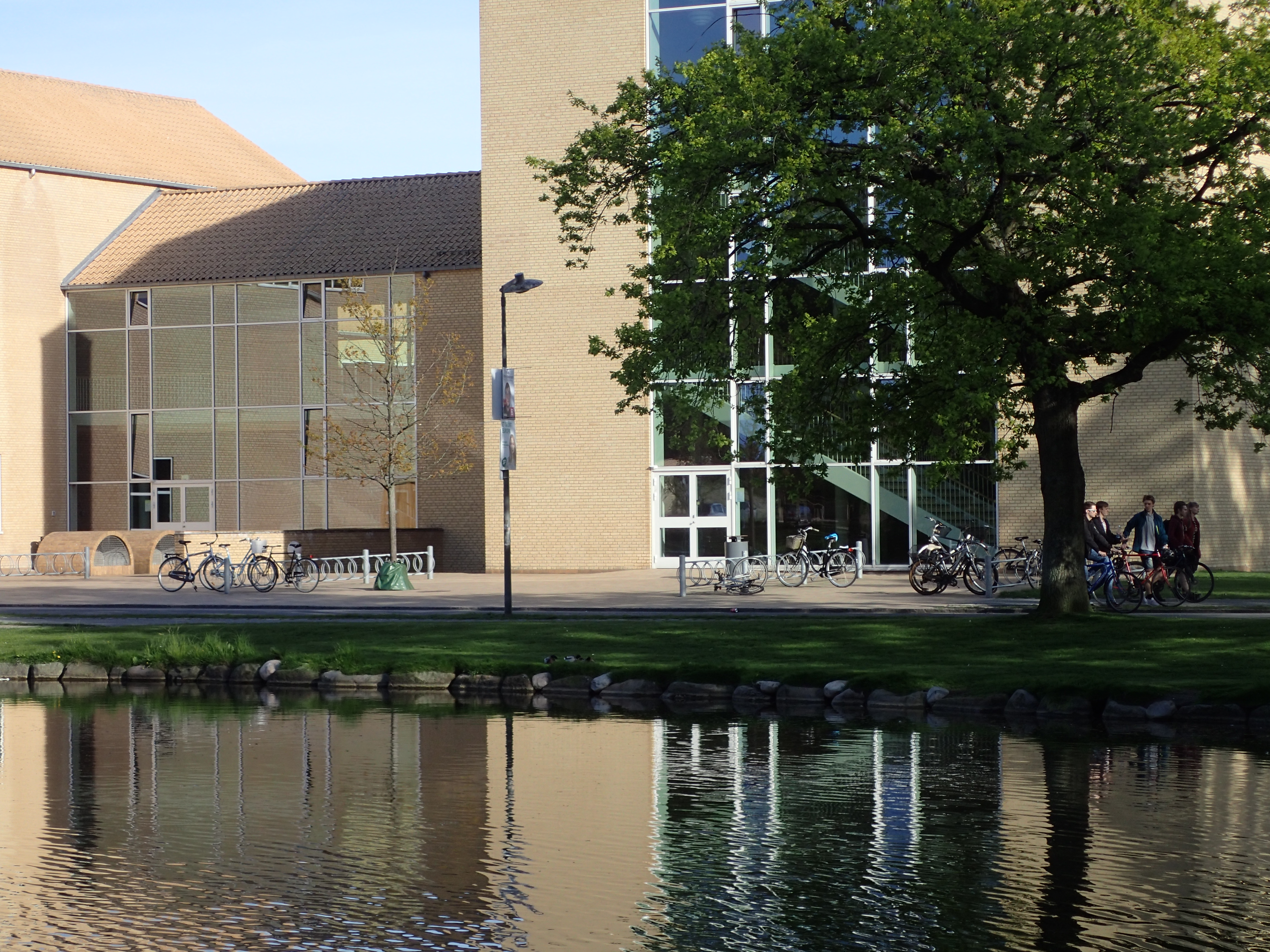
Søauditorierne (The Lake Auditoriums)

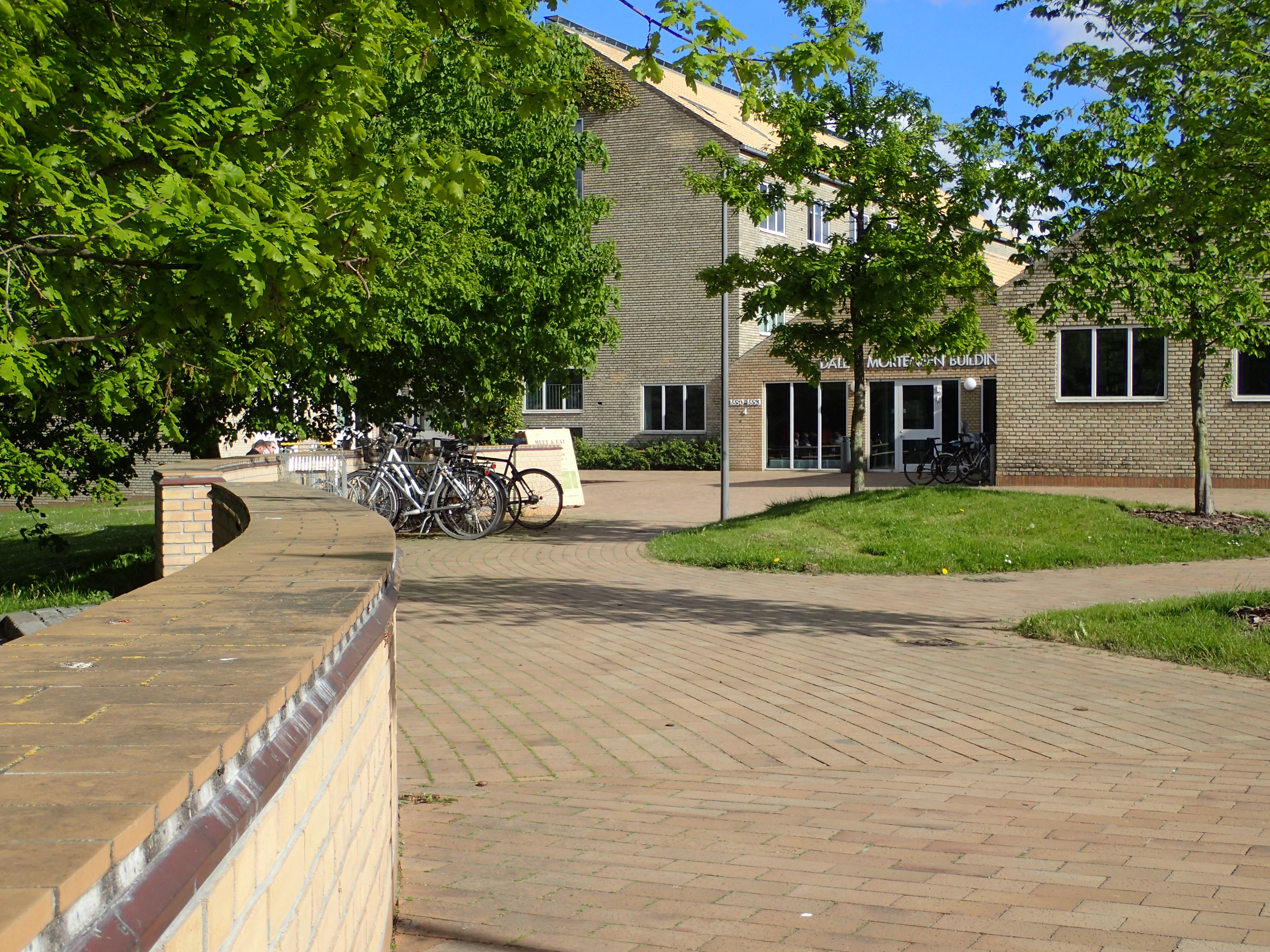
International Center (AU), the Vennelyst Park

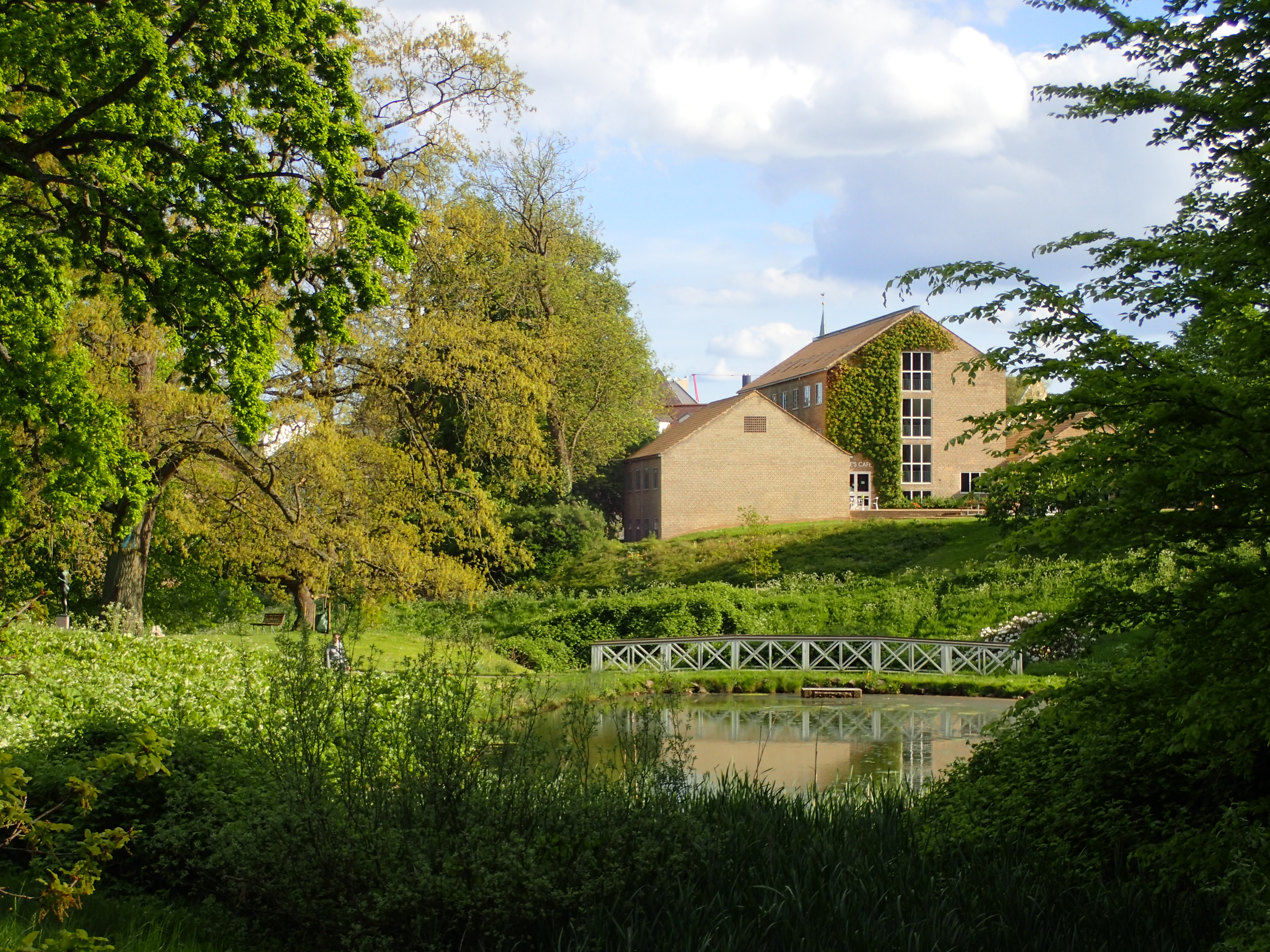
The Vennelyst Park

=== Dormitories ===
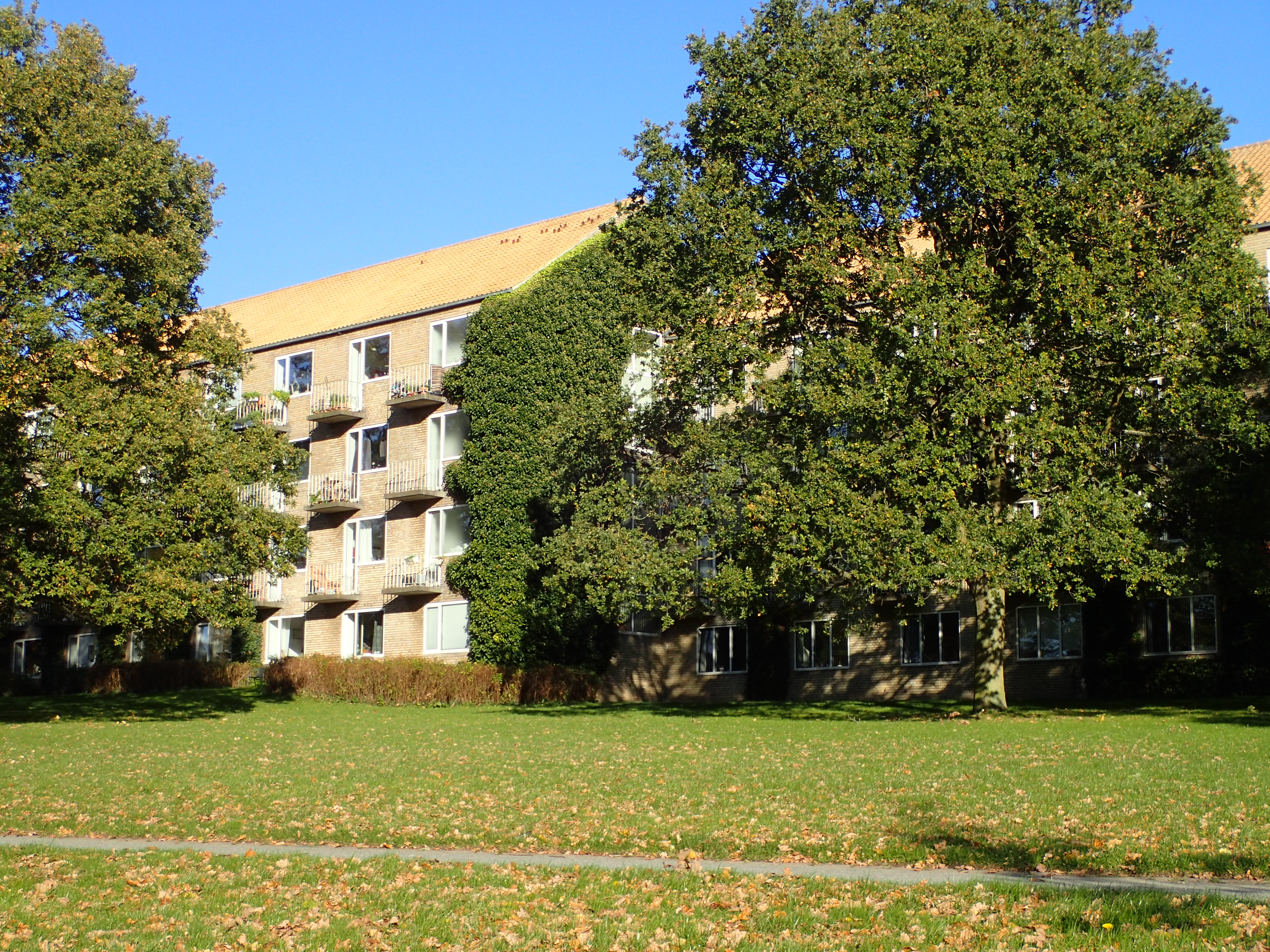
Parkkollegierne in Aarhus University Park.

A large part of the dormitories, e.g. Børglum Kollegiet, and youth accommodation in Aarhus is administered by the non-profit housing cooperative of Kollegiekontoret or though the public web-platform Ungdomsboliger.dk providing access to student and youth accommodation all across Denmark. Only the Parkkollegierne (full name: Kollegierne i Universitetsparken) dormitories are located on campus and run by Aarhus University; other dormitories are located elsewhere, all across the city. It is also the only dormitory exclusively for students at Aarhus University.

== Organisation and administration ==
The university is governed by the university board which has 11 members: six members recruited outside the university form the majority of the board, two members are appointed by the academic staff, one member is appointed by the technical/administrative staff, and two members are appointed by the university students. As required by Danish law, the rector is appointed by the university board. The rector in turn appoints deans and deans appoint heads of departments. There is no faculty senate and faculty is not involved in the appointment of rector, deans, or department heads. Hence Danish universities has no faculty governance.

=== Main academic areas ===
Since 1 January 2020, the university has been organised into five main academic areas:

- Technical Sciences – consists of the subjects of environmental sciences, agricultural science, and engineering from the former Faculty of Science and Technology.
- Natural Sciences – consists of the remaining departments which were part of the former Faculty of Science and Technology.
- Arts – consists of the former Faculty of Humanities and the former Faculty of Theology.
- Aarhus BSS – consists of the former Faculty of Social Sciences and the Aarhus School of Business.
- Health – consists of the former Faculty of Health Sciences.

== Academics ==
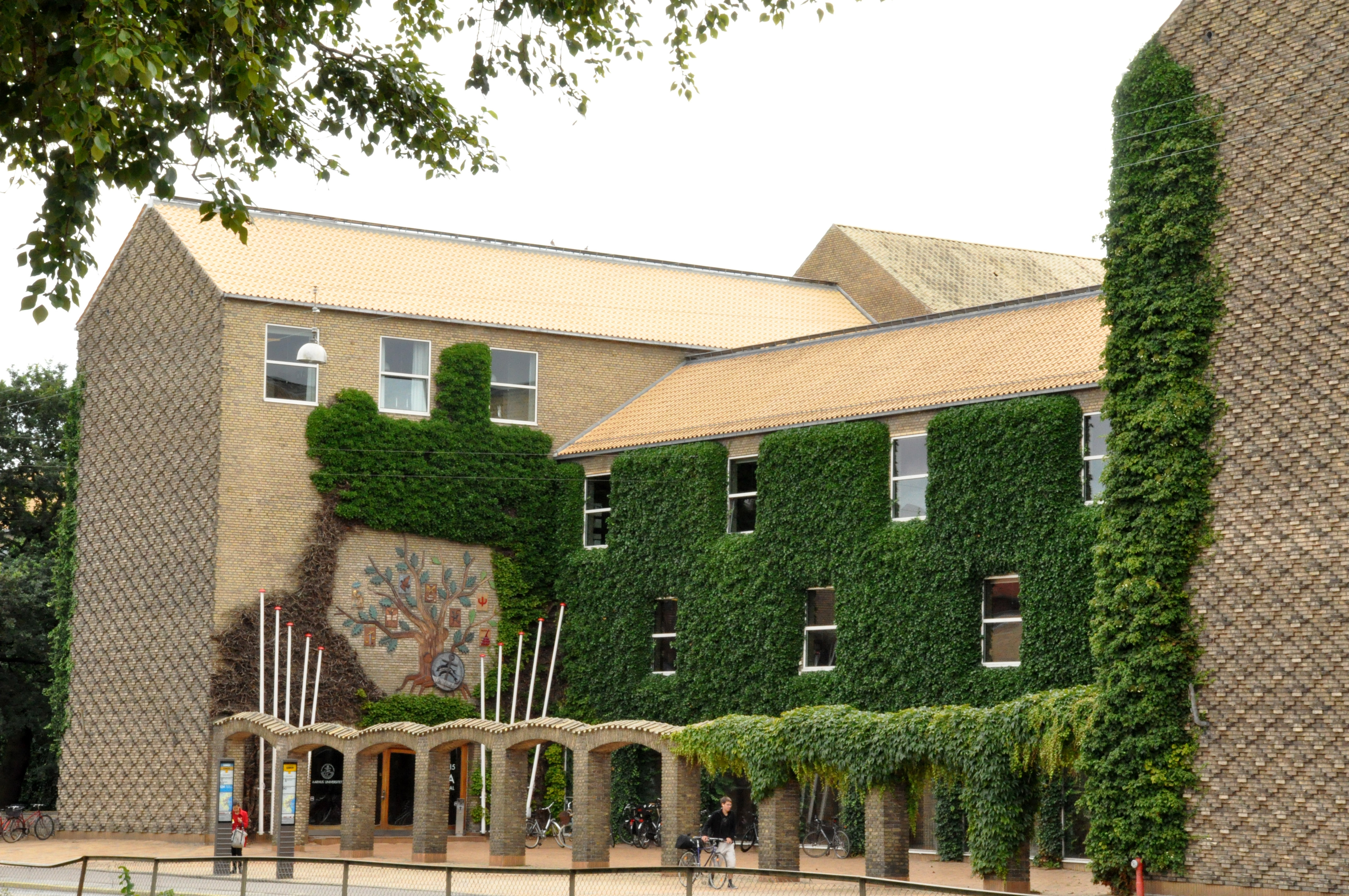
Department of Law, part of The Main Building.

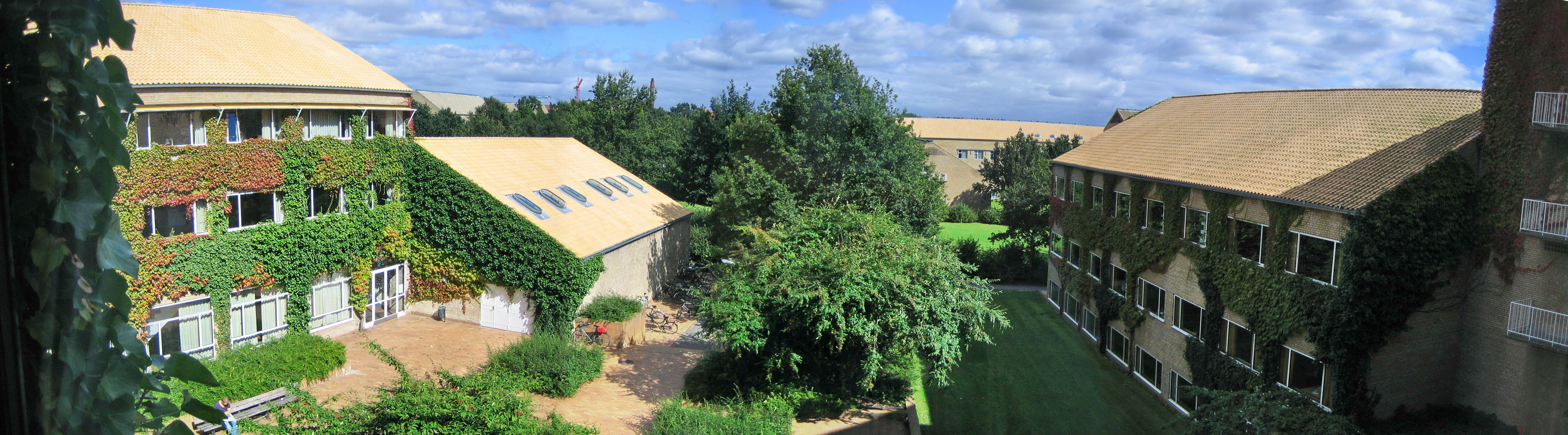
Department of Mathematics

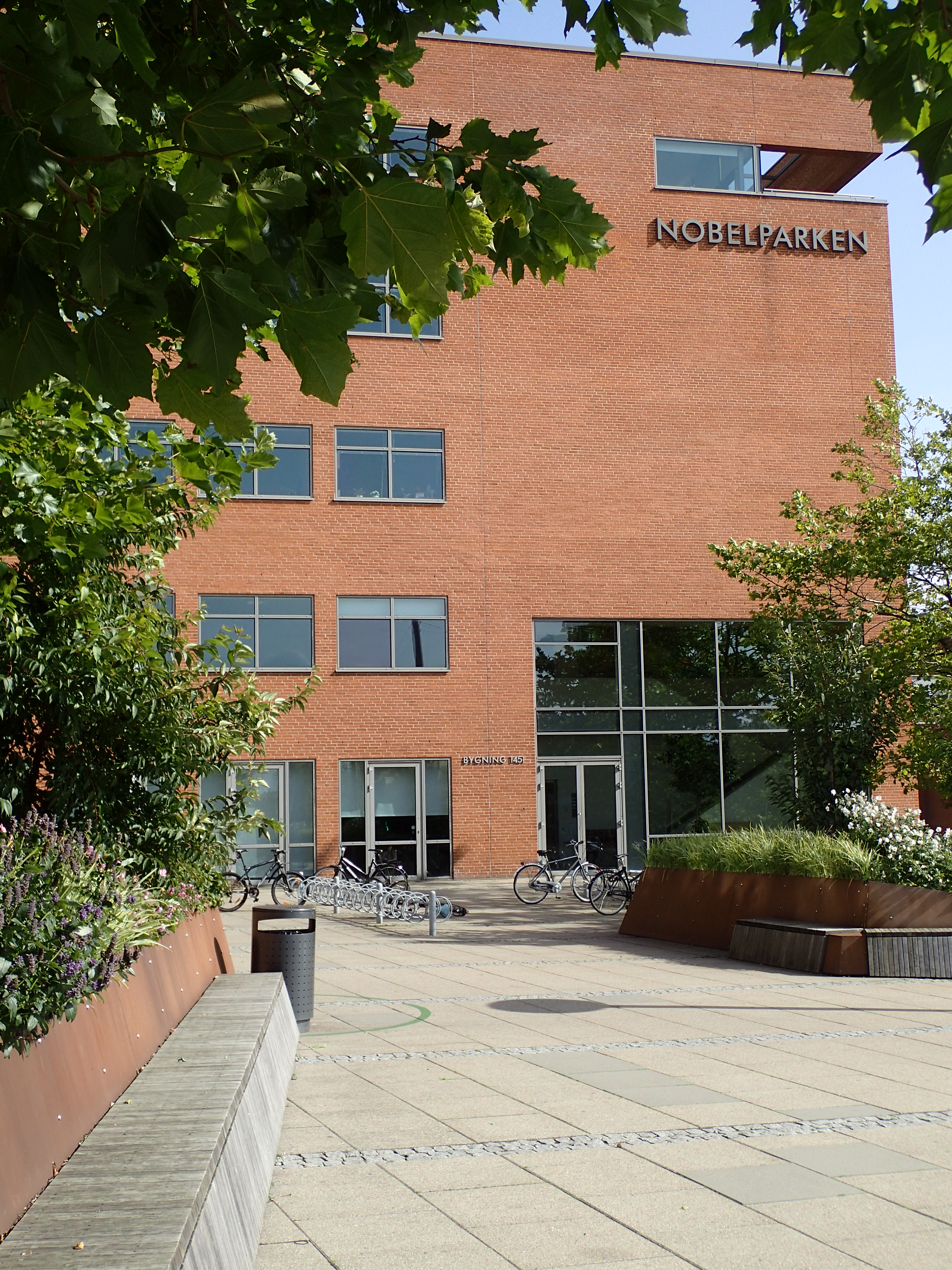
Nobelparken, Aarhus Faculty of Arts

As of 1 October 2021, more than 32,000 students were enrolled in Aarhus University. Each year more than 1000 international exchange students come to Aarhus University to study for one or two terms. In 2009 close to 3000 international students were enrolled in full degree programmes. Aarhus University is an international university with a large proportion of students at the post-baccalaureate level: over half of its students are enrolled in master's degree and PhD programmes. In 2011, 59 of the university's 113 Master's degree programmes were taught in English. Talent development of young researchers has been identified as one of the university's core activities. This means that highly qualified students have the option of starting their PhD studies before completing their master's degree. The university's doctoral programmes allow talented students to enroll in a combined Master's/PhD programme either right after completing the master's degree (the 5+3 track) or one year into their master's degree programme (the 4+4 track). Since 2006 the number of PhD students has risen from approximately 1000 to approximately 1700 in 2010.

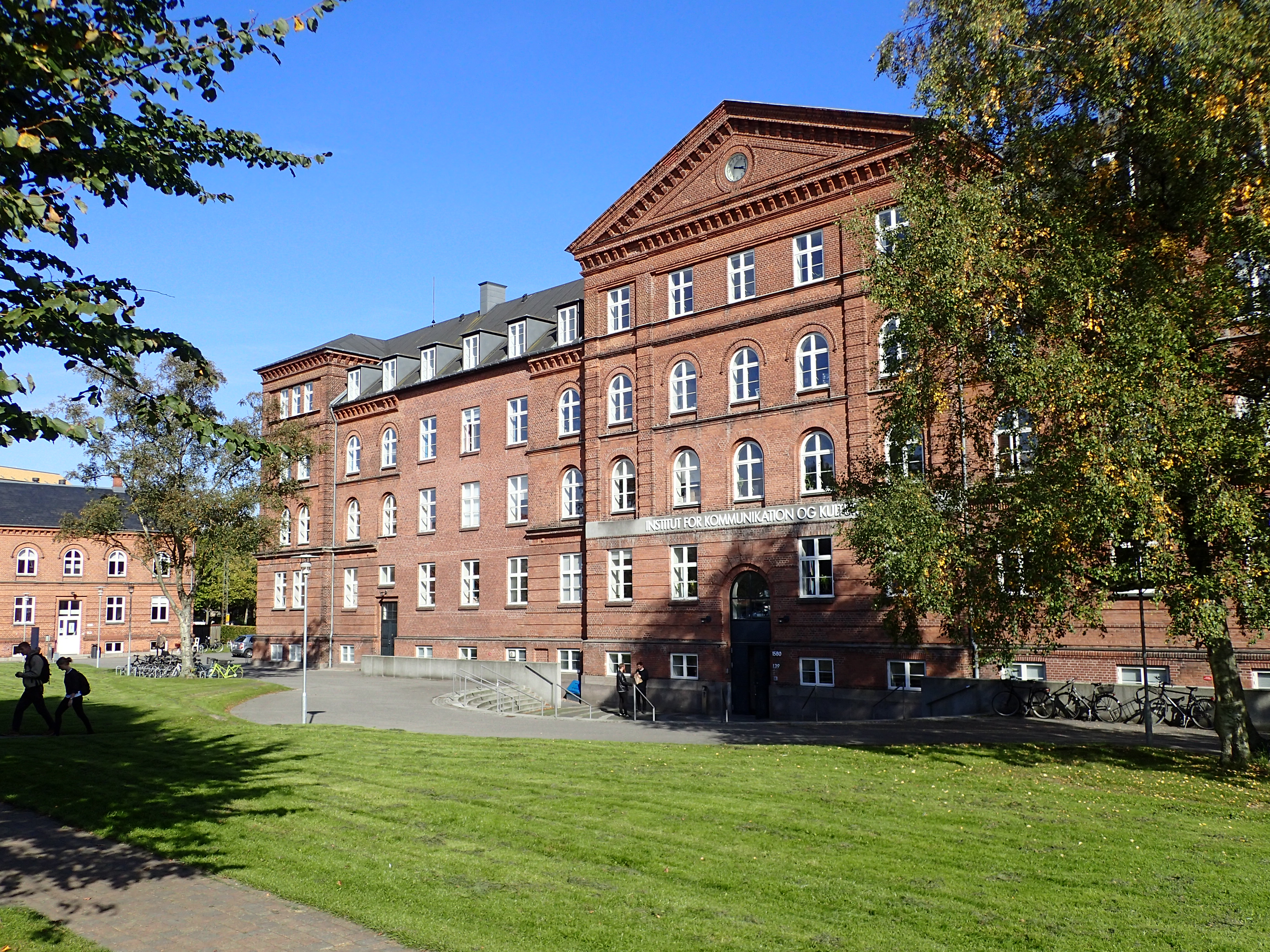
Aarhus University, School of Communication and Culture, Arts

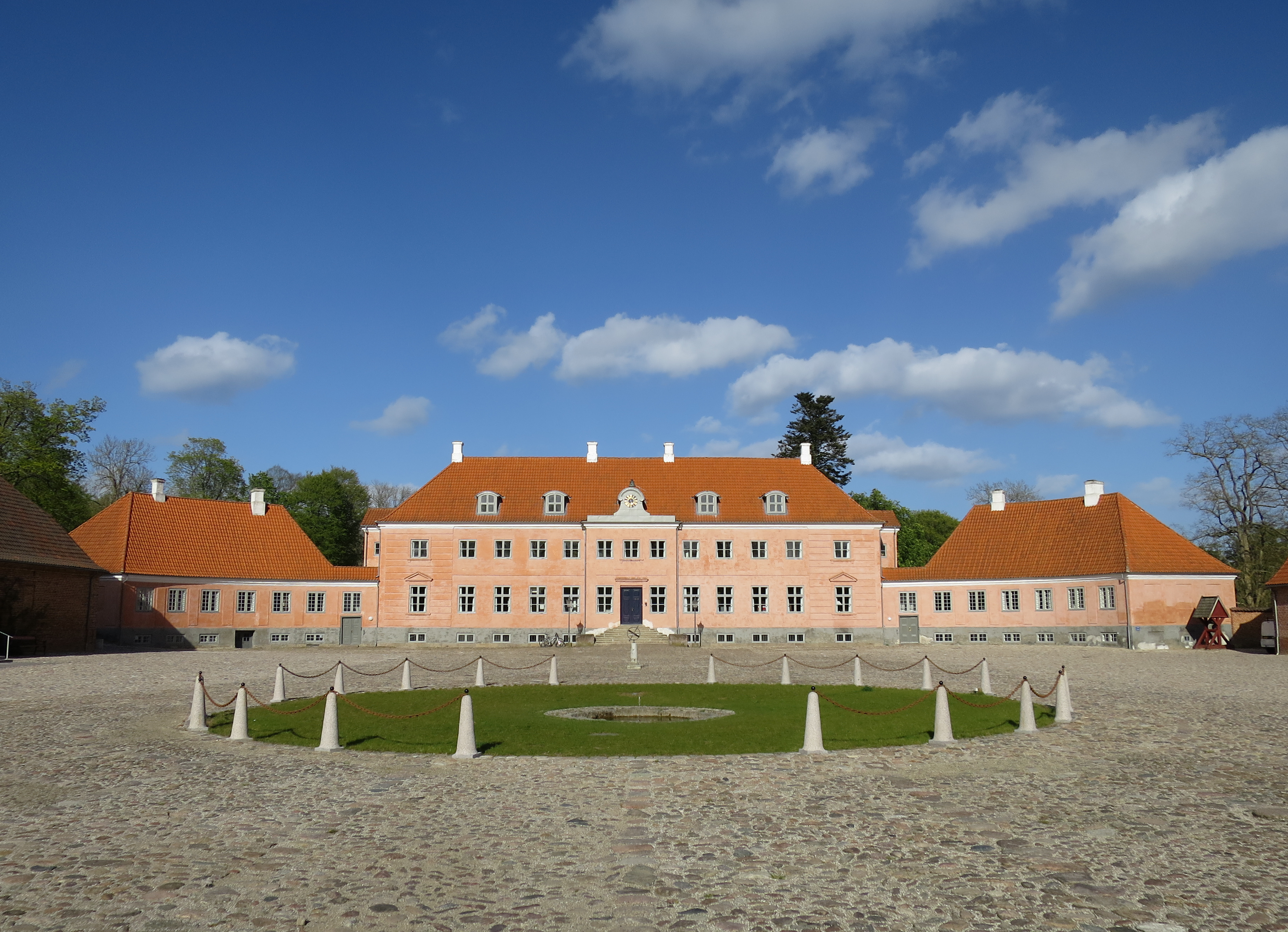
Moesgård Manor, Department of Archaeology and Anthropology, Arts

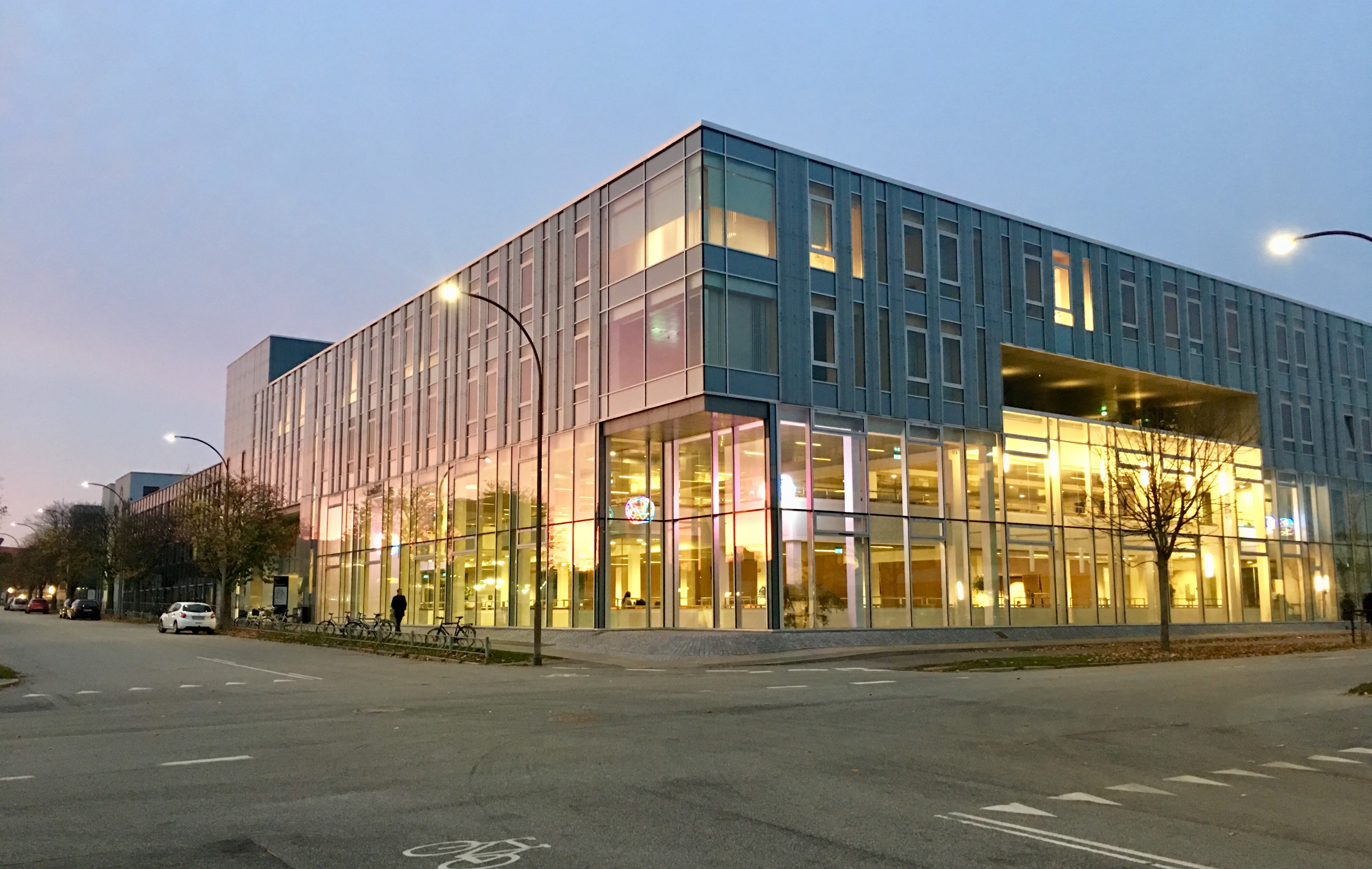
Department of Computer Science, AU, Science and Technology

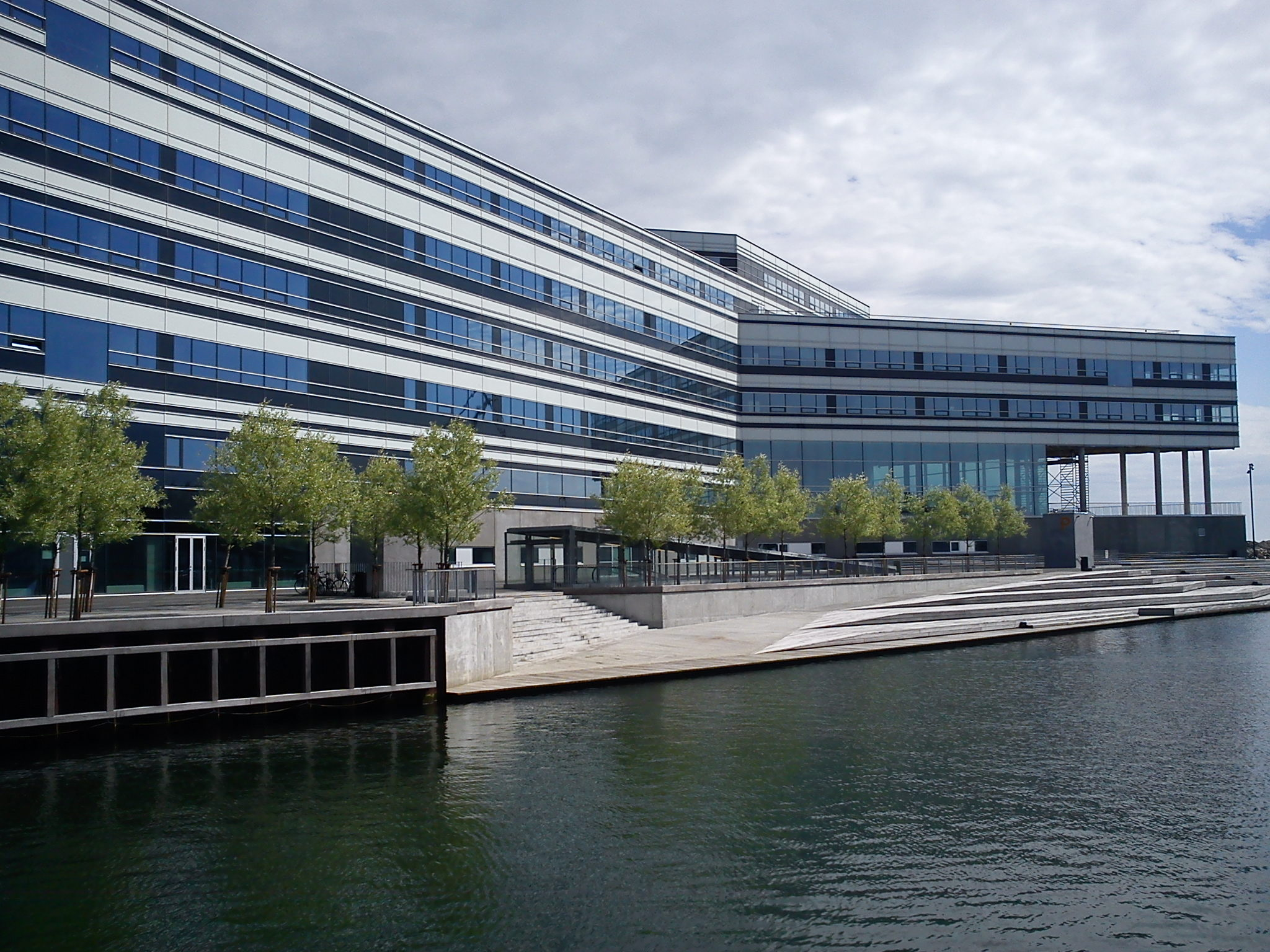
AU Engineering, Science and Technology

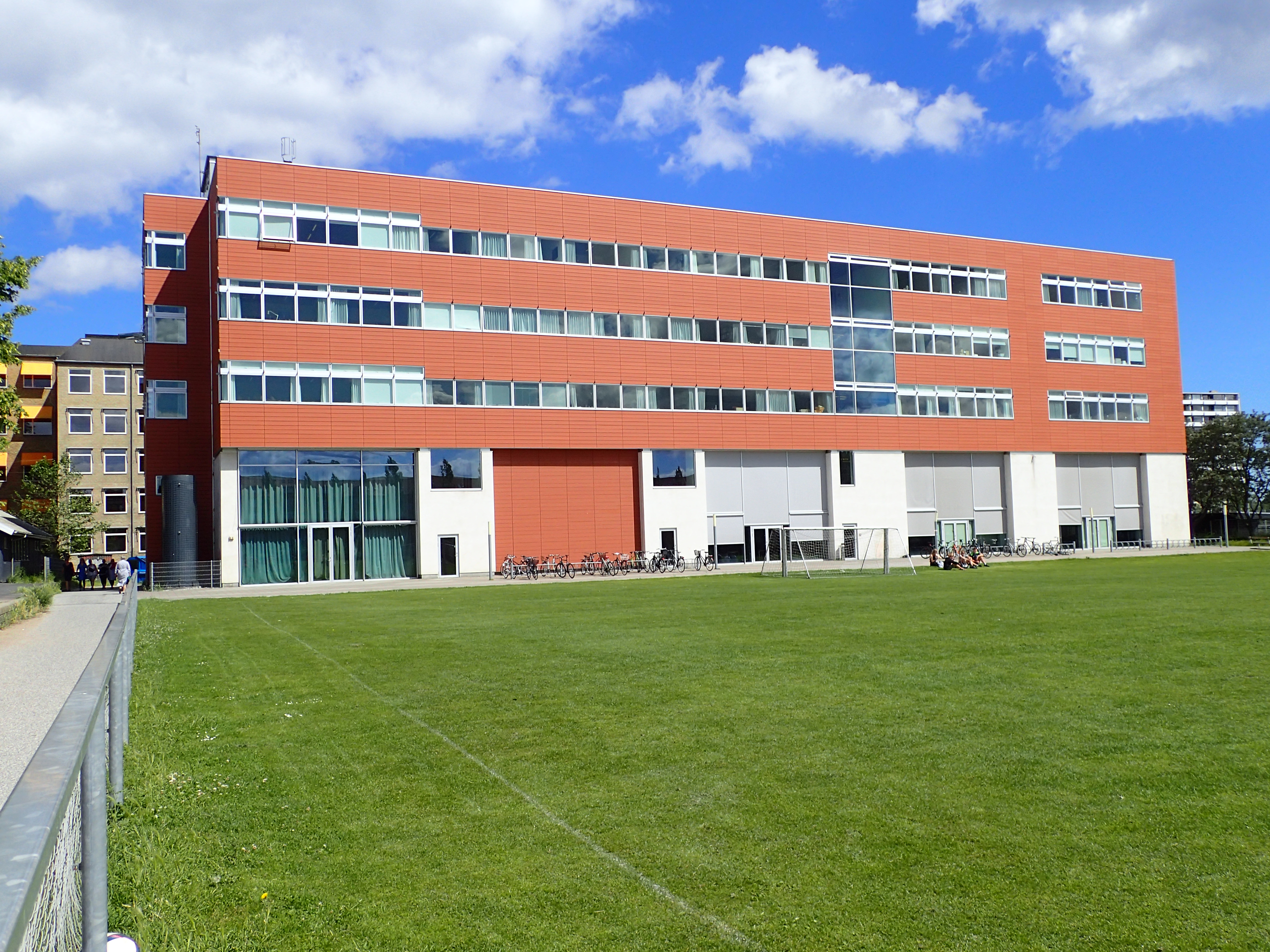
Section for Sports, Faculty of Health Sciences

=== International Centre ===
The International Centre maintains international partnerships and combines a wide range of services for exchange students, international full-degree students, PhDs and visiting scholars. The International Centre is often the first stop for foreign students at Aarhus University, since the centre offers advice on finding housing and living in Denmark.

=== AU Summer University ===
Starting in 2011 all summer courses and summer schools offered by Aarhus University for bachelor's, master's and PhD students will be gathered together and expanded to provide more diversity in a new framework: AU Summer University. In the summer of 2011 more than 80 courses were offered within the fields of humanities, theology, social sciences, health sciences, natural sciences, agricultural sciences, business and educational sciences. Summer courses are open to both Danish and international students.

=== Degree programmes ===
Aarhus University has seen some deep administrational changes since the turn of the century and now also includes several large sub-departments such as Aarhus BSS, AU Engineering and others. Each of these sub-departments offers undergraduate or graduate programmes specific to their own field of study. The core academic degree programmes of Aarhus University include the following fields:

- Agricultural Sciences
- Anthropology
- Biology
- Chemistry
- Chinese
- Classical Archaeology
- Classical Philology
- Cognitive Science
- Cognitive Semiotics
- Comparative Religion
- Computer Science
- Dentistry
- Digital Design
- Economics
- Engineering
- European Studies
- Food Science
- Geology
- Geophysics
- History
- History of Ideas
- Information Studies
- IT/IT Product Development
- Japanese
- Latin
- Law
- Linguistics
- Management
- Mathematical Economics
- Mathematics
- Media Studies
- Medicine
- Prehistoric, Medieval and Renaissance Archaeology
- Modern Languages
- Molecular Biology
- Musicology
- Nanotechnology
- Nordic Language and Literature
- Philosophy
- Physics and Astronomy
- Political Science
- Psychology
- Religious Studies
- Russian
- Scandinavian Studies
- Sports Science
- Theology
- The Religious Roots of Europe

The university offers eight undergraduate and about 60 graduate programmes in English.

=== Cheminova controversy and academic freedom at AU ===
Since 1944, Aarhus University owned Cheminova, a chemical manufacturer which, among other controversies, has been selling methyl parathion pesticide to Brazil farmers. In 2009, senior researcher Mette Jensen emailed her colleagues at AU, asking whether they thought Cheminova should stop selling the controversial pesticides. For this, the university threatened her with dismissal. The university's Pro-Vice-Chancellor Søren E. Frandsen denied that the university had made any mistakes or threatened the freedom of speech and academic freedom of its staff.

On 30 April 2015, Cheminova was sold to the FMC Corporation for DKK 8.5 billion, a controversial issue in itself.

== Major research centres ==
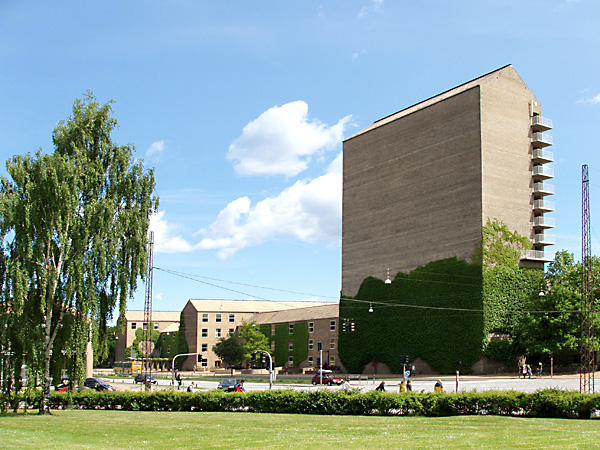
Royal Danish Library, Aarhus, at the university campus

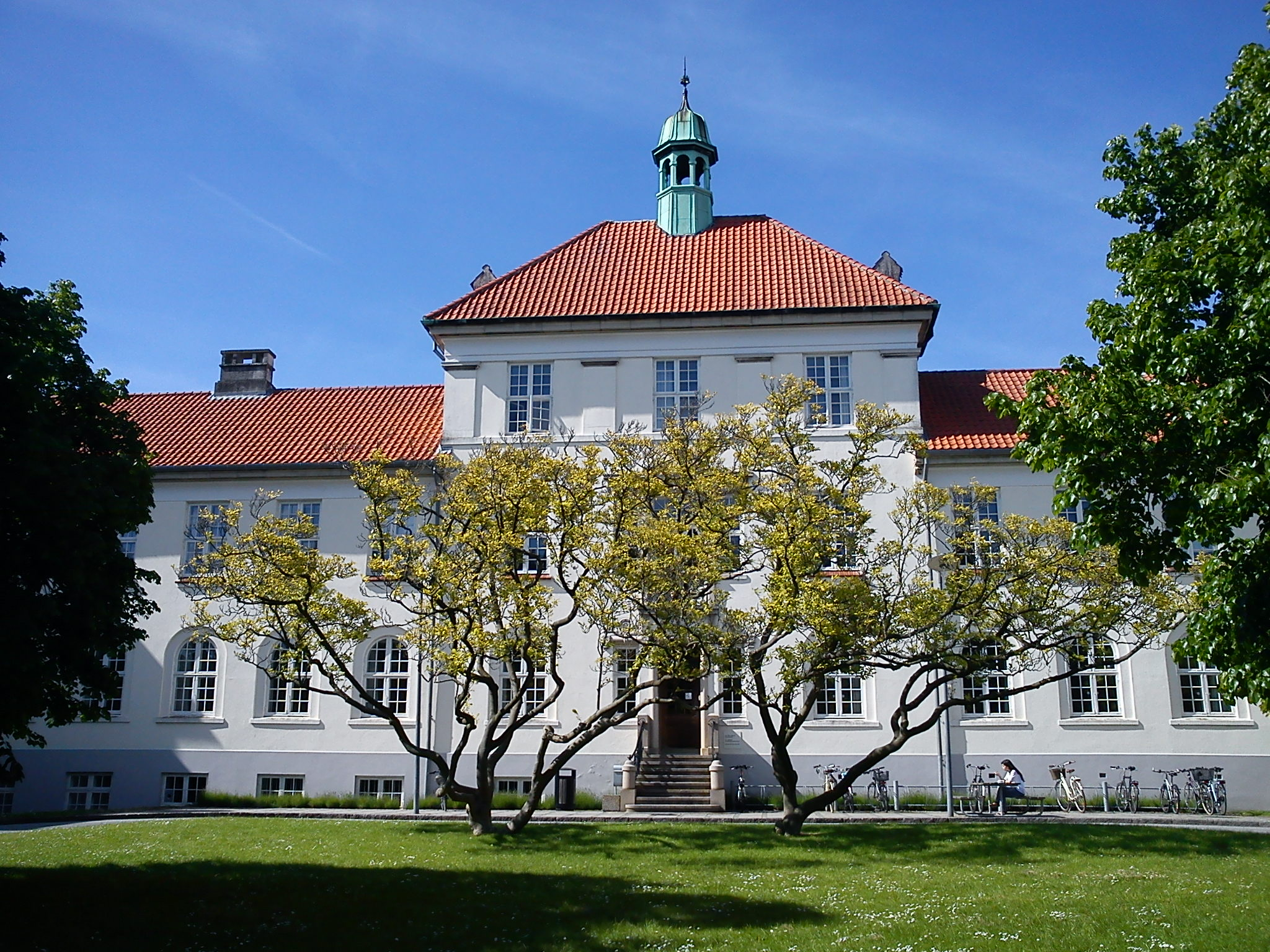
The Victor Albeck building, administrative centre and library of the Health faculty, Aarhus University

Aarhus University is home to 15 Centres of Excellence supported by the Danish National Research Foundation and a considerable number of major research centres. The 15 Centres of Excellence are:

- Centre for Membrane Pumps in Cells and Disease (PUMPKIN)
- Centre for Insoluble Protein Structures (INSPIN)
- Centre for Geomicrobiology
- Centre for Materials Crystallography (CMC)
- Centre for DNA Nanotechnology
- Centre for Functionally Integrative Neuroscience (CFIN)d
- Centre on Autobiographical Memory Research (CON AMORE)
- Centre for Massive Data Algorithmics (MADALGO)
- The Water and Salt Research Centre
- Centre for Carbonate Recognition and Signaling (CARB)
- Centre for Research in Econometric Analysis of Time Series (CREATES) which is one of the best econometrics center according to Economics Field Rankings: Econometrics | IDEAS/RePEc. Currently this center is positioned as second best center of research in econometric time series analysis.
- Centre for Oxygen Microscopy and Imaging (COMI)
- Centre for mRNP Biogenesis and Metabolism
- Centre for Quantum Geometry of Moduli Spaces (QGM)
- Centre for the Theory of Interactive Computation
- Center for Theoretical Chemistry (qLEAP)
- Centre for the Experimental-Philosophical Study of Discrimination （CEPDISC）

Some of the university's other major research centres include MindLab and iNANO.

=== MINDlab ===
MINDLAB was established with a DKK 120 million grant awarded by the Danish Ministry of Science, Technology and Innovation. At MINDLab neuroscientists, psychologists, biologists, statisticians and researchers from other fields work together to understand the brain, its disorders, and its development through physical and social interactions – and vice versa.

=== iNANO ===
The Interdisciplinary Nanoscience Center (founded in 2002 by Professor Flemming Besenbacher) offers a degree programme in nanoscience with an interdisciplinary curriculum covering a broad spectrum of introductory, advanced and specialised courses, aimed at providing the student with a sufficiently broad basis to conduct interdisciplinary research within nanoscience and at the same time achieve disciplinary depth and specialised skills in selected areas. Hence, the programme encompasses physics, chemistry, biology, molecular biology, mathematics and computer science.

=== Danish Centre for Environment and Energy (DCE) ===
In 2011 the National Environmental Research Institute of Denmark (NERI) was organisatorically moved from the Danish Ministry of Environment and Energy and merged into AU, under the new name Danish Centre for Environment and Energy (DCE). DCE consists of two departments: department of Ecoscience and Department of Environmental Sciences, as well as a common secretariat, all under the Faculty of Technical Sciences. The core obligations of DCE continues to be to provide research based monitoring and advice to the Danish Government on environmental issues and conduct independent research and education within the same fields.

=== Danish Centre for Food and Agriculture (DCA) ===
Also in 2011 the Agricultural Research Institute of the Ministry of Agriculture was merged into AU. First as a separate faculty for Agricultural Research, later as part of the Faculty of Technical Sciences. The former departments are now organised as Departments of Agroecology, Animal Sciences, and Food Science, together with a common secretariat: Danish Centre for Food and Agriculture (DCA). The core obligations of DCA is to provide advice and supporting research to the Ministry of Agriculture and Fisheries, while the departments also engage in independent research and teaching. The Global Rust Reference Center provides testing and investigation services of new and difficult cases of wheat stem rust/black stem rust.

== Student life ==
Students from different fields meet in the numerous Friday bars and at various events organized by student organizations. The Friday bars are often organised by students from the different departments who set up a small, local bar in a canteen or classroom where beers and non-alcoholic drinks are served. The university also offers the Student bar (Studenterbaren) though Studenterhus Aarhus.

The university also has a number of libraries, some of which are open around the clock with student or employee cards. Almost every department has its own library, but the main library is the State and University Library. It has an extensive electronic journal database which students and staff can access either at the library or from home.

Aarhus University Sports (AUS) is open to all university students and organises a wide range of activities from badminton, to fencing and chess.

=== Student organisations ===
The largest student organisations at Aarhus University are the Student Union (Studenterrådet ved Aarhus Universitet) and Studenterlauget. The Student Union represents the main student body at Aarhus University in many boards and forums, while Studenterlauget is a mainly social organisation at School of Business and Social Sciences. The Student Union has both student seats on the university board. The Student Union also arranges annual concerts and seminars, and publishes the student magazine Delfinen (The Dolphin).

Besides the Student Union, there are political student organisations at the university often connected to the Danish political parties, the largest of which include the Social-Democratic Students (Frit Forum), Conservative Students (Konservative Studenter), and Liberal Students (Liberale Studerende). The Conservative Students union publishes the student magazine Critique. The Liberal Students union publishes the leaflet Minerva.

=== Clubs and societies ===
Aarhus University offers many activities and services for foreign and Danish students. Several "Friday Bars", clubs organized and crewed by students at the university offer cheap beer and drinks, which has a wide appeal to the student body.

==== Students House ====
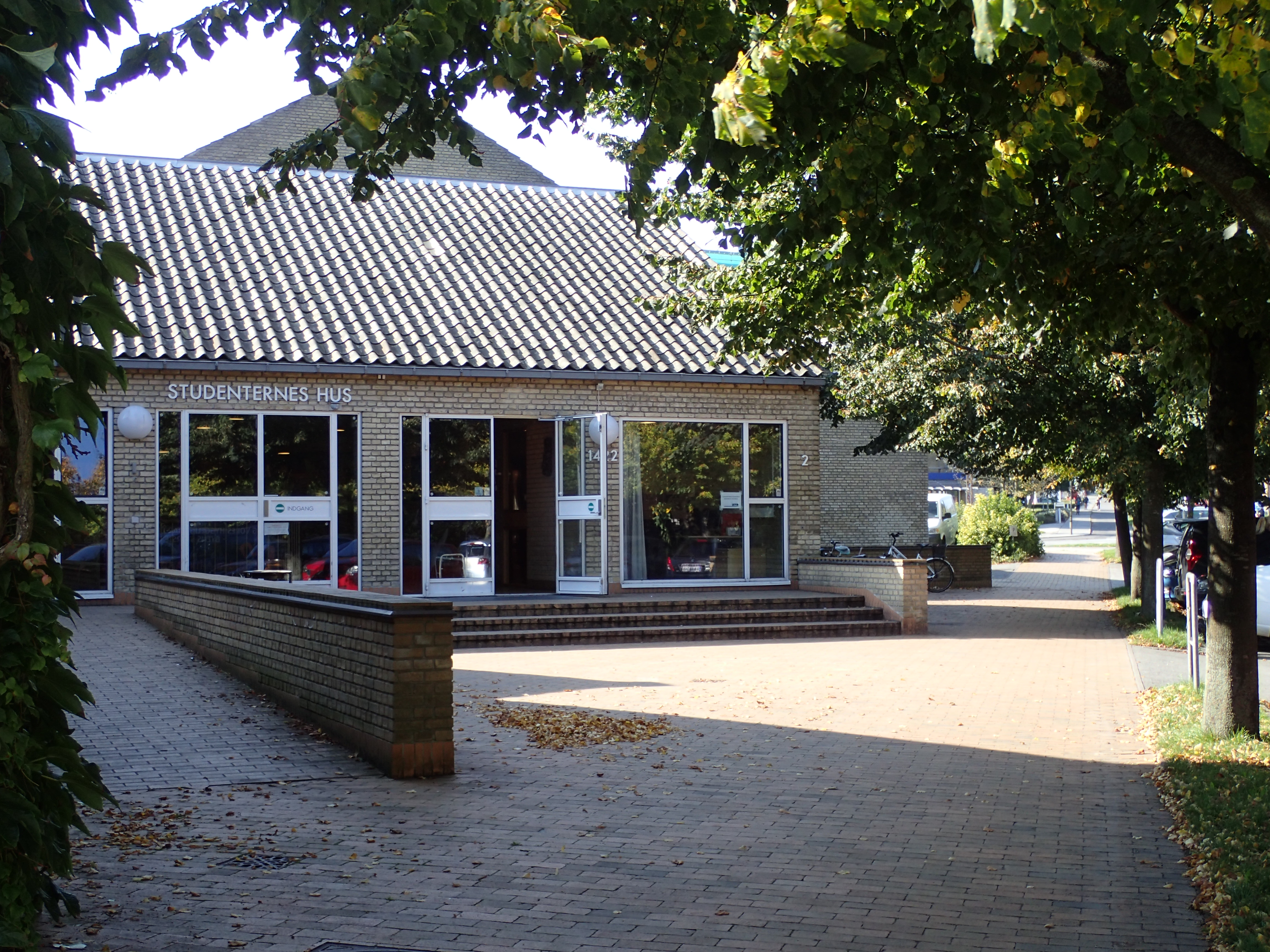
Studenternes Hus (The Students House), built in 1964

Studenternes Hus (The Students House) was built in 1964 at the central campus to accommodate students organisations, activities, festivities and gatherings. Among many other things, the buildings are headquarters to the students organisation Studenterhus Aarhus, and Aarhus University offers a free membership to all exchange students. The Students House is a meeting place for international and Danish students in Aarhus and Studenterhus Aarhus organize social and cultural activities throughout the year, ranging from parties and road trips, to language classes and weekly international nights (a popular dinner club). The Students' House including the Student bar used to be run by the independent Studenterhusfonden, but was taken over by the university itself in 2020.

==== Aarhus University Sports (AUS) ====
AUS is the official sports club of Aarhus University, and is open to all university students. It is an umbrella organisation consisting of 18 independent member clubs, which host a wide range of activities, from badminton to fencing to chess. In addition, AUS also offers independent activities such as indoor soccer tournaments, badminton facilities, and surfing trips.

==== Dale's Café ====
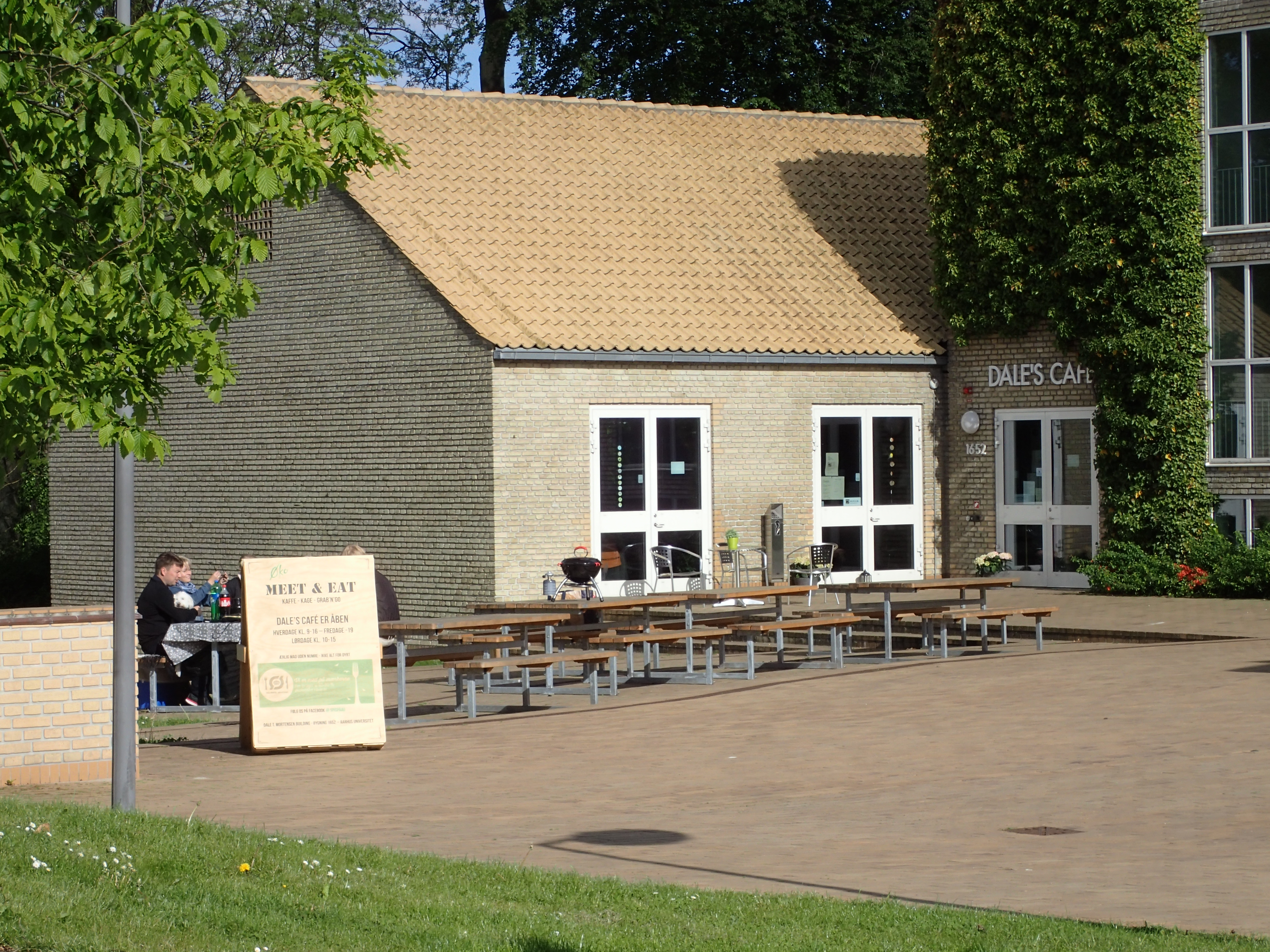
Dale's Café

Dale's Café is a meeting place for international students and the university's PhD students that opened in 2011. The café offers coffee, sandwiches and a wide selection of beers. It has an informal lounge area where students and young researchers can relax while enjoying snacks and beverages. Like the main building, Dale's Café is named after Aarhus University's 2010 Nobel Laureate in Economic Sciences, Dale T. Mortensen. The Dale T. Mortensen Building houses the International Centre, the PhD House and the IC Dormitory, which contains 28 dorm rooms and two apartments dedicated to recently arrived international PhD students.

==== Klubben ====
Klubben (in English 'the club') is a bar located at the former ASB (Aarhus School of Business), now under the faculty of School of Business and Social Sciences. The bar is open during regular school hours and weekdays, but hosts larger parties during Fridays and in relation to major sports events. Admittance is usually restricted to students of the School of Business and Social Sciences.

==== Studenterlauget ====
Studenterlauget, School of Business and Social Sciences (at the former ASB) is currently the largest student organisation in Denmark. The organisation has approximately 4,000 members whom they service through nine smaller "business units". Studenterlauget has around 300 student employees.

== University museums ==
Aarhus University operates a number of museums, both in and outside the university campus:

- Moesgaard Museum (MOMU)
- Steno Museum
- Ole Rømer Observatory
- Aarhus Botanical Gardens and greenhouses
- Natural History Museum
- Museum of Ancient Art

== Notable faculty and alumni, and students ==
=== Former and current faculty ===
- Torben M. Andersen, professor, former chairman of the Welfare Commission
- Lars Arge, Danish computer scientist
- Ole Barndorff-Nielsen, Danish statistician
- Susanne Bødker, Danish computer scientist
- Jørgen Christensen-Dalsgaard, Danish astronomer
- Ivan Damgård, Danish cryptographer
- Jennifer Kewley Draskau, Manx historian, linguist, teacher and political candidate
- Tom Fenchel, Danish marine ecologist
- David Field, physicist
- Albert Gjedde, Danish-Canadian Neuroscientist
- David Gress, Danish-American historian
- Poul Jørgensen (chemist), Director of the qLEAP center for theoretical chemistry
- Selin Kara, full professor and head of Industrial Biotechnology section
- Kai Larsen, Danish botanist
- Knud Ejler Løgstrup, Danish philosopher and theologian, Pastor at Sandager-Holevad from 1936 to 1943, professor at University of Aarhus from 1943 to 1975
- Ib Madsen, Danish mathematician
- Birte Melsen, Danish Orthodontist
- Bertel Møhl, Danish marine zoologist and physiologist
- Jeremy Morris, British ethnographer and political anthropologist
- Helmuth Nyborg, Danish professor of developmental psychology
- Kristen Nygaard, Norwegian computer scientist (1975–1976), Turing Award
- Kjeld Philip, Danish economist and politician
- Rubina Raja, Professor of Classical Archaeology and leader of The Danish National Research Foundation's Center of Excellence for Urban Network Evolutions
- Katherine Richardson, Biological oceanographer
- Jens Christian Skou, Danish chemist and Nobel Prize laureate in Chemistry 1997
- Johannes Sløk, Danish philosopher and theologian
- Benjamin K. Sovacool, director of the Center for Energy Technology at AU-Herning and a professor of social sciences
- Harald Thamdrup, Danish zoologist
- Gunnar Svane, Danish linguist

=== Alumni ===
- Yildiz Akdogan, (MSc in political science 2006) Danish politician, Member of the Danish Parliament since 2007.
- Morten Albæk, (MA in history (minor in philosophy) former group senior vice president i Vestas Wind Systems, named one of the 100 most innovative marketing leaders in 2011, 2012 and 2013 by the magazine, The Internationalist.
- Svend Auken, (MSc in political science 1969) Danish politician. Chairman of the Danish Social Democrats 1987–1992.
- Dorete Bloch, (MSc in zoology 1970) Danish zoologist.
- Tim Bollerslev, (MSc in economics and mathematics 1983) Danish Econometrician. Inventor of the GARCH model.
- Jens-Peter Bonde, Danish journalist, author, politician, and Member of the European Parliament 1979–2008.
- Michael E. Caspersen, (MS 1987, PhD 2007), Danish computer scientist and educator
- John Degnbol-Martinussen (PhD) political scientist.
- Annelise Ebbe (MA), Danish peace activist and translator
- John Frandsen, (MA in music 1982) Danish composer, organist and conductor.
- Aage Frandsen, Danish politician, Member of the Danish Parliament 1971–1975, 1987–1990, and 1994–2005.
- Lone Frank, Danish Science Journalist (MSc in Biology 1992)
- King Frederik X, (MSc in political science 1995), King of Denmark since 2024.
- Søren Gade, (MSc in economics 1990) Danish politician, Minister of Defence and Member of the Danish Parliament.
- Lene Hau, (MSc 1986, PhD 1991 in physics) Danish physicist.
- Bertel Haarder, (MSc in political science 1971) Danish politician, Member of the Danish Parliament.
- Niels Jacobsen, (Msc in economics 1983) CEO of William Demant
- Dan Jørgensen, (MSc in political science) Danish politician. Member of the European Parliament since 2004.
- Naser Khader, Danish-Syrian politician and Member of the Danish Parliament. Chairman of the Liberal Alliance 2007–2009.
- Lars Bak, Computer Programmer, Developer of JavaScript V8 Engine.
- Lars Knudsen, (MSc 1992, PhD 1994) Danish cryptographer.
- Jørgen Vig Knudstorp, (MSc 1995, PhD in 1998 in Economics) CEO of the Lego Group
- Johannes Lebech (MA), Danish politician.
- Bjørn Lomborg, (MSc in political science 1991) Danish author, academic and environmentalist.
- Nils Malmros, (MD 1988) Danish film director and screenwriter.
- Madhavan Mukund, Director of Chennai Mathematical Institute, India.
- Ebbe Nielsen, (MSc in Zoology 1976) Danish entomologist.
- Kjeld Philip, (MSc in economics) Danish economist and politician.
- Anders Fogh Rasmussen, (MSc in Economics 1978) Prime Minister of Denmark from 2001 until 2009. Secretary General of NATO from August 2009 until October 2014.
- Lars Rasmussen (software developer), (MSc in Mathematics and Computer Science 1990) Danish computer scientist, software developer, and co-founder of Google Maps.
- Høgni Reistrup, (BA in Media studies and Organisational Development 2008 from Aarhus University and MA in Media Studies 2010 from the University of Copenhagen), co-writer of the book Exit Føroyar which created debate about the declining population in the Faroe Islands.
- Jan Beyer Schmidt-Sørensen (Msc in Economics 1983 from Aarhus University and PhD in 1990 in Economics from Aarhus School of Business) former Rector of Aarhus School of Business (now Aarhus University, School of Business and Social Sciences) and Director of Business Development at Aarhus Municipality.
- Tøger Seidenfaden, (MSc in political science 1983) Danish journalist. Editor-in-chief at Politiken 1993–2011.
- Bjarne Stroustrup, (MSc in Mathematics and Computer Science 1975) Danish inventor, designer and original implementer of the C++ programming language.
- Folmer Wisti, founder of the Danish Cultural Institute
- Queen Margrethe II, the queen regnant of Denmark from 1972 to 2024, studied archaeology and political science during 1961–1962.
- Jens Peter Christensen, (MSc in political science in 1982 and Doctor of Law 1997). President of the Supreme Court since 1 November 2022.

== International recognition ==
University rankings

Global – Overall
- ARWU World: 78 (2023)
- QS World: 131 (2026)
- THE World: =109 (2024)
- USNWR Global: =109 (2023)

Aarhus University is highly ranked by international organizations and maintains its own page listing its current rankings. It is ranked 71st by the Shanghai Ranking (2021), 89th by National Taiwan University Ranking (2018), 95th by the U.S. News & World Report (2018), 106th by Times Higher Education World University Rankings (2021), and 155th by QS World University Rankings (2021).

== Partner universities and membership ==
Aarhus University is a member of the Coimbra Group and of the Utrecht Network.

Aarhus university is also an active member of the University of the Arctic. UArctic is an international cooperative network based in the Circumpolar Arctic region, consisting of more than 200 universities, colleges, and other organizations with an interest in promoting education and research in the Arctic region.

The university participates in UArctic's mobility program north2north. The aim of that program is to enable students of member institutions to study in different parts of the North.

== See also ==
- Annual Regatta at Aarhus University
- List of modern universities in Europe (1801–1945)
