= Aarhus Faculty of Health Sciences =

Coordinates: 56°10′00″N 10°12′17″E

Aarhus Faculty of Health Sciences, or simply Health, is one of four faculties at Aarhus University in Aarhus, Denmark. The head of Health is dean Lars Bo Nielsen.

Academic teaching in medicine began with the foundation of Aarhus University in 1933 and the Faculty of Health was created in 1992, when the Aarhus College of Dentistry merged. On 1 January 2011, large structural reforms and expansions came into effect at Aarhus University and the faculty was renamed Health. The faculty has worked closely with the Aarhus University Hospital since 1936.

== Departments ==
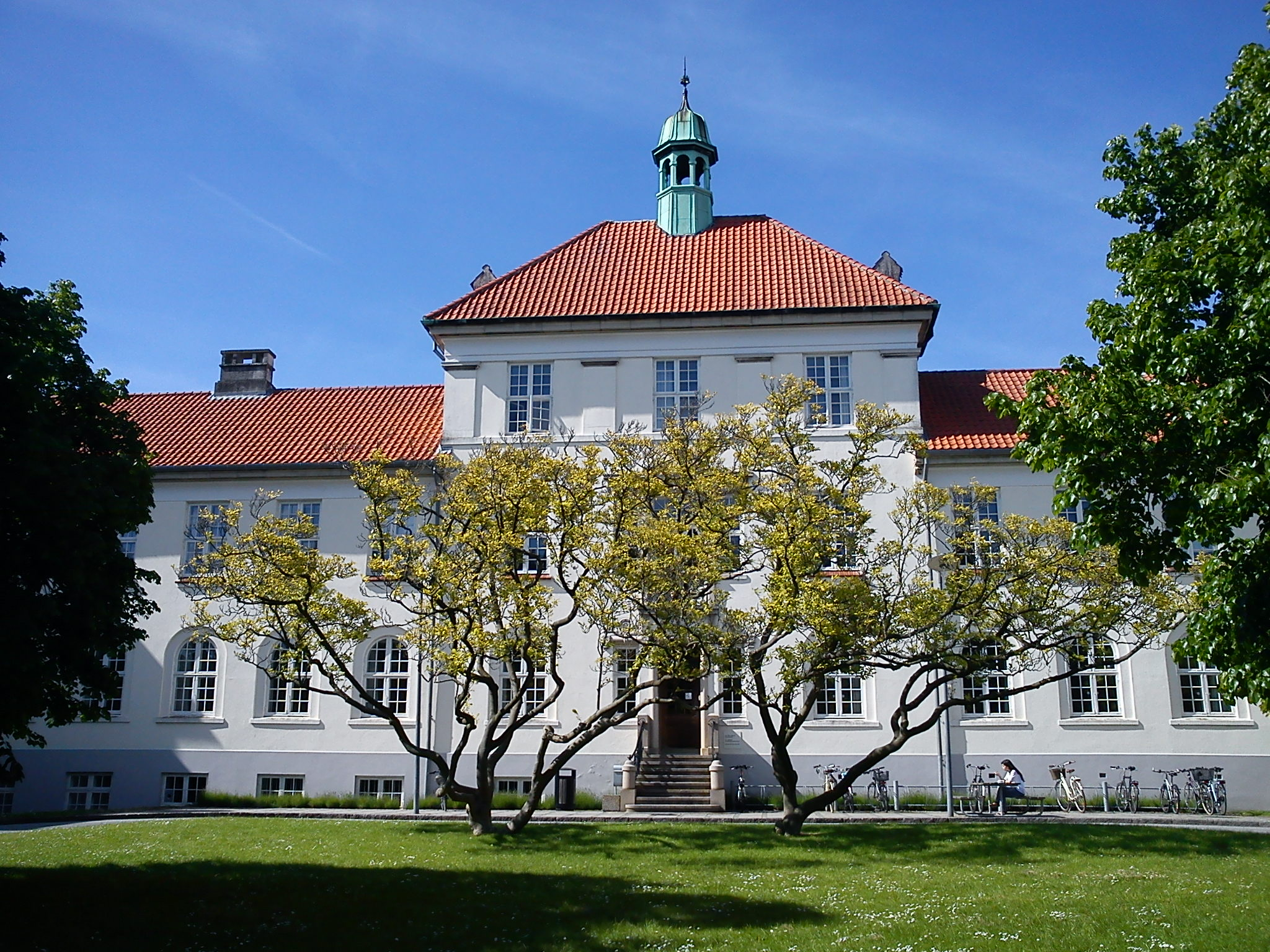
The Victor Albeck Building at the university main campus house the Health library and an education centre

Health comprise five academic areas and departments:

- Department of Biomedicine
- Department of Clinical Medicine
- Department of Dentistry and Oral Health
- Department of Forensic Medicine
- Department of Public Health

The faculty offer degree programs in all five academic areas.

== See also ==
- Aarhus University Hospital
