= Harald Thamdrup =

Danish biologist and science organizer

Harald Mogensen Thamdrup (17 May 1908 – 13 November 1998) was a Danish biologist and science organizer.

Thamdrup was a professor of zoology at Aarhus University 1959-1975 – the first in that chair. He also served as a director of the Natural History Museum, Aarhus 1941-1978 and founded the research station Mols Laboratory (Molslaboratoriet) in 1941 and in 1949 the Wildlife Biological Station (Vildtbiologisk Station) at Kalø which he led for 30 years.

== Biography ==
Thamdrup studied natural history at the University of Copenhagen and won a gold medal for his thesis on soil dwelling oribatid mites.

He obtained a dr. phil. degree in 1935 on his thesis about the intertidal fauna of the Wadden Sea. Thamdrup then turned to the study of soil fauna of heathland.

In 1959, he establishment the Department of Zoology at Aarhus University where he served as professor until 1975. Thamdrup was the chairman of the Danish committee under the International Biological Programme 1967-1974 and was in many other respects an organizational catalyst in Danish ecological research during the remainder of his professional life.
