= Aarhus University Faculty of Arts =

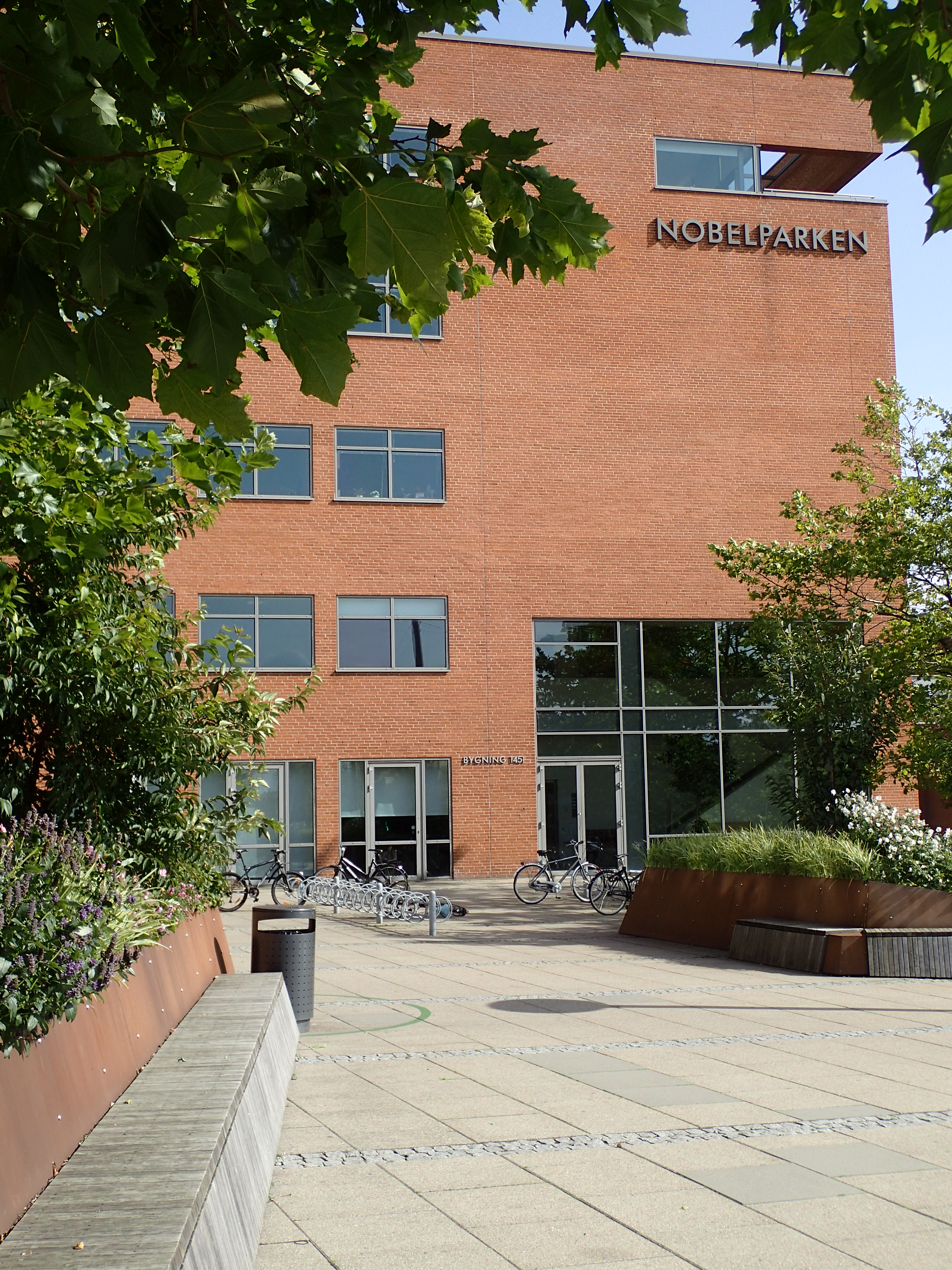
Nobelparken holds most of the departments of the Faculty of Arts

The Faculty of Arts, or simply Arts, is one of four main academic areas at Aarhus University. The faculty contributes to Aarhus University’s research, talent development, knowledge exchange and degree programmes.

With its 500 academic staff members, 260 PhD students, 12,500 BA and MA students, and 2,500 students following continuing/further education programmes, the faculty constitutes a strong and diverse research and teaching environment.

Arts is home to a wide range of disciplines and Interdisciplinary studies. On this basis, the faculty seeks to address the most urgent challenges facing society today. A commitment to interact with society and seek solutions to pressing social questions is balanced with an emphasis on contributing to basic research in the academic fields.

The Dean of Faculty of Arts, Aarhus University is Johnny Laursen (2015).

== History ==
Most of the departments have a long history as part of Aarhus University. The Faculty of Arts was established in 2011 when the former Faculty of Humanities, Faculty of Theology, and the Danish School of Education were merged. After the merge, Arts became the largest faculty for research and teaching on cultural and social practices in Northern Europe.

== Departments and centres ==
- School of Communication and Culture
- School of Culture and Society
- Danish School of Education
- Centre for Teaching Development and Digital Media
