= NP-intermediate =

Complexity class of problems

In computational complexity, problems that are in the complexity class NP but are neither in the class P nor NP-complete are called NP-intermediate, and the class of such problems is called NPI. Ladner's theorem, shown in 1975 by Richard E. Ladner, is a result asserting that, if P ≠ NP, then NPI is not empty; that is, NP contains problems that are neither in P nor NP-complete. Since it is also true that if NPI problems exist, then P ≠ NP, it follows that P = NP if and only if NPI is empty.

Under the assumption that P ≠ NP, Ladner explicitly constructs a problem in NPI, although this problem is artificial and otherwise uninteresting. It is an open question whether any "natural" problem has the same property: Schaefer's dichotomy theorem provides conditions under which classes of constrained Boolean satisfiability problems cannot be in NPI. Some problems that are considered good candidates for being NP-intermediate are the graph isomorphism problem, and decision versions of factoring and the discrete logarithm.

Under the exponential time hypothesis, there exist natural problems that require quasi-polynomial time, and can be solved in that time, including finding a large disjoint set of unit disks from a given set of disks in the hyperbolic plane, and finding a graph with few vertices that is not an induced subgraph of a given graph. The exponential time hypothesis also implies that no quasi-polynomial-time problem can be NP-complete, so under this assumption these problems must be NP-intermediate.

== List of problems that might be NP-intermediate ==
=== Algebra and number theory ===
- A decision version of factoring integers: for input $n$ and $k$, does $n$ have a factor in the interval $[2,k]$?
- Decision versions of the discrete logarithm problem and others related to cryptographic assumptions
- Linear divisibility: given integers $x$ and $y$, does $y$ have a divisor congruent to 1 modulo $x$?

=== Boolean logic ===
- IMSAT, the Boolean satisfiability problem for "intersecting monotone CNF": conjunctive normal form, with each clause containing only positive or only negative terms, and each positive clause having a variable in common with each negative clause
- Minimum circuit size problem: given the truth table of a Boolean function and positive integer $s$, does there exist a circuit of size at most $s$ for this function?
- Monotone dualization: given CNF and DNF formulas for monotone Boolean functions, do they represent the same function?
- Monotone self-duality: given a CNF formula for a Boolean function, is the function invariant under a transformation that negates all of its variables and then negates the output value?

=== Computational geometry and computational topology ===
- Determining whether the rotation distance between two binary trees or the flip distance between two triangulations of the same convex polygon is below a given threshold has long been conjectured to be NP-intermediate, until it was proven to be NP-hard in 2026
- The turnpike problem of reconstructing points on line from their distance multiset
- The cutting stock problem with a constant number of object lengths
- Knot triviality
- Finding a simple closed quasigeodesic on a convex polyhedron

=== Game theory ===
- Determining the winner in parity games, in which graph vertices are labeled by which player chooses the next step, and the winner is determined by the parity of the highest-priority vertex reached
- Determining the winner for stochastic graph games, in which graph vertices are labeled by which player chooses the next step, or whether it is chosen randomly, and the winner is determined by reaching a designated sink vertex.

=== Graph algorithms ===
- Graph isomorphism problem
- Finding a graph's automorphism group
- Finding the number of graph automorphisms
- Planar minimum bisection
- Deciding whether a graph admits a graceful labeling
- Recognizing leaf powers and k-leaf powers
- Recognizing graphs of bounded clique-width
- Testing the existence of a simultaneous embedding with fixed edges

=== Miscellaneous ===
- Testing whether the Vapnik–Chervonenkis dimension of a given family of sets is below a given bound
