= OVC =

OVC can stand for:

- Office for Victims of Crime, part of the U.S. Department of Justice
- Open Voting Consortium, a nonprofit group advocating for open-source electronic voting technology
- Ohio Valley College, later Ohio Valley University
- Ontario Veterinary College
- Ohio Valley Conference, an NCAA Division I college athletic conference
- Orphans and vulnerable children
- The Orthogonal Vectors Conjecture, in computational complexity theory and fine-grained complexity
