= Unknotting =

Unknotting may refer to:

- Unknotting number, the minimum number of times the knot must be passed through itself to untie it
- Unknotting problem, a mathematical problem
