= Pachner =

Pachner is a German surname. Notable people with the surname include:

- Lukas Pachner (born 1991), Austrian snowboarder
- Paul Pachner (1871–1937), Austro–Hungarian admiral
- Valerie Pachner (born 1987), Austrian actress
- William Pachner (1915–2017), Czech-born American painter

== See also ==
- Pachner moves, are also called bistellar flips (Geometric topology)
