= Edith Hemaspaandra =

Dutch-American theoretical computer scientist

Edith Hemaspaandra (née Spaan, born February 20, 1964) is a Dutch-American theoretical computer scientist whose research concerns computational social choice, the computational complexity theory of problems in social choice theory, and particularly on computational problems involving election manipulation. She is a professor of computer science at the Rochester Institute of Technology.

== Early life and education ==
Edith Spaan was born on February 20, 1964, in Schagen, and educated in computer science at the University of Amsterdam. She earned a bachelor's degree there in 1986, and a master's degree in 1988. She completed her Ph.D. in 1993, with the dissertation Complexity of Modal Logics combining complexity theory and modal logic, supervised by Johan van Benthem.

When she and her husband (formerly named Lane Hemachandra) married, they both changed their surname to Hemaspaandra.

== Career ==
After postdoctoral research at the University at Buffalo, supervised by Alan Selman, Hemaspaandra taught at Le Moyne College from 1993 until 1998. She took her present position at the Rochester Institute of Technology in 1998. She is a full professor in the Golisano College of Computing and Information Sciences at the Rochester Institute of Technology.
