= Naveen Garg =

Indian academic

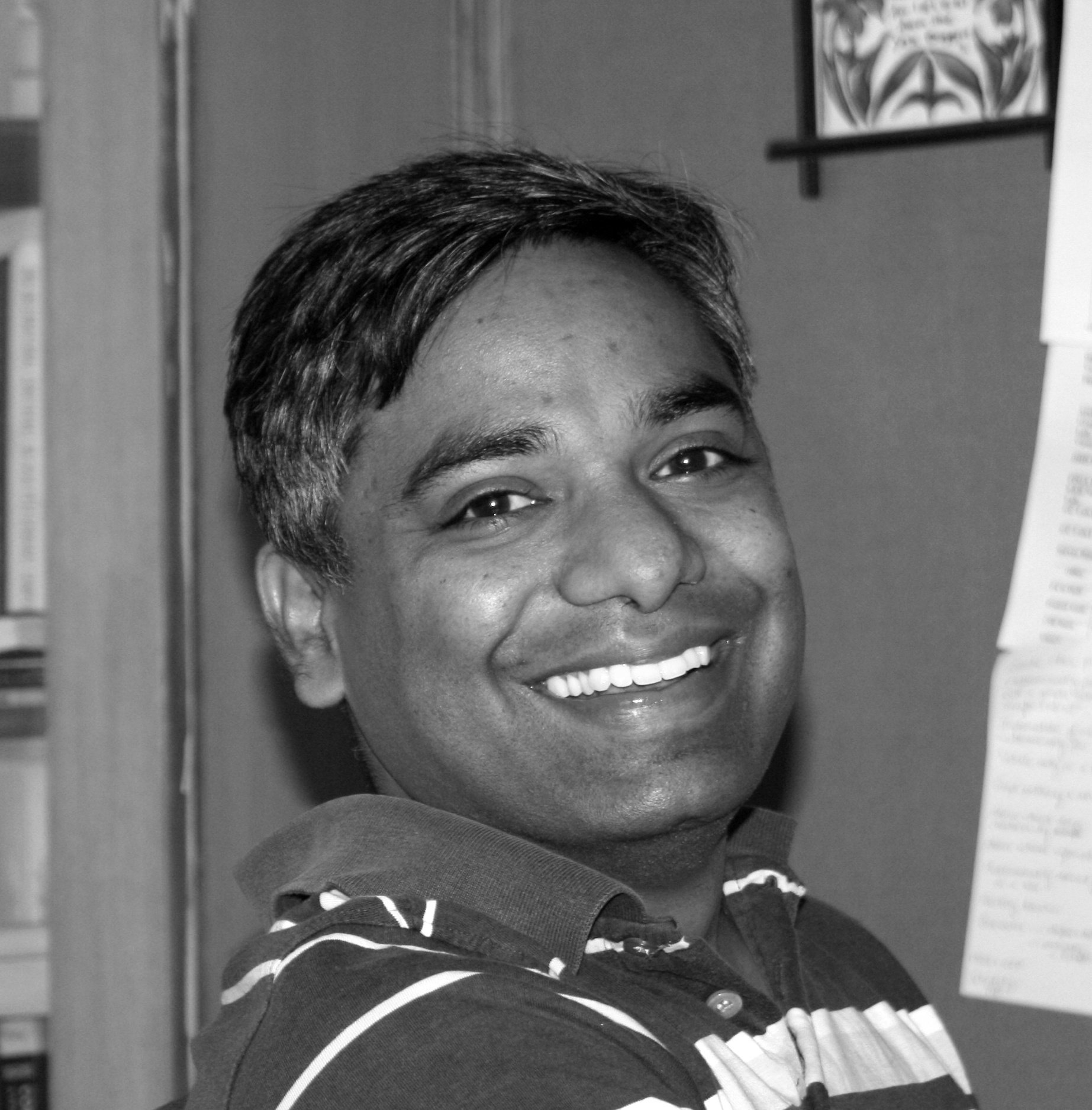
- Garg in 2012
- Born: March 12, 1971 (age 55); Lucknow, Uttar Pradesh, India
- Education: IIT, Delhi (BTech, PhD); Max Planck Institute for Informatics, Saarbrücken (PostDoc, Research Scientist)
- Awards: Shanti Swarup Bhatnagar Prize for Science and Technology (2016); Wilhelm Bessel Research Award (2001)
- Scientific career
- Fields: Approximation algorithms Computational Complexity; Optimization; Algorithmic game theory
- Workplaces: Indian Institute of Technology, Delhi (IIT, Delhi)
- Doctoral advisor: Vijay Vazirani
- Website: www.cse.iitd.ernet.in/~naveen/

Naveen Garg (born 12 March 1971) is a Professor of Computer Science in Indian Institute of Technology Delhi, specializing in algorithms and complexity in theoretical computer science. He was awarded the Shanti Swarup Bhatnagar Prize for Science and Technology, India's highest prize for excellence in science, mathematics and technology, in the mathematical sciences category in the year 2016. Naveen Garg's contributions are primarily in the design and analysis of approximation algorithms for NP-hard combinatorial optimization problems arising in network design, scheduling, routing, facility location etc.

== Academic career ==
Naveen Garg received his B.Tech. degree in Computer Science and Engineering from Indian Institute of Technology, Delhi, in 1991, and a Ph.D. from the same institute in 1994 under the supervision of Prof. Vijay Vazirani with a dissertation on "Multicommodity Flows and Approximation Algorithms". He was a Postdoctoral Fellow in Max Planck Institute for Informatics, Saarbrücken under the mentorship of Kurt Mehlhorn during September 1994 to August 1996, and a Research Scientist there during September 1996 to December 1997. He joined Indian Institute of Technology, Delhi, as a faculty in January 1998. Currently, he is Janaki and K.A. Iyer Chair Professor in the Computer Science and Engineering Department and also the Dean, AAIP (Alumni Affairs And International Programs) at IIT Delhi. He is also the co-director of the Indo-German Max-Planck Center for Computer Science (IMPECS). Presently, he is the Head of the CSE Department at IIT Delhi.

== Awards and recognitions ==
Naveen Garg has secured the Wilhelm Bessel Research Award instituted by Alexander von Humboldt Foundation in Germany in 2001. The award is given to scientists and scholars from abroad, internationally renowned in their field, who are expected to produce cutting-edge achievements having a seminal influence on their discipline beyond their immediate field of work. He was awarded the Career Award for Young Teachers instituted by All India Council for Technical Education in 2004. The award recognizes young talented teachers who have established competence in their area of specialization. The Indian National Academy of Engineering recognized his talent by presenting him with Young Engineer Award in 2005 and Indian National Science Academy awarded him the Young Scientist Medal in 2006. Also, he has been elected as a fellow of Indian Academy of Sciences, Bangalore and Indian National Academy of Engineering in the year 2014 and 2020 respectively in recognition of his contribution to engineering and technology. In 2017, he became a laureate of the Asian Scientist 100 by the Asian Scientist.
