= Quasi-polynomial time =

Computational complexity class

In computational complexity theory and the analysis of algorithms, an algorithm is said to take quasi-polynomial time if its time complexity is quasi-polynomially bounded. That is, there should exist a constant $c$ such that the worst-case running time of the algorithm, on inputs of size $n$, has an upper bound of the form
$$2^{O\bigl((\log n)^c\bigr)}.$$

The decision problems with quasi-polynomial time algorithms are natural candidates for being NP-intermediate, neither having polynomial time nor likely to be NP-hard.

== Complexity class ==
The complexity class QP consists of all problems that have quasi-polynomial time algorithms. It can be defined in terms of DTIME as follows.

$$\mathsf{QP} = \bigcup_{c \in \mathbb{N}} \mathsf{DTIME} \left(2^{(\log n)^c}\right)$$

== Examples ==
An early example of a quasi-polynomial time algorithm was the Adleman–Pomerance–Rumely primality test. However, the problem of testing whether a number is a prime number has subsequently been shown to have a polynomial time algorithm, the AKS primality test.

In some cases, quasi-polynomial time bounds can be proven to be optimal under the exponential time hypothesis or a related computational hardness assumption. For instance, this is true for the following problems:

- Finding the largest disjoint subset of a collection of unit disks in the hyperbolic plane can be solved in time $n^{O(\log n)}$, and requires time $n^{\Omega(\log n)}$ under the exponential time hypothesis.
- Finding a graph with the fewest vertices that does not appear as an induced subgraph of a given graph can be solved in time $n^{O(\log n)}$, and requires time $n^{\Omega(\log n)}$ under the exponential time hypothesis.
- Finding the smallest dominating set in a tournament. This is a subset of the vertices of the tournament that has at least one directed edge to all other vertices. It can be solved in time $n^{O(\log n)}$, and requires time $n^{\Omega(\log n)}$ under the exponential time hypothesis.
- Computing the Vapnik–Chervonenkis dimension of a family of sets. This is the size of the largest set $S$ (not necessarily in the family) that is shattered by the family, meaning that each subset of $S$ can be formed by intersecting $S$ with a member of the family. It can be solved in time $n^{O(\log n)}$, and requires time $n^{(\log n)^{1/3-o(1)}}$ under the exponential time hypothesis.

Other problems for which the best known algorithm takes quasi-polynomial time include:

- The planted clique problem, of determining whether a random graph has been modified by adding edges between all pairs of a subset of its vertices.
- Monotone dualization, several equivalent problems of converting logical formulas between conjunctive and disjunctive normal form, listing all minimal hitting sets of a family of sets, or listing all minimal set covers of a family of sets, with time complexity measured in the combined input and output size.
- Parity games, involving token-passing along the edges of a colored directed graph. The paper giving a quasi-polynomial algorithm for these games won the 2021 Nerode Prize.
- 3-coloring circle graphs. These are the intersection graphs of chords of a circle. Finding their optimal colorings, in general, is NP-hard, as is testing whether they can be colored with four colors, but colorings with three colors can be found in time $n^{O(\log n)}$.

Problems for which a quasi-polynomial time algorithm has been announced but not fully published include:

- The graph isomorphism problem, determining whether two graphs can be made equal to each other by relabeling their vertices, announced in 2015 and updated in 2017 by László Babai.
- The unknotting problem, recognizing whether a knot diagram describes the unknot, announced by Marc Lackenby in 2021.

== In approximation algorithms ==
Quasi-polynomial time has also been used to study approximation algorithms. In particular, a quasi-polynomial-time approximation scheme (QPTAS) is a variant of a polynomial-time approximation scheme whose running time is quasi-polynomial rather than polynomial. Problems with a QPTAS include minimum-weight triangulation, finding the maximum clique on the intersection graph of disks, and determining the probability that a hypergraph becomes disconnected when some of its edges fail with given independent probabilities.

More strongly, the problem of finding an approximate Nash equilibrium has a QPTAS, but cannot have a PTAS under the exponential time hypothesis.
