= Guy Blelloch =

American computer scientist

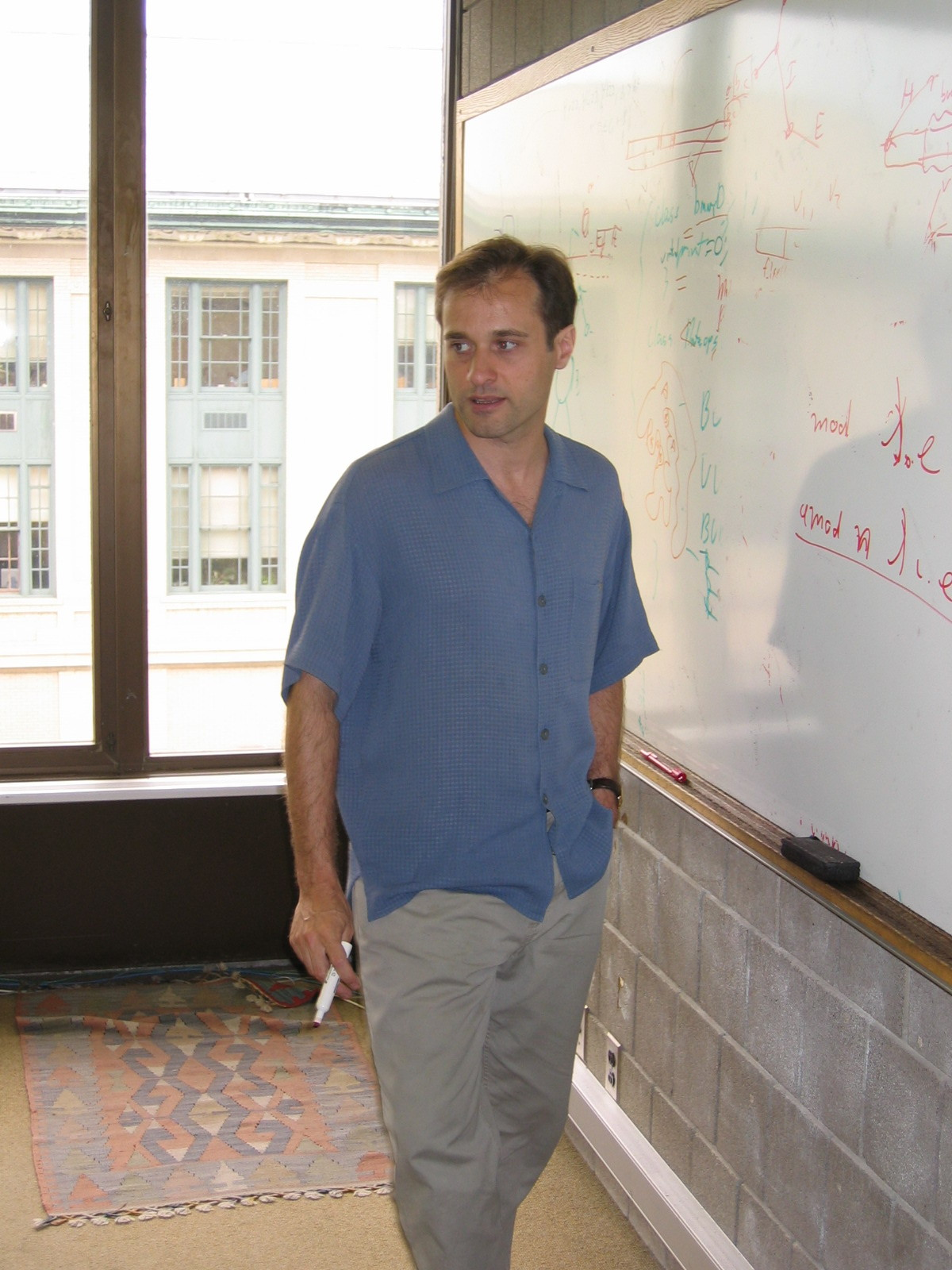
- Blelloch in 2004
- Education: Swarthmore College, Massachusetts Institute of Technology
- Awards: ACM Fellow; IEEE CS Charles Babbage Award
- Scientific career
- Fields: Computer science
- Workplaces: Carnegie Mellon University
- Thesis: Vector Models for Data-Parallel Computing (1988)
- Doctoral advisor: Charles E. Leiserson
- Doctoral students: Virginia Vassilevska Williams

Guy Edward Blelloch is a professor of computer science at Carnegie Mellon University. He is known for his work in parallel algorithms.

== Education and career ==
Blelloch went to Swarthmore College and graduated in 1983 with a BA in Physics and BS in Engineering. He then pursued a PhD in Computer Science at MIT and was advised by Charles E. Leiserson. He graduated in 1988 with a dissertation titled Vector Models for Data-Parallel Computing.

Blelloch joined Carnegie Mellon University in 1988 and has taught courses on parallel algorithms and data structures. From 2016 to 2020, he was also the associate dean of undergraduate studies.

== Awards and recognitions ==
Blelloch was inducted as an ACM Fellow in 2011.

He was the recipient of 2021 IEEE CS Charles Babbage Award in recognition of "contributions to parallel programming, parallel algorithms, and the interface between them".

He was the recipient of the 2023 ACM Paris Kanellakis Theory and Practice Award for "contributions to algorithm engineering, including the Ligra, GBBS, and Aspen frameworks which revolutionized large-scale graph processing on shared-memory machines".
