= UP (complexity) =

In complexity theory, UP (unambiguous non-deterministic polynomial-time) is the complexity class of decision problems solvable in polynomial time on an unambiguous Turing machine (a nondeterministic Turing machine with at most one accepting path for each input). UP contains P and is contained in NP.

A common reformulation of NP states that a language is in NP if and only if a given "certificate" can be verified by a deterministic machine in polynomial time. Similarly, a language is in UP if a given certificate can be verified in polynomial time, and the verifier machine only accepts at most one certificate for each problem instance. More formally, a language L belongs to UP if there exists a two-input polynomial-time algorithm A and a constant c such that

if $x \in L$, then there exists a unique certificate y with $|y| = O(|x|^c)$ such that $A(x,y) = 1$
if $x \not\in L$, there is no certificate y with $|y| = O(|x|^c)$ such that $A(x,y) = 1$
algorithm A verifies L in polynomial time.

UP (and its complement co-UP) contain both the integer factorization problem and parity game problem. Because determined effort has yet to find a polynomial-time solution to any of these problems, it is suspected to be difficult to show P=UP, or even P=(UP ∩ co-UP).

The Valiant–Vazirani theorem states that NP is contained in RP^{Promise-UP}, which means that there is a randomized reduction from any problem in NP to a problem in Promise-UP.

UP is not known to have any complete problems.
