= List of PPAD-complete problems =

This is a list of PPAD-complete problems.

== Fixed-point theorems ==
- Sperner's lemma
- Brouwer fixed-point theorem
- Kakutani fixed-point theorem

== Game theory ==
- Nash equilibrium
- Core of Balanced Games

== Equilibria in game theory and economics ==
- Fisher market equilibria
- Arrow-Debreu equilibria
- Approximate Competitive Equilibrium from Equal Incomes
- Finding clearing payments in financial networks

== Graph theory ==
- Fractional stable paths problems
- Fractional hypergraph matching (see also the NP-complete Hypergraph matching)
- Fractional strong kernel

== Miscellaneous ==
- Scarf's lemma
- Fractional bounded budget connection games
