= Richard E. Ladner =

American computer scientist (born 1943)

- Born: August 22, 1943 (age 83); Berkeley, California
- Education: St. Mary's College of California; University of California, Berkeley
- Known for: Ladner's theorem
- Awards: Guggenheim Fellowship; ACM Fellow; IEEE Fellow; SIGCHI Social Impact Award; SIGACCESS Outstanding Contribution to Computing and Accessibility Award
- Scientific career
- Fields: Theoretical Computer Science; Accessible computing
- Workplaces: University of Washington
- Thesis: Mitotic recursively enumerable sets (1971)
- Doctoral advisor: Robert William Robinson

Richard Emil Ladner (born August 22, 1943) is an American computer scientist known for his contributions to both theoretical computer science and assistive technology. Ladner is a professor emeritus at the University of Washington.

== Biography ==
Richard Ladner was born as one of four children of deaf parents. Both of his parents were teachers at the California School for the Deaf when it was in Berkeley, California, and used American Sign Language and speech for communication. He grew up around deaf people and ASL but did not become fluent until he took some ASL classes in his early thirties. Ladner earned his undergraduate degree from St. Mary's College of California in 1965, and his doctorate in mathematics from the University of California, Berkeley in 1971. Among other work, he obtained important results in computational complexity theory and in automata theory. Since 1971, he has been a professor at the University of Washington.

In 1985, Ladner was awarded a Guggenheim Fellowship. In 1995, Ladner was appointed an ACM Fellow, and in 2009 an IEEE Fellow. He has served as an Area Editor for the Journal of the Association for Computing Machinery, Editor for SIAM Journal on Computing, an Associate Editor for the Journal of Computer and System Sciences, and Theory of Computing Systems. He is currently on the Editorial Boards for ACM Transactions on Accessible Computing and Communications of the ACM.
