= Pachner moves =

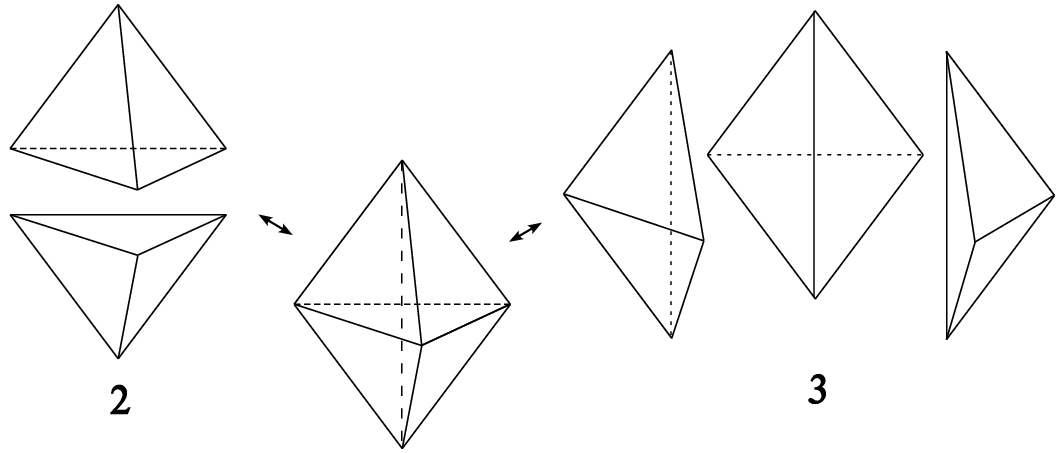
2-3 Pachner move: a union of 2 tetrahedra gets decomposed into 3 tetrahedra.

In topology, a branch of mathematics, Pachner moves, named after Udo Pachner, are ways of replacing a triangulation of a piecewise linear manifold by a different triangulation of a homeomorphic manifold. Pachner moves are also called bistellar flips. Any two triangulations of a piecewise linear manifold are related by a finite sequence of Pachner moves.

== Definition ==
Let $\Delta_{n+1}$ be the $(n+1)$-simplex. $\partial \Delta_{n+1}$ is a combinatorial n-sphere with its triangulation as the boundary of the n+1-simplex.

Given a triangulated piecewise linear (PL) n-manifold $N$, and a co-dimension 0 subcomplex $C \subset N$ together with a simplicial isomorphism $\phi : C \to C' \subset \partial \Delta_{n+1}$, the Pachner move on N associated to C is the triangulated manifold $(N \setminus C) \cup_\phi (\partial \Delta_{n+1} \setminus C')$. By design, this manifold is PL-isomorphic to $N$ but the isomorphism does not preserve the triangulation.

== See also ==
- Flip graph
- Unknotting problem
- Reidemeister move
- Triangulation (topology)
