= Samir Khuller =

Indian computer scientist (born 1965)

- Born: 1965 (age 60–61)
- Education: IIT Kanpur (B.Tech.); Cornell University (M.S., Ph.D.)
- Known for: Connected dominating set
- Awards: NSF Career Award (1995); ESA Test-of-Time Award (2015); EATCS Fellow (2021); ACM Fellow (2022)
- Scientific career
- Fields: Computer Science
- Workplaces: University of Maryland; Northwestern University
- Thesis: Efficient Parallel Algorithms for Disjoint Paths and Connectivity (1990)
- Doctoral advisor: Vijay Vazirani
- Other academic advisors: Joseph S. B. Mitchell, Esther Arkin
- Doctoral students: Barna Saha

Samir Khuller (born 1965) is a professor of Computer Science and the Peter and Adrienne Barris Chair of Computer Science at Northwestern University. He was previously Professor and Elizabeth Stevinson Iribe Chair of Computer Science in the University of Maryland's Department of Computer Science. His research is in the area of algorithm design, specifically on combinatorial optimization, graphs and networks and scheduling. He was named a Distinguished Scholar Teacher and received a Google Research Award in 2007.

== Education and work ==
Khuller obtained his undergraduate degree from the Indian Institute of Technology Kanpur and was awarded a PhD in 1990 from Cornell University as a student of Vijay Vazirani. From 1990 to 1992, he was a research associate at UMIACS (the Institute for Advanced Computer Studies), a division of the University of Maryland. In 1992 he joined the faculty of the University of Maryland Department of Computer Science. He became the Elizabeth Stevinson Iribe Chair of Computer Science at the Department of Computer Science in 2012, a position he held until 2017.

Khuller joined Northwestern University's McCormick School of Engineering in March 2019 as the first Peter and Adrienne Barris Chair of Computer Science at the Department of Computer Science.

He was named an EATCS Fellow in 2021, and elected to the Board of Directors of the Computing Research Association in 2023. He was named to the 2022 class of ACM Fellows, "for contributions to algorithm design with real-world implications and for mentoring and community-building".

=== Selected scientific works ===
Khuller and Guha designed an approximation algorithms for the minimum connected dominating set problem that achieves a factor of 2 ln Δ + O(1), where Δ is the maximum degree of a vertex in G.
