= Unambiguous Turing machine =

Model of computation in computer science

In theoretical computer science, an unambiguous Turing machine is a theoretical model of computation whose power (under resource restrictions) is between that of ordinary Turing machines and nondeterministic Turing machines. An unambiguous Turing machine is defined as a nondeterministic Turing machine with the property that for every input, there is at most one accepting computation path.

== Formal definition ==
A nondeterministic Turing machine is represented formally by a 6-tuple, $M=(Q, \Sigma, \iota, \sqcup, A, \delta)$, as explained in the aforementioned linked article.

An unambiguous Turing machine is a nondeterministic Turing machine $M$ such that for any input $w$, $M$ has at most one accepting computation on $w$. That is, for every input $w$, there exists at most one sequence of configurations $c_0,c_1,\ldots,c_m$ with the following conditions:

1. $c_0$ is the initial configuration with input $w$
1. $c_{i+1}$ is a successor of $c_i$ and
1. $c_m$ is an accepting configuration.

== Expressivity ==
The language of an unambiguous Turing machine is defined to be the same language that is accepted by the nondeterministic Turing machine. A language of strings L can be defined to be unambiguously recognizable if it is recognizable by an unambiguous Turing machine.

The class of unambiguously recognizable languages is exactly the same as the class of recursively enumerable languages (RE). Indeed, every deterministic Turing machine is an unambiguous Turing machine, as for each input, there is exactly one computation possible. Therefore, all recursively enumerable languages are unambiguously recognizable. Conversely, every unambiguously recognizable language is recognizable by a nondeterministic Turing machine, and hence is recursively enumerable.

The complexity class UP is defined as the class of languages that can be decided in polynomial time by an unambiguous Turing machine.
