= Elena Ferrari =

Italian computer scientist

Elena Ferrari is a Professor of Computer Science and Director of the STRICT Social Lab at the Università degli Studi dell’Insubria, Varese, Italy. Ferrari was named Fellow of the Institute of Electrical and Electronics Engineers (IEEE) in 2013 for contributions to security and privacy for data and applications. She has been named one of the “50 Most Influential Italian Women in Tech” in 2018. She was elected as an ACM Fellow in 2019 "for contributions to security and privacy of data and social network systems".

== Education ==
Ferrari received her MS degree in Computer Science from the University of Milano (Italy) in 1992, and PhD in Computer Science in 1998.

== Career ==
Ferrari is a full professor of Computer Science at the Università degli Studi dell’Insubria, Varese, Italy. She was an assistant professor at the Department of Computer Science of the University of Milano (Italy) from 1998 until January 2001.

She has served on the editorial board of ACM/IMS Transactions on Data Science (TDS), IEEE Internet Computing, and the Transactions on Data Privacy. She is an associate editor of Springer Journal in Data Science And Engineering.

== Research ==
Ferrari's main research interests are in cybersecurity, privacy, and trust, and she publishes mainly in the areas of security and privacy for big data and Internet of Things (IoT); access control; machine learning for cybersecurity; risk analysis; blockchain; and secure social media.

Fundamentally, Ferrari's research investigated means for users to protect their privacy online, and solutions for users to practice better ownership of their data. Examples of her work include temporal role-based access control, enforcing access control in web-based social networks, web content filtering and rule-based access control for social networks.

== Awards ==
She has received several awards for her work:

- ACM Conference on Data and Application Security and Privacy (CODASPY) Research Award (2019)
- ACM SACMAT 10-Year Test-of-Time Award (2019) for her work "A semantic web based framework for social network access control" (2009)
- IEEE Computer Society Technical Achievement Award (2009) “for pioneering contributions to Secure Data Management.”
- IEEE Fellow (2012)
- ACM Fellow (2019)
