= Fine-grained reduction =

In computational complexity theory, a fine-grained reduction is a transformation from one computational problem to another, used to relate the difficulty of improving the time bounds for the two problems. Intuitively, it provides a method for solving one problem efficiently by using the solution to the other problem as a subroutine. If problem $A$ can be solved in time $a(n)$ and problem $B$ can be solved in time $b(n)$, then the existence of an $(a,b)$-reduction from problem $A$ to problem $B$ implies that any significant speedup for problem $B$ would also lead to a speedup for problem $A$.

== Definition ==
Let $A$ and $B$ be computational problems, specified as the desired output for each possible input. Let $a$ and $b$ both be time-constructible functions that take an integer argument $n$ and produce an integer result. Usually, $a$ and $b$ are the time bounds for known or naive algorithms for the two problems, and often they are monomials such as $n^2$.

Then $A$ is said to be $(a,b)$-reducible to $B$ if, for every real number $\epsilon>0$, there exists a real number $\delta>0$ and an algorithm that solves instances of problem $A$ by transforming it into a sequence of instances of problem $B$, taking time $O\bigl(a(n)^{1-\delta}\bigr)$ for the transformation on instances of size $n$, and producing a sequence of instances whose sizes $n_i$ are bounded by $\sum_i b(n_i)^{1-\epsilon}<a(n)^{1-\delta}$.

An $(a,b)$-reduction is given by the mapping from $\epsilon$ to the pair of an algorithm and $\delta$.

== Speedup implication ==
Suppose $A$ is $(a,b)$-reducible to $B$, and there exists $\epsilon>0$ such that $B$ can be solved in time $O\bigl(b(n)^{1-\epsilon}\bigr)$. Then, with these assumptions, there also exists $\delta>0$ such that $A$ can be solved in time $O\bigl(a(n)^{1-\delta}\bigr)$. Namely, let $\delta$ be the value given by the $(a,b)$-reduction, and solve $A$ by applying the transformation of the reduction and using the fast algorithm for $B$ for each resulting subproblem.

Equivalently, if $A$ cannot be solved in time significantly faster than $a(n)$, then $B$ cannot be solved in time significantly faster than $b(n)$.

== History ==
Fine-grained reductions were defined, in the special case that $a$ and $b$ are equal monomials, by Virginia Vassilevska Williams and Ryan Williams in 2010. They also showed the existence of $(n^3,n^3)$-reductions between several problems including all-pairs shortest paths, finding the second-shortest path between two given vertices in a weighted graph, finding negative-weight triangles in weighted graphs, and testing whether a given distance matrix describes a metric space. According to their results, either all of these problems have time bounds with exponents less than three, or none of them do.

The term "fine-grained reduction" comes from later work by Virginia Vassilevska Williams in an invited presentation at the 10th International Symposium on Parameterized and Exact Computation.

Although the original definition of fine-grained reductions involved deterministic algorithms, the corresponding concepts for randomized algorithms and nondeterministic algorithms have also been considered.
