= Virginia Vassilevska Williams =

Theoretical computer scientist

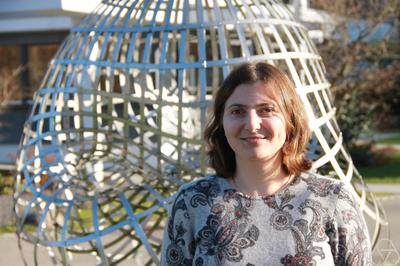
- Vassilevska Williams at Oberwolfach, 2012
- Education: Carnegie Mellon University (PhD, 2008); Caltech (BS, 2003)
- Known for: Matrix multiplication; Graph algorithms; Dynamic algorithms; Fine-grained complexity theory
- Scientific career
- Fields: Complexity theory; Algorithms
- Workplaces: MIT; Stanford; UC Berkeley; Institute for Advanced Study
- Doctoral advisor: Guy Blelloch

Virginia Vassilevska Williams (née Virginia Panayotova Vassilevska) is a theoretical computer scientist and mathematician known for her research in computational complexity theory and algorithms. She is currently the Cecil H. Green Professor of Electrical Engineering and Computer Science at the Massachusetts Institute of Technology. She is notable for her breakthrough results in fast matrix multiplication, for her work on dynamic algorithms, and for helping to develop the field of fine-grained complexity.

== Education and career ==
Williams is originally from Bulgaria, and attended a German-language high school in Sofia. She graduated from the California Institute of Technology in 2003, and completed her Ph.D. at Carnegie Mellon University in 2008. Her dissertation, Efficient Algorithms for Path Problems in Weighted Graphs, was supervised by Guy Blelloch.

After postdoctoral research at the Institute for Advanced Study and University of California, Berkeley, Williams became an assistant professor of computer science at Stanford University in 2013. She moved to MIT as an associate professor in 2017.

== Research ==
In 2011, Williams found an algorithm for multiplying two $n\times n$ matrices in time $O(n^{2.373})$. This improved a previous time bound for matrix multiplication algorithms, the Coppersmith–Winograd algorithm, that had stood as the best known for 24 years. Her initial improvement was independent of Andrew Stothers, who also improved the same bound a year earlier; after learning of Stothers' work, she combined ideas from both methods to improve his bound as well. With collaborators, in 2023 she extended this bound to $O(n^{2.371552})$, and later in 2024 to $O(n^{2.371339})$.

== Recognition ==
Williams was an NSF Computing Innovation Fellow for 2009–2011, and won a Sloan Research Fellowship in 2017. She was an invited speaker at the 2018 International Congress of Mathematicians, speaking in the section on Mathematical Aspects of Computer Science.

== Personal life ==
Williams is the daughter of applied mathematicians Panayot Vassilevski and Tanya Kostova-Vassilevska. She is married to Ryan Williams, also a computer science professor at MIT; they have worked together in the field of fine-grained complexity.
