= Ryan Williams (computer scientist) =

American computer scientist (born 1969)

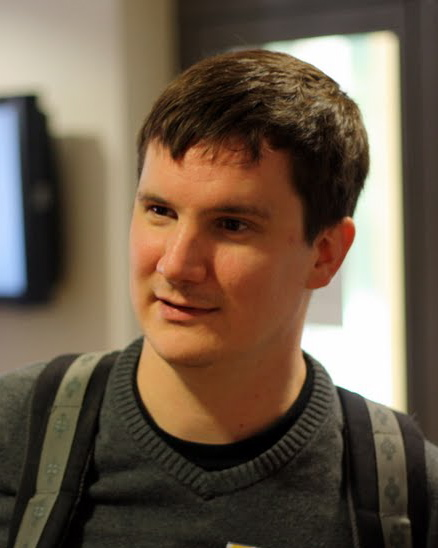
- Williams in November 2010
- Born: 1979 (age 46–47)
- Education: Cornell University; Carnegie Mellon University
- Scientific career
- Fields: Computational complexity theory, Algorithms
- Workplaces: Carnegie Mellon University; IBM Almaden Research Center; Stanford University
- Doctoral advisor: Manuel Blum

Richard Ryan Williams, known as Ryan Williams (born 1979), is an American theoretical computer scientist working in computational complexity theory and algorithms.

== Education ==
Williams graduated from the Alabama School of Mathematics and Science before receiving his bachelor's degree in math and computer science from Cornell University in 2001 and his Ph.D. in computer science in 2007 from Carnegie Mellon University under the supervision of Manuel Blum. He was a member of the Institute for Advanced Study in Princeton for the 2008-09 academic year. From 2009 to 2011, he was a postdoctoral fellow in the Theory Group of IBM Almaden Research Center. From Fall 2011 to Fall 2016, he was a professor at Stanford University. In January 2017, he joined the faculty at MIT. As of 2020, Williams is a full professor in the department of Electrical Engineering and Computer Science.

== Research ==
Williams has been a member of the program committee for the Symposium on Theory of Computing in 2011 and various other conferences. He won the Ron V. Book best student paper award at the IEEE Conference on Computational Complexity in 2005 and 2007, and the best student paper award at the International Colloquium on Automata, Languages and Programming in 2004 from the European Association for Theoretical Computer Science.

Williams’s result that the complexity class NEXP is not contained in ACC^{0} received the best paper award at the Conference on Computational Complexity in 2011. Complexity theorist Scott Aaronson has called the result "one of the most spectacular of the decade". In 2024, for this work Williams was awarded the Gödel Prize.

Williams has also worked on the computational complexity of k-anonymity.

In 2025, Williams, leveraging previous work of J. Cook and I. Mertz on catalytic computing, proved that every deterministic multitape Turing machine of time complexity $t$ can be simulated in space $O(\sqrt{t \log t})$, improving the previous bound of $O(t/ \log t)$ by Hopcroft, Paul, and Valiant, and strengthening the case in the negative for the question if PSPACE=P.

== Personal life ==
Ryan Williams is married to Virginia Vassilevska Williams, also a theoretical computer scientist.

== Selected publications ==
- Meyerson, Adam; Williams, Ryan (2004), "On the complexity of optimal k-anonymity", Proceedings of the Twenty-Third ACM SIGMOD-SIGACT-SIGART Symposium on Principles of Database Systems (PODS '04), New York, NY, USA: ACM, pp. 223–228, doi:10.1145/1055558.1055591, ISBN 978-1581138580, S2CID 6798963
- Williams, R. (2005), "Better Time-Space Lower Bounds for SAT and Related Problems", IEEE Conference on Computational Complexity (CCC), pp. 40–49
- Williams, R. (2005), "A New Algorithm for Optimal 2-Constraint Satisfaction and Its Implications", Theoretical Computer Science, 348 (2–3): 357–365, doi:10.1016/j.tcs.2005.09.023
- Williams, R. (2008), "Time-Space Tradeoffs for Counting NP Solutions Modulo Integers", Computational Complexity, 17 (2): 179–219, doi:10.1007/s00037-008-0248-y, S2CID 8815358
- Williams, Ryan (2014-01-01). "Nonuniform ACC Circuit Lower Bounds". Journal of the ACM (JACM). 61 (1). New York, NY, USA: Association for Computing Machinery: 2:1–2:32. doi:10.1145/2559903. ISSN 0004-5411.
