= Promise problem =

Type of computational problem

In computational complexity theory, a promise problem is a generalization of a decision problem where the input is promised to belong to a particular subset of all possible inputs. Unlike decision problems, the yes instances (the inputs for which an algorithm must return yes) and no instances do not exhaust the set of all inputs. Intuitively, the algorithm has been promised that the input does indeed belong to the set of yes instances or no instances. There may be inputs which are neither yes nor no. If such an input is given to an algorithm for solving a promise problem, the algorithm is allowed to output anything, and may even not halt.

== Definition ==
A decision problem can be associated with a language $L \subseteq \{0,1\}^*$, where the problem is to accept all inputs in $L$ and reject all inputs not in $L$. For a promise problem, there are two languages, $L_{\text{YES}}$ and $L_{\text{NO}}$, which must be disjoint, which means $L_{\text{YES}} \cap L_{\text{NO}} = \varnothing$, such that all the inputs in $L_{\text{YES}}$ are to be accepted and all inputs in $L_{\text{NO}}$ are to be rejected. The set $L_{\text{YES}} \cup L_{\text{NO}}$ is called the promise. There are no requirements on the output if the input does not belong to the promise. If the promise equals $\{0,1\}^*$, then this is also a decision problem, and the promise is said to be trivial.

== Examples ==
Many natural problems are actually promise problems. Here are some examples.

1. Given a directed acyclic graph, determine if the graph has a path of length 10. The yes instances are directed acyclic graphs with a path of length 10, whereas the no instances are directed acyclic graphs with no path of length 10. The promise is the set of directed acyclic graphs. In this example, the promise is easy to check. In particular, it is very easy to check if a given graph is cyclic.

2. The promised property could be difficult to evaluate. For instance, consider the problem "Given a Hamiltonian graph, determine if the graph has a cycle of size 4." Now the promise is NP-hard to evaluate, yet the promise problem is easy to solve since checking for cycles of size 4 can be done in polynomial time.

3. Even, Selman and Yacobi presented the following promise problem, later called xSAT: we are given two CNF formulas, with the promise that exactly one of them is satisfiable. The goal is to decide which of the two formulas is satisfiable. They proved that there is a Cook reduction from SAT to xSAT. They also proved that xSAT is both in NP and in coNP.

== History ==
Promise problems have been defined by Even, Selman and Yacobi in 1984. Goldreich has published a survey on promise problems in 2006. See also.

== See also ==
- Computational problem
- Decision problem
- Optimization problem
- Search problem
- Counting problem (complexity)
- Function problem
- TFNP
