= Exponential time hypothesis =

Unproven computational hardness assumption

In computational complexity theory, the exponential time hypothesis (ETH) states that satisfiability of 3-CNF Boolean formulas (3-SAT) cannot be solved in subexponential time, $2^{o(n)}$. More precisely, the usual form of the hypothesis asserts the existence of a number $s_3 > 0$ such that all algorithms that correctly solve 3-SAT require time at least $2^{s_3 n}.$ ETH is a computational hardness assumption proposed by Russell Impagliazzo and Ramamohan Paturi in 1999 and elaborated on, with Francis Zane, in 2001.

It is known that 3-SAT is NP-complete, therefore, ETH implies P ≠ NP; however, the negation of ETH does not imply P = NP. The hypothesis has been widely used in areas such as parameterized complexity, where it implies optimal or near-optimal time complexity of many known algorithms (including those with lower than exponential time).

In October 2026, American artificial intelligence companies OpenAI and Anthropic announced separate claimed disproofs of ETH found by internal LLMs, exhibiting explicit algorithms claimed to run in subexponential time. A team of experts, including those who formulated ETH, announced a collaboration to examine this work.

== Definition ==
The $k$-SAT problem is a version of the Boolean satisfiability problem in which the input to the problem is a Boolean expression in conjunctive normal form (that is, an and of ors of variables and their negations) with at most $k$ variables per clause. The goal is to determine whether this expression can be made to be true by some assignment of Boolean values to its variables. While 2-SAT has a linear time algorithm, 3-SAT is known to be NP-complete; until 2026, all suggested algorithms for larger $k$ take exponential time, with the base of the exponential function depending on $k$. For instance, the WalkSAT probabilistic algorithm can solve $k$-SAT in average time
$$\left(2-\frac2k\right)^n n^{O(1)},$$
where $n$ is the number of variables in the given $k$-SAT instance. For each integer $k\ge 3$, define $s_k$ to be the smallest number such that $k$-SAT can be solved in time $2^{s_k n+o(n)}$. This minimum might not exist, if a sequence of better and better algorithms have correspondingly smaller exponential growth in their time bounds; in that case, define $s_k$ to be the infimum of the real numbers $\delta$ for which $k$-SAT can be solved in time $O(2^{\delta n})$. Because problems with larger $k$ cannot be easier, these numbers are ordered as $s_3\le s_4\le \cdots$, and because of WalkSAT they are at most
$$s_k\le \log_2 \left(2-\frac2k\right)<1.$$
The exponential time hypothesis is the conjecture that they are all nonzero, or equivalently, that the smallest of them, $s_3$, is nonzero.

Some sources define the exponential time hypothesis to be the slightly weaker statement that 3-SAT cannot be solved in time $2^{o(n)}$. If there existed an algorithm to solve 3-SAT in time $2^{o(n)}$, then $s_3$ would equal zero. However, it is consistent with current knowledge that there could be a sequence of 3-SAT algorithms, each with running time $O(2^{\delta_i n})$ for a sequence of numbers $\delta_i$ tending towards zero, but where the descriptions of these algorithms are so quickly growing that a single algorithm could not automatically select and run the most appropriate one. If this were to be the case, then $s_3$ would equal zero even though there would be no single algorithm running in time $2^{o(n)}$. A related variant of the exponential time hypothesis is the non-uniform exponential time hypothesis, which posits that there is no family of algorithms (one for each length of the input, in the spirit of advice) that can solve 3-SAT in time $2^{o(n)}$.

Because the numbers $s_3,s_4,\dots$ form a monotonic sequence that is bounded above by one, they must converge to a limit
$$s_\infty=\lim_{k\to\infty} s_k.$$
The strong exponential time hypothesis (SETH) is the conjecture that $s_\infty=1$.

=== Formulation ===
In a 2012 lecture, Impagliazzo explained that ETH and SETH are a "principled educated guess" that inform the complexities of various NP-complete problems. "Mohan and I carefully call these hypotheses rather than conjectures, because we really think that it's about a fair coin flip whether they're true or not. But the point is that if it's true, it answers a lot of these questions, and if it's false, it answers a lot of these questions."

== Progress ==
On October 26, 2026, OpenAI published a manuscript containing a claimed disproof of ETH, produced by an internal LLM. The company asked academics to check the work before anyone treated it as settled. As of November 2026, the claim has not gone through academic review. OpenAI stated that future review of the proof would be done in collaboration with complexity researchers Russell Impagliazzo, Ramamohan Paturi, and Ryan Williams, who subsequently published a message to the theoretical computer science community asking for input. Paturi publicly shared the prompt that OpenAI had used; it asked the model to refute SETH.

In a statement to The Washington Times, Paturi said, "If it holds up, it would be a major advance in our understanding of the limits of computation." Williams told TechCrunch, "Some parts [of OpenAI’s proof] are, maybe you could say routine, but then yes, there are two or three alien-looking parts, and it’s exactly these parts that I saw that made me think, wow, this is something that the whole community needs to work on together." Computer scientist Fedor Fomin told science magazine New Scientist that "This came as a complete surprise, a shock ... Nobody I know expected it," while computer scientist Leslie Goldberg said, "Assuming that it is confirmed, this is an enormous breakthrough." Mathematician Timothy Gowers called it "very surprising and consequential that it is false."

Also on October 26, Anthropic announced that an internal Claude model on October 16 had independently disproved ETH and published the details on GitHub.

Both papers were accompanied by formalizations in Lean and both papers claim a worst-case runtime of $2^{O(n (\log\log n) /\sqrt{\log n})}$ for deciding 3-SAT instances with n variables, although OpenAI's formalization only proves a runtime of $2^{O(n (\log\log n)^2 /\sqrt{\log n})}$. Because both $(\log\log n) /\sqrt{\log n}$ and $(\log\log n)^2 /\sqrt{\log n}$ go to zero as $n \rightarrow \infty$, the claimed complexity statements imply that 3-SAT can be solved in time faster than $O(c^n)$ for all $c>1$, thus the proofs of Claude and ChatGPT refute ETH.

=== Methods ===
According to computer scientist Ryan O'Donnell, the refutation can be posed as follows. One considers the harder counting problem #3-SAT; any lower bound on the time complexity of #3-SAT immediately applies to the decision problem 3-SAT. But #3-SAT is equivalent to computing the permanent of a certain 0-1 matrix. One can approach this computation via polynomial interpolation over a larger family of matrices, including sums of block matrices with large block size and matrices of low rank, whose permanents are easier to compute. Completing the interpolation involves techniques from Fourier analysis.

== Implications ==
=== Satisfiability ===
It is not possible for $s_k>0$ to equal $s_\infty$ for any finite $k$: as Impagliazzo, Paturi & Zane (2001) showed, there exists a constant $\alpha$ such that $s_k\le s_\infty(1-\alpha/k)$. Therefore, if the exponential time hypothesis is true, there must be infinitely many values of $k$ for which $s_k$ differs from $s_{k+1}$.

An important tool in this area is the sparsification lemma of Impagliazzo, Paturi & Zane (2001), which shows that, for every $\varepsilon>0$, any $k$-CNF formula can be replaced by $O(2^{\varepsilon n})$ simpler $k$-CNF formulas in which each variable appears only a constant number of times, and therefore in which the number of clauses is linear. The sparsification lemma is proven by repeatedly finding large sets of clauses that have a nonempty common intersection in a given formula, and replacing the formula by two simpler formulas, one of which has each of these clauses replaced by their common intersection and the other of which has the intersection removed from each clause. By applying the sparsification lemma and then using new variables to split the clauses, one may then obtain a set of $O(2^{\varepsilon n})$ 3-CNF formulas, each with a linear number of variables, such that the original $k$-CNF formula is satisfiable if and only if at least one of these 3-CNF formulas is satisfiable. Therefore, if 3-SAT could be solved in subexponential time, one could use this reduction to solve $k$-SAT in subexponential time as well. Equivalently, if $s_k>0$ for any $k>0$, then $s_3>0$ as well, and the exponential time hypothesis would be true.

The limiting value $s_\infty$ of the sequence of numbers $s_k$ is at most equal to $s_{\operatorname{CNF}}$, where $s_{\operatorname{CNF}}$ is the infimum of the numbers $\delta$ such that satisfiability of conjunctive normal form formulas without clause length limits can be solved in time $O(2^{\delta n})$. Therefore, if the strong exponential time hypothesis is true, then there would be no algorithm for general CNF satisfiability that is significantly faster than a brute-force search over all possible truth assignments. However, if the strong exponential time hypothesis fails, it would still be possible for $s_{\operatorname{CNF}}$ to equal one.

=== Other search problems ===
The exponential time hypothesis implies that many other problems in the complexity class SNP do not have algorithms whose running time is faster than $c^n$ for some constant $c$. These problems include graph k-colorability, finding Hamiltonian cycles, maximum cliques, maximum independent sets, and vertex cover on $n$-vertex graphs. Conversely, if any of these problems has a subexponential algorithm, then the exponential time hypothesis could be shown to be false.

If cliques or independent sets of logarithmic size could be found in polynomial time, the exponential time hypothesis would be false. Therefore, even though finding cliques or independent sets of such small size is unlikely to be NP-complete, the exponential time hypothesis implies that these problems are non-polynomial. More generally, the exponential time hypothesis implies that it is not possible to find cliques or independent sets of size $k$ in time $n^{o(k)}$. The exponential time hypothesis also implies that it is not possible to solve the k-SUM problem (given $n$ real numbers, find $k$ of them that add to zero) in time $n^{o(k)}$. The strong exponential time hypothesis implies that it is not possible to find $k$-vertex dominating sets more quickly than in time $n^{k-o(1)}$.

The exponential time hypothesis implies also that the weighted feedback arc set problem on tournaments does not have a parametrized algorithm with running time $O(2^{o(\sqrt{\operatorname{OPT}})}n^{O(1)})$. It does however have a parameterized algorithm with running time $O(2^{O(\sqrt{\operatorname{OPT}})}n^{O(1)})$.

The strong exponential time hypothesis leads to tight bounds on the parameterized complexity of several graph problems on graphs of bounded treewidth. In particular, if the strong exponential time hypothesis is true, then the optimal time bound for finding independent sets on graphs of treewidth $w$ is $\bigl(2-o(1)\bigr)^w n^{O(1)}$, the optimal time for the dominating set problem is $\bigl(3-o(1)\bigr)^w n^{O(1)}$, the optimum time for maximum cut is $\bigl(2-o(1)\bigr)^w n^{O(1)}$, and the optimum time for $k$-coloring is $\bigl(k-o(1)\bigr)^w n^{O(1)}$. Equivalently, any improvement on these running times would falsify the strong exponential time hypothesis. The exponential time hypothesis also implies that any fixed-parameter tractable algorithm for edge clique cover must have double exponential dependence on the parameter.

=== Communication complexity ===
In the three-party set disjointness problem in communication complexity, three subsets of the integers in some range $[1,m]$ are specified, and three communicating parties each know two of the three subsets. The goal is for the parties to transmit as few bits to each other on a shared communications channel in order for one of the parties to be able to determine whether the intersection of the three sets is empty or nonempty. A trivial $m$-bit communications protocol would be for one of the three parties to transmit a bitvector describing the intersection of the two sets known to that party, after which either of the two remaining parties can determine the emptiness of the intersection. However, if there exists a protocol that solves the problem with $o(m)$ communication and $2^{o(m)}$ computation, it could be transformed into an algorithm for solving $k$-SAT in time $O(1.74^n)$ for any fixed constant $k$, violating the strong exponential time hypothesis. Therefore, the strong exponential time hypothesis implies either that the trivial protocol for three-party set disjointness is optimal, or that any better protocol requires an exponential amount of computation.

=== Structural complexity ===
If the exponential time hypothesis is true, then 3-SAT would not have a polynomial time algorithm, and therefore it would follow that P ≠ NP. More strongly, in this case, 3-SAT could not even have a quasi-polynomial time algorithm, so NP could not be a subset of QP. However, if the exponential time hypothesis fails, it would have no implication for the P versus NP problem. A padding argument proves the existence of NP-complete problems for which the best known running times have the form $O(2^{n^c})$ for $c<1$, and if the best possible running time for 3-SAT were of this form, then P would be unequal to NP (because 3-SAT is NP-complete and this time bound is not polynomial) but the exponential time hypothesis would be false.

In parameterized complexity theory, because the exponential time hypothesis implies that there does not exist a fixed-parameter-tractable algorithm for maximum clique, it also implies that W[1] ≠ FPT. It is an important open problem in this area whether this implication can be reversed: does W[1] ≠ FPT imply the exponential time hypothesis? There is a hierarchy of parameterized complexity classes called the M-hierarchy that interleaves the W-hierarchy in the sense that, for all $i$, $\mathsf{M}[i]\subseteq\mathsf{W}[i]\subseteq\mathsf{M}[i+1]$; for instance, the problem of finding a vertex cover of size $k\log n$ in an $n$-vertex graph with parameter $k$ is complete for M[1]. The exponential time hypothesis is equivalent to the statement that M[1] ≠ FPT, and the question of whether $\mathsf{M}[i]\subseteq\mathsf{W}[i]$ for $i>1$ is also open.

It is also possible to prove implications in the other direction, from the failure of a variation of the strong exponential time hypothesis to separations of complexity classes. As Williams (2010) shows, if there exists an algorithm $A$ that solves Boolean circuit satisfiability in time $2^n/f(n)$ for some superpolynomially growing function $f$, then NEXPTIME is not a subset of P/poly. Williams shows that, if algorithm $A$ exists, and a family of circuits simulating NEXPTIME in P/poly also existed, then algorithm $A$ could be composed with the circuits to simulate NEXPTIME problems nondeterministically in a smaller amount of time, violating the time hierarchy theorem. Therefore, the existence of algorithm $A$ proves the nonexistence of the family of circuits and the separation of these two complexity classes.

== See also ==
- Savitch's theorem, showing that a similar exponential gap cannot hold for space complexity
