= European Association for Theoretical Computer Science =

Organization

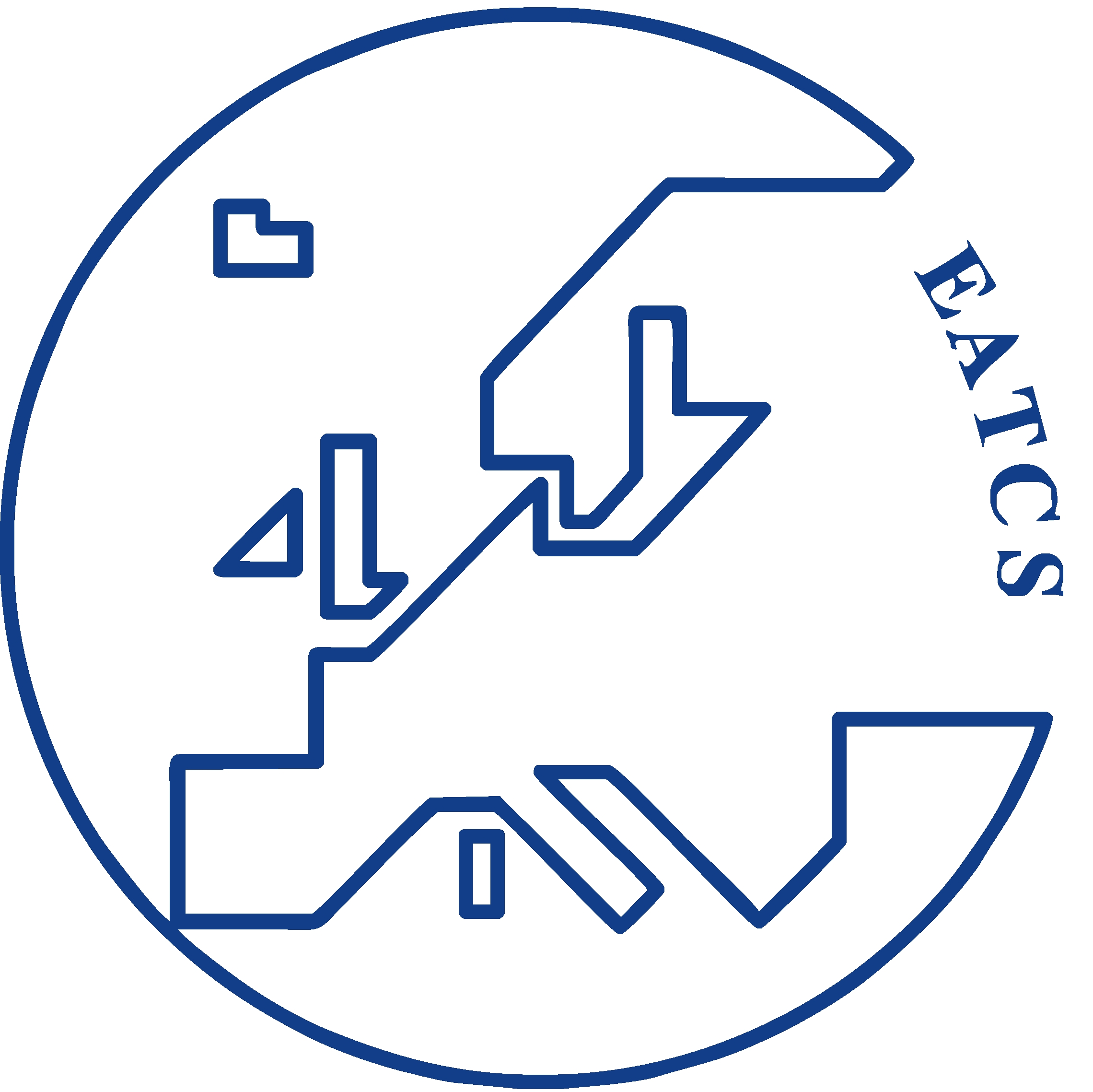
EATCS logo

The European Association for Theoretical Computer Science (EATCS) is an international organization with a European focus, founded in 1972. Its aim is to facilitate the exchange of ideas and results among theoretical computer scientists as well as to stimulate cooperation between the theoretical and the practical community in computer science.

The major activities of the EATCS are:

- Organization of ICALP, the International Colloquium on Automata, Languages and Programming;
- Publication of the Bulletin of the EATCS;
- Publication of a series of monographs and texts on theoretical computer science;
- Publication of the journal Theoretical Computer Science;
- Publication of the journal Fundamenta Informaticae.

== EATCS Award ==
Each year, the EATCS Award is awarded in recognition of a distinguished career in theoretical computer science. The first award was assigned to Richard Karp in 2000; the complete list of the winners is given below:

Year	Awarded	Place
2025	Rajeev Alur	ICALP (Aarhus)
2024	Samson Abramsky	ICALP (Tallinn)
2023	Amos Fiat	ICALP (Paderborn)
2022	Patrick Cousot	ICALP (Paris)
2021	Toniann Pitassi	ICALP (Glasgow)
2020	Mihalis Yannakakis	ICALP (Saarbrücken)
2019	Thomas Henzinger	ICALP (Patras)
2018	Noam Nisan	ICALP (Prague)
2017	Éva Tardos	ICALP (Warsaw)
2016	Dexter Kozen	ICALP (Rome)
2015	Christos Papadimitriou	ICALP (Kyoto)
2014	Gordon Plotkin	ICALP (Copenhagen)
2013	Martin Dyer	ICALP (Riga)
2012	Moshe Vardi	ICALP (Warwick)
2011	Boris Trakhtenbrot	ICALP (Zürich)
2010	Kurt Mehlhorn	ICALP (Bordeaux)
2009	Gérard Huet	ICALP (Rhodes)
2008	Leslie G. Valiant	ICALP (Reykjavík)
2007	Dana S. Scott	ICALP (Wrocław)
2006	Mike Paterson	ICALP (Venice)
2005	Robin Milner	ICALP (Lisbon)
2004	Arto Salomaa	ICALP (Turku)
2003	Grzegorz Rozenberg	ICALP (Eindhoven)
2002	Maurice Nivat	ICALP (Málaga)
2001	Corrado Böhm	ICALP (Crete)
2000	Richard Karp	ICALP (Geneva)

== Presburger Award ==
Starting in 2010, the European Association of Theoretical Computer Science (EATCS) confers each year at the conference ICALP the Presburger Award to a young scientist (in exceptional cases to several young scientists) for outstanding contributions in theoretical computer science, documented by a published paper or a series of published papers. The award is named after Mojzesz Presburger who accomplished his path-breaking work on decidability of the theory of addition (which today is called Presburger arithmetic) as a student in 1929. The complete list of the winners is given below:

Year	Awarded	Place
2021	Shayan Oveis Gharan	ICALP (Glasgow)
2020	Dmitriy Zhuk	ICALP (Saarbrücken/online)
2019	Karl Bringmann, Kasper Green Larsen	ICALP (Patras)
2018	Aleksander Mądry	ICALP (Prague)
2017	Alexandra Silva	ICALP (Warsaw)
2016	Mark Braverman	ICALP (Rome)
2015	Xi Chen	ICALP (Kyoto)
2014	David Woodruff	ICALP (Copenhagen)
2013	Erik Demaine	ICALP (Riga)
2012	Venkatesan Guruswami, Mihai Patrascu	ICALP (Warwick)
2011	Patricia Bouyer-Decitre	ICALP (Zürich)
2010	Mikołaj Bojańczyk	ICALP (Bordeaux)

== EATCS Fellows ==
The EATCS Fellows Program has been established by the Association to recognize outstanding EATCS Members for their scientific achievements in the field of Theoretical Computer Science. The Fellow status is conferred by the EATCS Fellows-Selection Committee upon a person having a track record of intellectual and organizational leadership within the EATCS community. Fellows are expected to be “model citizens” of the TCS community, helping to develop the standing of TCS beyond the frontiers of the community.

Awarded	Recognized Year
Luca Aceto	2021
Jiri Adamek	2018
Susanne Albers	2014
Rajeev Alur	2021
Giorgio Ausiello	2014
Wilfried Brauer	2014
Artur Czumaj	2015
Pierpaolo Degano	2020
Mariangiola Dezani-Ciancaglini	2015
Josep Diaz	2017
Herbert Edelsbrunner	2014
Zoltán Ésik	2016
Mike Fellows	2014
Fedor Fomin	2019
Yuri Gurevich	2014
Mohammad Hajiaghayi	2020
Magnús M. Halldórsson	2020
David Harel	2016
Monika Henzinger	2014
Thomas A. Henzinger	2015
Giuseppe F. Italiano	2016
Samir Khuller	2021
Dexter Kozen	2015
Marta Kwiatkowska	2017
Stefano Leonardi	2018
Kurt Mehlhorn	2016
Rocco de Nicola	2019
David Peleg	2021
Jean-Éric Pin	2014
Dana Ron	2019
Davide Sangiorgi	2021
Saket Saurabh	2021
Scott A. Smolka	2016
Paul Spirakis	2014
Aravind Srinivasan	2017
Wolfgang Thomas	2014
Moshe Y. Vardi	2015
Moti Yung	2017

== EATCS Bulletin ==
The EATCS Bulletin is a newsletter of the EATCS, published online three times annually in February, June, and October respectively. The Bulletin is a medium for rapid publication and wide distribution of material such as:

- EATCS matters;
- information about the current ICALP;
- technical contributions;
- columns;
- surveys and tutorials;
- reports on conferences;
- calendar of events;
- reports on computer science departments and institutes;
- listings of technical reports and publications;
- book reviews;
- open problems and solutions;
- abstracts of PhD Theses;
- information on visitors at various institutions; and
- entertaining contributions and pictures related to computer science.

Since 2021 its editor-in-chief has been Stefan Schmid (TU Berlin).

== EATCS Young Researchers Schools ==
Beginning in 2014, the European Association for Theoretical Computer Science (EATCS) established a series of Young Researcher Schools on TCS topics. A brief history of the schools follows below.

Year	Type	Place
2017	ProbProgSchool 2017 – 1st School on Foundations of Programming and Software systems. Probabilistic programming	Braga, Portugal
2015	2nd EATCS Young Researchers School – Understanding COMPLEXITY and CONCURRENCY through TOPOLOGY of DATA	Camerino, Italy
2014	1st EATCS Young Researchers School – Automata, Logic and Games	Telč, Czech Republic

== See also ==
- List of computer science awards
