= International Colloquium on Automata, Languages and Programming =

- Abbreviation: ICALP
- Discipline: Theoretical computer science

Publication details
- Publisher: LIPIcs
- History: 1972–
- Frequency: annual (since 1976)
- Open access: yes

ICALP, the International Colloquium on Automata, Languages, and Programming is an academic conference organized annually by the European Association for Theoretical Computer Science and held in different locations around Europe. Like most theoretical computer science conferences its contributions are strongly peer-reviewed. The articles have appeared in proceedings published by Springer in their Lecture Notes in Computer Science, but beginning in 2016 they are instead published by the Leibniz International Proceedings in Informatics.

The ICALP conference series was established by Maurice Nivat, who organized the first ICALP in Paris, France in 1972. The second ICALP was held in 1974, and since 1976 ICALP has been an annual event, nowadays usually taking place in July.

Since 1999, the conference was thematically split into two tracks on "Algorithms, Complexity and Games" (Track A) and "Automata, Logic, Semantics, and Theory of Programming" (Track B), corresponding to the (at least until 2005) two main streams of the journal Theoretical Computer Science. Beginning with the 2005 conference, a third track (Track C) was added in order to allow deeper coverage of a particular topic. From 2005 until 2008, the third track was dedicated to "Security and Cryptography Foundations", and in 2009, it is devoted to the topic "Foundations of Networked Computation: Models, Algorithms and Information Management". Track C was dropped from the 2020 conference, with submissions from these areas invited to submit into Track A. Because of the COVID-19 pandemic, the 2020 conference was also unusual, taking place virtually for the first time (having been originally scheduled to take place in Beijing, China and later moved to Saarbrücken, Germany). ICALP 2021 took place virtually too.

== Gödel Prize ==
The Gödel Prize, a prize for outstanding papers in theoretical computer science and awarded jointly by the EATCS and the ACM SIGACT, is presented every second year at ICALP. Presentation of the prize, which is awarded annually, alternates with the conference STOC (ACM Symposium on Theory of Computing).

== See also ==
- The list of computer science conferences contains other academic conferences in computer science.
- The topics of the conference cover the field of theoretical computer science.
