= Helmut Alt =

German computer scientist

Helmut Alt (born 1950) is a German computer scientist whose research concerns graph algorithms and computational geometry. He is known for his work on matching geometric shapes, including methods for efficiently computing the Fréchet distance between shapes. He was also the first to use the German phrase "Algorithmische Geometrie" [algorithmic geometry] to refer to computational geometry. He is a professor of computer science at the Free University of Berlin.

== Education and career ==
Alt was born in 1950 in Wolfersweiler, a town in Saarland that later became incorporated into Nohfelden. He became a student of Kurt Mehlhorn at Saarland University, where he completed his Ph.D. in 1976 on algorithms for parsing context-free languages.

At the Free University of Berlin, he became the doctoral advisor of many successful students, including Otfried Cheong (1992), Johannes Blömer (1993), Christian Knauer (2002), Carola Wenk (2002), and Maike Buchin (2007).

== Recognition ==
The Free University of Berlin held a symposium on 2015 in honor of Alt's 65th birthday. Another symposium in honor of Alt and Günter Rote was held in 2022 at the Free University of Berlin, in conjunction with the annual International Symposium on Computational Geometry. At the same International Symposium on Computational Geometry, Alt's work with Michael Godau on using Fréchet distance to measure the similarity of shapes (announced at the 1992 symposium and published in a 1995 journal paper) was given the SoCG Test of Time Award.

== Selected publications ==
=== Edited volumes ===
- Computational Discrete Mathematics: Advanced Lectures (Springer, LNCS 2122, 2001)
- Efficient Algorithms: Essays Dedicated to Kurt Mehlhorn on the Occasion of His 60th Birthday (with Susanne Albers and Stefan Näher, Springer, LNCS 5760, 2009)
- Algorithms Unplugged (with B. Vöcking, M. Dietzfelbinger, R. Reischuk, C. Scheideler, H. Vollmer, and D. Wagner, Springer, 2011)

=== Research articles ===
- Alt, H.; Blum, N.; Mehlhorn, K.; Paul, M. (1991), "Computing a maximum cardinality matching in a bipartite graph in time $O(n^{1.5}\sqrt{m/\log n})$", Information Processing Letters, 37 (4): 237–240, doi:10.1016/0020-0190(91)90195-N, MR 1095712
- Alt, Helmut; Behrends, Bernd; Blömer, Johannes (1995), "Approximate matching of polygonal shapes", Annals of Mathematics and Artificial Intelligence, 13 (3–4): 251–265, doi:10.1007/BF01530830, MR 1335736, S2CID 16275664
- Alt, Helmut; Godau, Michael (1995), "Computing the Fréchet distance between two polygonal curves", International Journal of Computational Geometry and Applications, 5 (1–2): 75–91, doi:10.1142/S0218195995000064, MR 1331177
- Alt, Helmut; Mehlhorn, Kurt; Wagener, Hubert; Welzl, Emo (1988), "Congruence, similarity, and symmetries of geometric objects", Discrete & Computational Geometry, 3 (3): 237–256, doi:10.1007/BF02187910, MR 0937285
- Alt, Helmut; Efrat, Alon; Rote, Günter; Wenk, Carola (2003), "Matching planar maps", Journal of Algorithms, 49 (2): 262–283, doi:10.1016/S0196-6774(03)00085-3, MR 2014509, S2CID 3998112
