= Advances in Difference Equations =

- Discipline: Difference equations
- Language: English
- Edited by: R. Agarwal, M. Bohner, E. Braverman

Publication details
- History: 2004–present
- Publisher: Springer Open
- Open access: Yes
- Impact factor: 0.335 (2016)

Standard abbreviations
- ISO 4: Adv. Differ. Equ.
- MathSciNet: Adv. Difference Equ.

Indexing
- ISSN: 1687-1839 (print); 1687-1847 (web)
- LCCN: 2006242013
- OCLC no.: 59228023

Links
- Journal homepage; Online access; Archived

Advances in Difference Equations is a peer-reviewed mathematics journal covering research on difference equations, published by Springer Open.

The journal was established in 2004 and publishes articles on theory, methodology, and application of difference and differential equations. Originally published by Hindawi Publishing Corporation, the journal was acquired by Springer Science+Business Media in early 2011. The editors-in-chief are Ravi Agarwal, Martin Bohner, and Elena Braverman.

== Abstracting and indexing ==
The journal is abstracted and indexed by the Science Citation Index Expanded, Current Contents/Physical, Chemical & Earth Sciences, and Zentralblatt MATH. According to the Journal Citation Reports, the journal has a 2021 impact factor of 2.803. from July 1, the journal has been transitioning to a new title that opens the scope of the journal to broader developments in theory and applications of models. Under the new title, Advances in Continuous and Discrete Models: Theory and Modern Applications, the journal will cover developments in machine learning, data driven modeling, differential equations, numerical analysis, scientific computing, control, optimization, and computing.
