= Gautam Kamath =

Ph.D. Massachusetts Institute of Technology 2018

- Education: Cornell University (BS); Massachusetts Institute of Technology (SM, PhD)
- Awards: Gödel Prize (2026); Presburger Award (2026)
- Scientific career
- Fields: Theoretical computer science, machine learning, differential privacy, robust statistics
- Workplaces: University of Waterloo; Vector Institute
- Doctoral advisor: Constantinos Daskalakis
- Website: www.gautamkamath.com

Gautam Kamath is a computer scientist known for his work in algorithmic robust statistics and differential privacy. He is an assistant professor at the David R. Cheriton School of Computer Science at the University of Waterloo, a faculty member at the Vector Institute, and a Canada CIFAR AI Chair. He received the 2026 Gödel Prize and the 2026 Presburger Award.

== Education and career ==
Kamath received a Bachelor of Science from Cornell University in 2012, and a Master of Science (2014) and PhD (2018) from the Massachusetts Institute of Technology. He was a Microsoft Research Fellow at the Simons Institute for the Theory of Computing before joining the University of Waterloo as an assistant professor in 2019. He is expected to join the Computer Science department at the Courant Institute of Mathematical Sciences at New York University in September 2026.

== Research ==
Kamath's research concerns algorithms and machine learning under constraints such as data privacy and robustness.

With Ilias Diakonikolas, Daniel Kane, Jerry Li, Ankur Moitra, and Alistair Stewart, Kamath co-authored the paper "Robust Estimators in High-Dimensions without the Computational Intractability", first presented at the 2016 Symposium on Foundations of Computer Science and published in the SIAM Journal on Computing in 2019. The paper gave the first polynomial-time algorithms for high-dimensional estimation in the presence of adversarially corrupted data with error guarantees independent of the dimension, resolving a longstanding problem in robust statistics. The work is credited with establishing the area of algorithmic high-dimensional robust statistics.

With Clément Canonne and Thomas Steinke, Kamath developed the discrete Gaussian mechanism for differential privacy, presented at NeurIPS 2020, which was deployed in the 2020 United States census.

== Awards and honors ==
- Gödel Prize, 2026, with Ilias Diakonikolas, Daniel Kane, Jerry Li, Ankur Moitra, and Alistair Stewart, for "Robust Estimators in High-Dimensions without the Computational Intractability"
- Presburger Award of the European Association for Theoretical Computer Science, 2026
- Caspar Bowden Award for Outstanding Research in Privacy Enhancing Technologies, 2024, with Clément Canonne and Thomas Steinke, for "The Discrete Gaussian for Differential Privacy"
- Best paper award, International Conference on Machine Learning (ICML), 2024, with Florian Tramèr and Nicholas Carlini
- Canada CIFAR AI Chair
