= Kasper Green Larsen =

Danish theoretical computer scientist

- Born: 1986 (age 39–40)
- Education: Aarhus University
- Awards: Presburger Award (2019); Danny Lewin Award (2012); Machtey Award (2011)
- Scientific career
- Fields: Theoretical Computer Science
- Workplaces: Aarhus University
- Thesis: (2013)
- Doctoral advisor: Lars Arge
- Website: cs.au.dk/~larsen/

Kasper Green Larsen is a Danish theoretical computer scientist. He is currently full professor at Aarhus University.

== Biography ==
Larsen earned his doctorate from Aarhus University in 2013 under the supervision of Lars Arge.

He received several best paper awards at major conferences in theoretical computer science, including Symposium on Theory of Computing, Symposium on Foundations of Computer Science, Conference on Learning Theory, and the International Cryptology Conference, including the Machtey Award and Danny Lewin Award for best student paper.

In 2019, Larsen received the Presburger Award from the European Association of Theoretical Computer Science for his work on lower bounds.
