= Mathematician =

Person with an extensive knowledge of mathematics

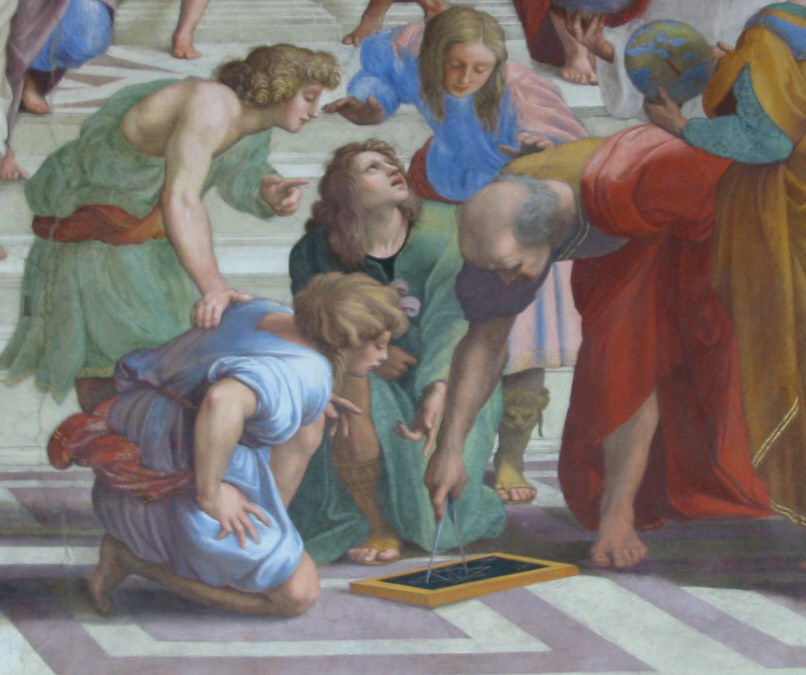
- Euclid (holding calipers), Greek mathematician, known as the "Father of Geometry"

Occupation
- Occupation type: Academic

Description
- Competencies: Mathematics, analytical skills and critical thinking skills
- Education required: Doctoral degree, occasionally master's degree
- Fields of employment: universities, private corporations, financial industry, government
- Related jobs: statistician, actuary

A mathematician is someone who uses an extensive knowledge of mathematics in their work, typically to solve mathematical problems. Mathematicians are concerned with numbers, data, quantity, structure, space, models, and change.

== History ==
One of the earliest known mathematicians was Thales of Miletus (c. 624 – c. 546 BC); He has been hailed as the first true mathematician and the first known individual to whom a mathematical discovery has been attributed. He is credited with the first use of deductive reasoning applied to geometry, by deriving four corollaries to Thales's theorem.

The number of known mathematicians grew when Pythagoras of Samos (c. 582 – c. 507 BC) established the Pythagorean school, whose doctrine it was that mathematics ruled the universe and whose motto was "All is number".

Archimedes was one of the greatest figures in the history of mathematics. He made significant contributions to geometry, providing proofs for the area of a circle and the volume and surface area of a sphere. He also gave a good approximation of π using polygons. He also developed the method of exhaustion, which is an early form of integral calculus. He furthered the study of centers of mass and mathematical statics. His precise methods had a strong impact on later mathematics and mathematical physics. Euclid and Apollonius were prominent ancient Greek mathematicians, with Euclid's Elements establishing geometry through axioms and logical proofs and laying the foundation of the axiomatic method, while Apollonius' Conics systematically developed the theory of ellipses, parabolas, and hyperbolas, significantly advancing the study of curves and influencing later geometry.

The first female mathematician recorded by history was Hypatia of Alexandria (c. AD 350 – 415). She succeeded her father as librarian at the Great Library and wrote many works on applied mathematics. Because of a political dispute, the Christian community in Alexandria punished her, presuming she was involved, by stripping her naked and scraping off her skin with clamshells (some say roofing tiles).

Science and mathematics in the Islamic world during the Middle Ages followed various models and modes of funding varied based primarily on scholars. It was extensive patronage and strong intellectual policies implemented by specific rulers that allowed scientific knowledge to develop in many areas. Funding for translation of scientific texts in other languages was ongoing throughout the reign of certain caliphs, and it turned out that certain scholars became experts in the works they translated, and in turn received further support for continuing to develop certain sciences. As these sciences received wider attention from the elite, more scholars were invited and funded to study particular sciences. An example of a translator and mathematician who benefited from this type of support was Al-Khawarizmi. A notable feature of many scholars working under Muslim rule in medieval times is that they were often polymaths. Examples include the work on optics, maths and astronomy of Ibn al-Haytham.

Noteworthy Indian mathematicians from this time period include Aryabhata, who applied trigonometry to astronomy; Brahmagupta, credited with the first systematic explanation of negative numbers and zero; and the mathematician and astronomer Bhāskara II. Mādhava of Sangamagrāma is considered to be the founder of the Kerala school of astronomy and mathematics in the Late Middle Ages. He made pioneering contributions to the study of infinite series, trigonometry, geometry and algebra.

The Renaissance brought an increased emphasis on mathematics and science to Europe. During this period of transition from a mainly feudal and ecclesiastical culture to a predominantly secular one, many notable mathematicians had other occupations: Luca Pacioli (founder of accounting); Niccolò Fontana Tartaglia (notable engineer and bookkeeper); Gerolamo Cardano (earliest founder of probability and binomial expansion); Robert Recorde (physician) and François Viète (lawyer).

As time passed, many mathematicians gravitated towards universities. An emphasis on free thinking and experimentation had begun in Britain's oldest universities beginning in the seventeenth century at Oxford with the scientists Robert Hooke and Robert Boyle, and at Cambridge where Isaac Newton was Lucasian Professor of Mathematics & Physics. Moving into the 19th century, the objective of universities all across Europe evolved from teaching the "regurgitation of knowledge" to "encourag[ing] productive thinking." In 1810, Alexander von Humboldt convinced the king of Prussia, Fredrick William III, to build a university in Berlin based on Friedrich Schleiermacher's liberal ideas; the goal was to demonstrate the process of the discovery of knowledge and to teach students to "take account of fundamental laws of science in all their thinking." Thus, seminars and laboratories started to evolve.

British universities of this period adopted some approaches familiar to the Italian and German universities, but as they already enjoyed substantial freedoms and autonomy the changes there had begun with the Age of Enlightenment, the same influences that inspired Humboldt. The Universities of Oxford and Cambridge emphasized the importance of research, arguably more authentically implementing Humboldt's idea of a university than even German universities, which were subject to state authority. Overall, science (including mathematics) became the focus of universities in the 19th and 20th centuries. Students could conduct research in seminars or laboratories and began to produce doctoral theses with more scientific content. According to Humboldt, the mission of the University of Berlin was to pursue scientific knowledge. The German university system fostered professional, bureaucratically regulated scientific research performed in well-equipped laboratories, instead of the kind of research done by private and individual scholars in Great Britain and France. In fact, Rüegg asserts that the German system is responsible for the development of the modern research university because it focused on the idea of "freedom of scientific research, teaching and study."

== Required education ==
Mathematicians usually cover a breadth of topics within mathematics in their undergraduate education, and then proceed to specialize in topics of their own choice at the graduate level. In some universities, a qualifying exam serves to test both the breadth and depth of a student's understanding of mathematics; the students who pass are permitted to work on a doctoral dissertation.

== Activities ==
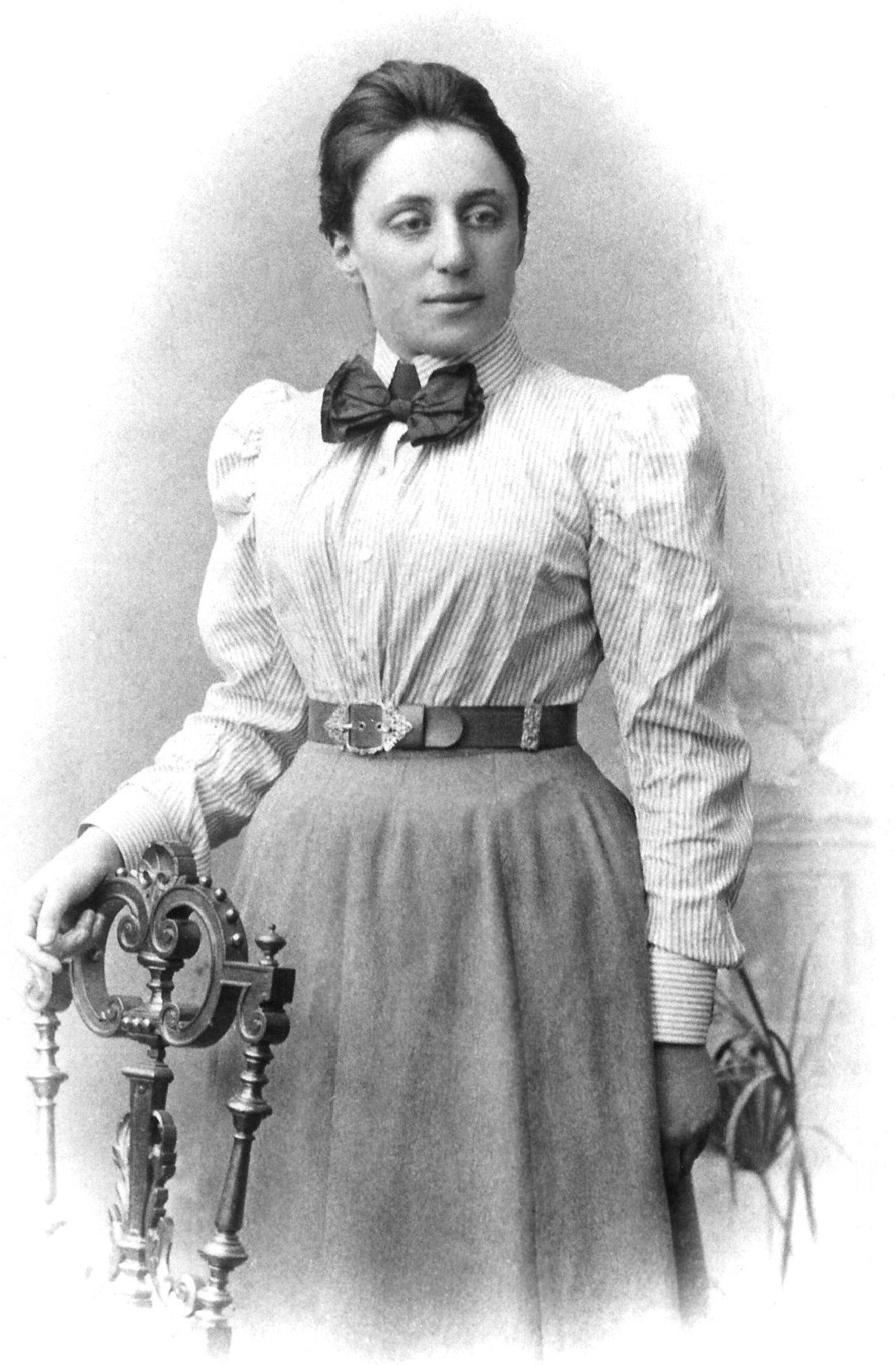
Emmy Noether, mathematical theorist and teacher

=== Applied mathematics ===
Mathematicians involved with solving problems with applications in real life are called applied mathematicians. Applied mathematicians are mathematical scientists who, with their specialized knowledge and professional methodology, approach many of the imposing problems presented in related scientific fields. With professional focus on a wide variety of problems, theoretical systems, and localized constructs, applied mathematicians work regularly in the study and formulation of mathematical models. Mathematicians and applied mathematicians are considered to be two of the STEM (science, technology, engineering, and mathematics) careers.

The discipline of applied mathematics concerns itself with mathematical methods that are typically used in science, engineering, business, and industry; thus, "applied mathematics" is a mathematical science with specialized knowledge. The term "applied mathematics" also describes the professional specialty in which mathematicians work on problems, often concrete but sometimes abstract. As professionals focused on problem solving, applied mathematicians look into the formulation, study, and use of mathematical models in science, engineering, business, and other areas of mathematical practice.

=== Pure mathematics ===
Pure mathematics is mathematics that studies entirely abstract concepts. From the eighteenth century onwards, this was a recognized category of mathematical activity, sometimes characterized as speculative mathematics, and at variance with the trend towards meeting the needs of navigation, astronomy, physics, economics, engineering, and other applications.

Another insightful view put forth is that pure mathematics is not necessarily applied mathematics: it is possible to study abstract entities with respect to their intrinsic nature, and not be concerned with how they manifest in the real world. Even though the pure and applied viewpoints are distinct philosophical positions, in practice there is much overlap in the activity of pure and applied mathematicians.

To develop accurate models for describing the real world, many applied mathematicians draw on tools and techniques that are often considered to be "pure" mathematics. On the other hand, many pure mathematicians draw on natural and social phenomena as inspiration for their abstract research.

=== Mathematics teaching ===
Many professional mathematicians also engage in the teaching of mathematics. Duties may include:

- teaching university mathematics courses;
- supervising undergraduate and graduate research; and
- serving on academic committees.

=== Consulting ===
Many careers in mathematics outside of universities involve consulting. For instance, actuaries assemble and analyze data to estimate the probability and likely cost of the occurrence of an event such as death, sickness, injury, disability, or loss of property. Actuaries also address financial questions, including those involving the level of pension contributions required to produce a certain retirement income and the way in which a company should invest resources to maximize its return on investments in light of potential risk. Using their broad knowledge, actuaries help design and price insurance policies, pension plans, and other financial strategies in a manner which will help ensure that the plans are maintained on a sound financial basis.

As another example, mathematical finance will derive and extend the mathematical or numerical models without necessarily establishing a link to financial theory, taking observed market prices as input. Mathematical consistency is required, not compatibility with economic theory. Thus, for example, while a financial economist might study the structural reasons why a company may have a certain share price, a financial mathematician may take the share price as a given, and attempt to use stochastic calculus to obtain the corresponding value of derivatives of the stock (see: Valuation of options; Financial modeling).

== Occupations ==
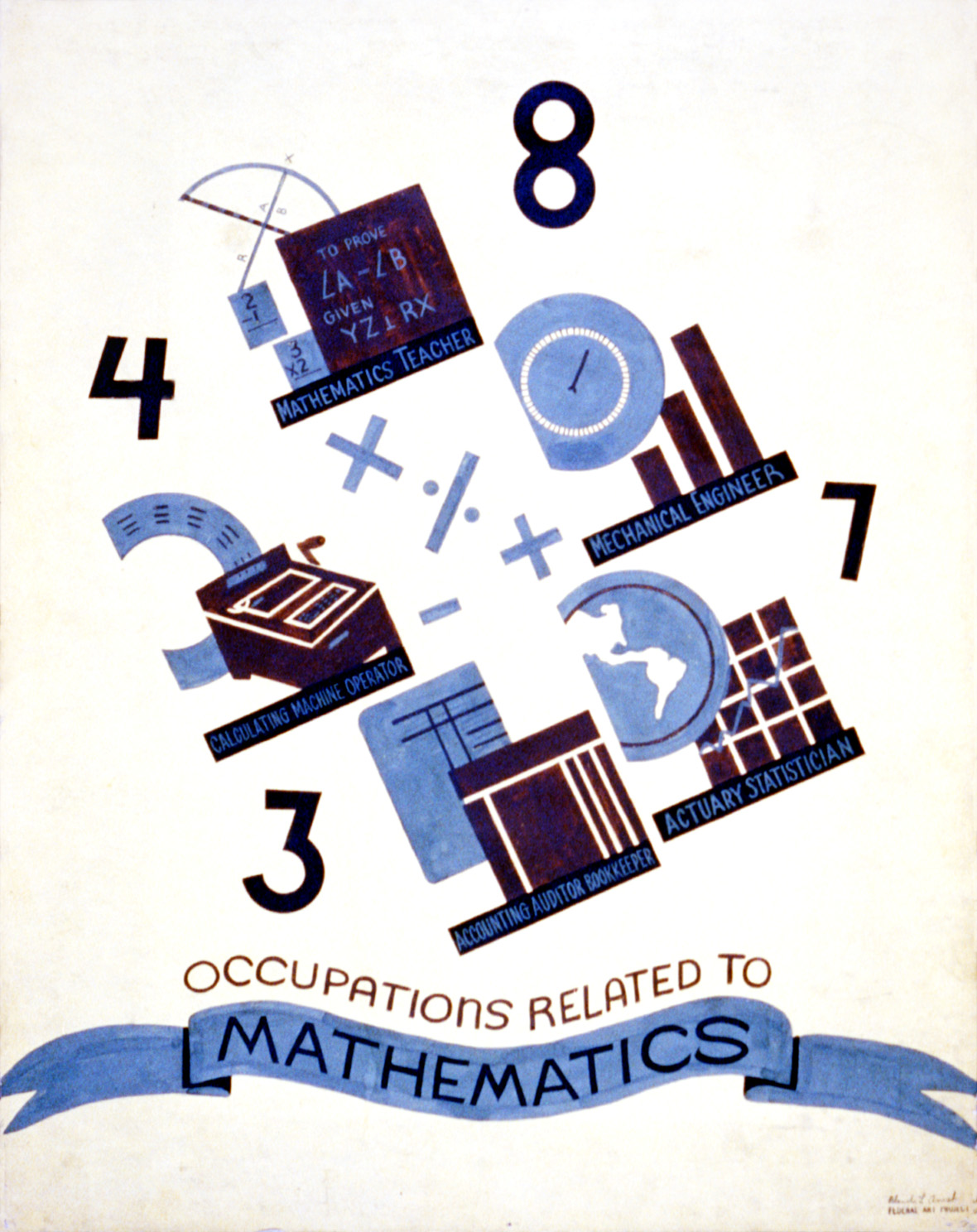
In 1938 in the United States, mathematicians were desired as teachers, calculating machine operators, mechanical engineers, accounting auditor bookkeepers, and actuary statisticians.

According to the Dictionary of Occupational Titles occupations in mathematics include the following.

- Mathematician
- Operations-Research Analyst
- Mathematical Statistician
- Mathematical Technician
- Actuary
- Applied Statistician
- Weight Analyst

== Prizes in mathematics ==
There is no Nobel Prize in mathematics, though sometimes mathematicians have won the Nobel Prize in a different field, such as economics or physics. Prominent prizes in mathematics include the Abel Prize, the Chern Medal, the Fields Medal, the Gauss Prize, the Nemmers Prize, the Balzan Prize, the Crafoord Prize, the Shaw Prize, the Steele Prize, the Wolf Prize, the Schock Prize, and the Nevanlinna Prize.

The American Mathematical Society, Association for Women in Mathematics, and other mathematical societies offer several prizes aimed at increasing the representation of women and minorities in the future of mathematics.

== Mathematical autobiographies ==
Several well known mathematicians have written autobiographies in part to explain to a general audience what it is about mathematics that has made them want to devote their lives to its study. These provide some of the best glimpses into what it means to be a mathematician. The following list contains some works that are not autobiographies, but rather essays on mathematics and mathematicians with strong autobiographical elements.

- The Book of My Life – Girolamo Cardano
- A Russian Childhood - Sofya Kovaleskaya
- A Mathematician's Apology - G.H. Hardy
- A Mathematician's Miscellany (republished as Littlewood's miscellany) – J. E. Littlewood
- I Am a Mathematician - Norbert Wiener
- I Want to Be a Mathematician - Paul R. Halmos
- Adventures of a Mathematician - Stanislaw Ulam
- Enigmas of Chance - Mark Kac
- The Apprenticeship of a Mathematician - André Weil
- Indiscrete Thoughts - Gian-Carlo Rota
- A Mathematician Grappling with His Century - Laurent Schwartz
- Saunders Mac Lane: A Mathematical Autobiography – Saunders Mac Lane
- The Map of My Life – Goro Shimura
- Yesterday and Long Ago - V.I. Arnold
- Random Curves – Neal Koblitz
- Жизнеописание Льва Семеновича Понтрягина, математика, составленное им самим (trans. Biography of Lev Semionovich Pontryagin, Mathematician, Composed by Himself) – Lev Pontryagin
- Love and Math – Edward Frenkel
- Mathematics Without Apologies – Michael Harris

== See also ==
- Lists of mathematicians
- List of films about mathematicians
- Human computer – Person performing mathematical calculations, before electronic calculators
- Mathematical joke – Humor about mathematics or mathematicians
- A Mathematician's Apology – 1940 essay by British mathematician G. H. Hardy
- Men of Mathematics – Popular history book of mathematics by E.T. Bell
- Mental calculator – Arithmetical calculations using only the human brain
- Timeline of ancient Greek mathematicians

== Bibliography ==
- Abattouy, Mohammed; Renn, Jürgen; Weinig, Paul (2001). "Transmission as Transformation: The Translation Movements in the Medieval East and West in a Comparative Perspective". Science in Context. 14 (1–2). Cambridge University Press: 1–12. doi:10.1017/S0269889701000011. S2CID 145190232.
- Boyer (1991). A History of Mathematics.
- Dunham, William (1994). The Mathematical Universe. John Wiley.
- Halmos, Paul (1985). I Want to Be a Mathematician. Springer-Verlag.
- Hardy, G.H. (2012) [1940]. A Mathematician's Apology (Reprinted with foreword ed.). Cambridge University Press. ISBN 978-1-107-60463-6. OCLC 942496876.
- Rüegg, Walter (2004). "Themes". In Rüegg, Walter (ed.). A History of the University in Europe. Vol. 3. Cambridge University Press. ISBN 978-0-521-36107-1.
