= Ravi Agarwal =

Indian mathematician

Ravi P. Agarwal
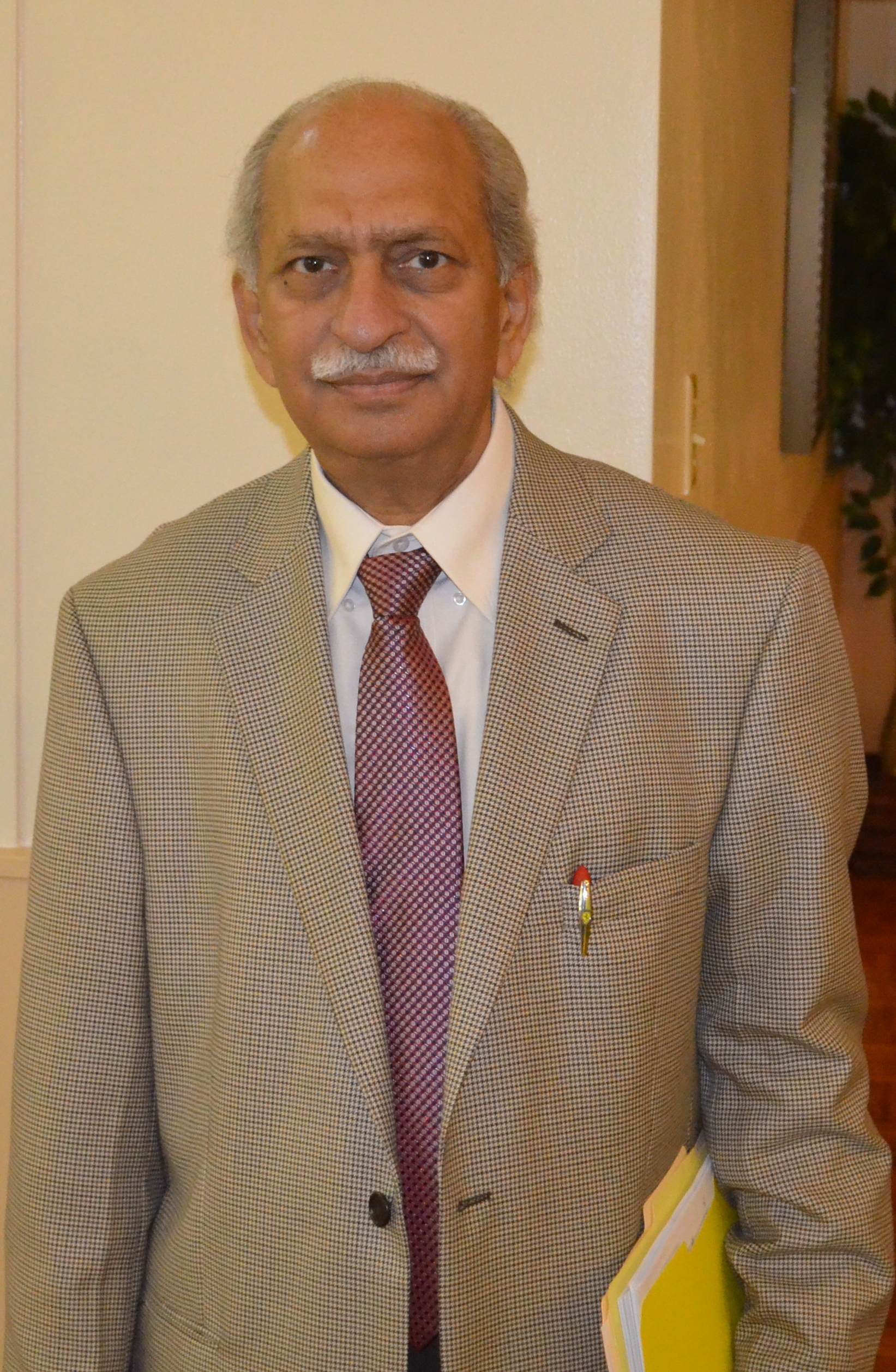
- Born: 10 July 1947
- Died: 2 December 2025
- Education: Indian Institute of Technology (Indian School of Mines) Dhanbad
- Known for: Numerical Analysis Differential and Difference Equations Inequalities Fixed Point Theorems
- Scientific career
- Fields: Mathematics
- Workplaces: University-Kingsville Kingsville

Ravi P. Agarwal (July 10, 1947 - December 2, 2025) was an Indian mathematician, Ph.D. sciences, professor, professor & chairman, Department of Mathematics Texas A&M University-Kingsville, Kingsville, U.S. Agarwal is the author of over 1000 scientific papers as well as 30 monographs. He was previously a professor in the Department of Mathematical Sciences at Florida Institute of Technology.

== Monographs and books ==
1. R.P. Agarwal, Boundary Value Problems for Higher Order Differential Equations, World Scientific, Singapore, Philadelphia, 1986, p. 307.
2. R.P. Agarwal and R.C. Gupta, Essentials of Ordinary Differential Equations, McGraw-Hill Book Co., Singapore, New York, 1991, p. 467.
3. R.P. Agarwal, Difference Equations and Inequalities : Theory, Methods and Applications, Marcel Dekker, Inc., New York, 1992, p. 777.
4. R.P. Agarwal and V. Lakshmikantham, Uniqueness and Nonuniqueness Criteria for Ordinary Differential Equations, World Scientific, Singapore, 1993, p. 312.
5. R.P. Agarwal and P.J.Y. Wong, Error Inequalities in Polynomial Interpolation and Their Applications, Kluwer Academic Publishers, Dordrecht, 1993, p. 365.
6. R.P. Agarwal and R.C. Gupta, Solutions Manual to Accompany Essentials of Ordinary Differential Equations, McGraw-Hill Book Co., Singapore, New York, 1993, p. 209.
7. R.P. Agarwal and P.Y.H. Pang, Opial Inequalities with Applications in Differential and Difference Equations, Kluwer Academic Publishers, Dordrecht, 1995, p. 393.
8. R.P. Agarwal and P.J.Y. Wong, Advanced Topics in Difference Equations, Kluwer Academic Publishers, Dordrecht, 1997, p. 507.
9. R.P. Agarwal, Focal Boundary Value Problems for Differential and Difference Equations, Kluwer Academic Publishers, Dordrecht, 1998, p. 289.
10. R.P. Agarwal, D. O’Regan and P.J.Y. Wong, Positive Solutions of Differential, Difference and Integral Equations, Kluwer Academic Publishers, Dordrecht, 1999, p. 417.
11. R.P. Agarwal, Difference Equations and Inequalities: Second Edition, Revised and Expended, Marcel Dekker, New York, 2000, xv+980pp.
12. R.P. Agarwal, M. Meehan and D. O’Regan, Fixed Point Theory and Applications, Cambridge University Press, Cambridge, 2001, 170pp.
13. R.P. Agarwal, S.R. Grace and D. O’Regan, Oscillation Theory for Difference and Functional Differential Equations, Kluwer Academic Publishers, Dordrecht, 2000, 337pp.
14. R.P. Agarwal and D. O’Regan, Infinite Interval Problems for Differential, Difference and Integral Equations, Kluwer Academic Publishers, Dordrecht, 2001, 341pp.
15. R.P. Agarwal, M. Meehan and D. O’Regan, Nonlinear Integral Equations and Inclusions, Nova Science Publishers, New York, 2001, 362pp.
16. R.P. Agarwal, S.R. Grace and D. O’Regan, Oscillation Theory for Second Order Linear, Half–linear, Superlinear and Sublinear Dynamic Equations, Kluwer Academic Publishers, The Netherlands, 2002, 672pp.
17. R.P. Agarwal, S.R. Grace and D. O’Regan, Oscillation Theory for Second Order Dynamic Equations, Taylor & Francis, U.K., 2003, 404pp.
18. R.P. Agarwal and D. O’Regan, Singular Differential and Integral Equations with Applications, Kluwer Academic Publishers, Dordrecht, 2003, 402pp.
19. R.P. Agarwal, M. Bohner and W.-T. Li, Nonoscillation and Oscillation Theory for Functional Differential Equations, Marcel Dekker, New York, 2004, 376pp.
20. R.P. Agarwal, M. Bohner, S.R. Grace and D. O’Regan, Discrete Oscillation Theory, Hindawi Publishing Corporation, 2005, 1000pp.
21. R.P. Agarwal and D. O’Regan, An Introduction to Ordinary Differential Equations, Springer, New York, 2008.
22. R.P. Agarwal and D. O’Regan, Ordinary and Partial Differential Equations with Special Functions, Fourier Series and Boundary Value Problems, Springer, New York, 2009.
23. R.P. Agarwal, D. O’Regan and D.R. Sahu, Fixed Point Theory for Lipschitzian–type Mappings with Applications, Springer, New York, 2009
24. R.P. Agarwal, S. Ding and C.A. Nolder, Inequalities for Differential Forms, Springer, New York, 2009.
25. K. Perera, R.P. Agarwal and D. O’Regan, Morse Theoretic Aspects of p–Laplacian Type Operators, Mathematical Surveys and Monographs, Volume 161, American Mathematical Society, Providence Island, 2010.
26. R.P. Agarwal, K. Perera and S. Pinelas, An Introduction to Complex Analysis, Springer, New York, 2011.
27. S.K. Sen and R.P. Agarwal, π, e, φ with MATLAB: Random and Rational Sequences with Scope in Supercomputing Era, Cambridge Scientific Publishers, Cambridge, 2011.
28. R.P. Agarwal, L. Berezansky, E. Braverman and A. Domoshnitsky, Nonoscillation Theory of Functional Differential Equations with Applications, Springer, New York, 2012.
29. A. Aral, V. Gupta and R. P. Agarwal, Applications of q–Calculus in Operator Theory, Springer, New York, 2013.
30. R.P. Agarwal, D. O’Regan and P.J.Y. Wong, Constant–Sign Solutions of Systems of Integral Equations, Springer, in press, Springer, New York, 2015.

== Editorial board membership ==
1. Editor-in-Chief, Journal of Inequalities and Applications, Springer, U.S.
2. Editor-in-Chief, Advances in Difference Equations, Springer, U.S.
3. Editor-in-Chief, Boundary Value Problems, Springer, U.S.
4. Editor-in-Chief, Fixed Point Theory and Applications, Springer, U.S.
5. Editor, Advances in Mathematical Finance and Applications, IAU of Arak, Iran.
6. Senior Editor, Applied Mathematics and Computation, Elsevier, The Netherlands.
7. Editor, Series in Mathematical Analysis and Applications, Gordon and Breach, U.K.
8. Editor, World Scientific Series in Applicable Analysis, World Scientific, Singapore
9. Editor, Nonlinear Oscillations, The Publication of the Institute of Mathematics, National Academy of Sciences of Ukraine, Ukraine
