= Paul Spirakis =

Paul Spirakis is a Professor of Computer Science at the University of Liverpool, specialising in Algorithms, Complexity and Algorithmic Game Theory. He has been a professor at the University of Liverpool since 2013 and, he also is a professor at Patras University. He leads the Algorithms Research section in the Department of Computer Science at the University of Liverpool. He is a Fellow of EATCS and a Member of Academia Europaea.

He was the Editor-in-Chief (Track A) of the journal Theoretical Computer Science and president of the EATCS from 2016-2020.

He completed his S.M in Applied Mathematics (Computer Science) at Harvard University in 1979 followed by a PhD in Applied Mathematics (Computer Science) also at Harvard University in 1982 (supervised by John Reif).
