= Mark Braverman (mathematician) =

Israeli mathematician and computer scientist

- מארק ברוורמן
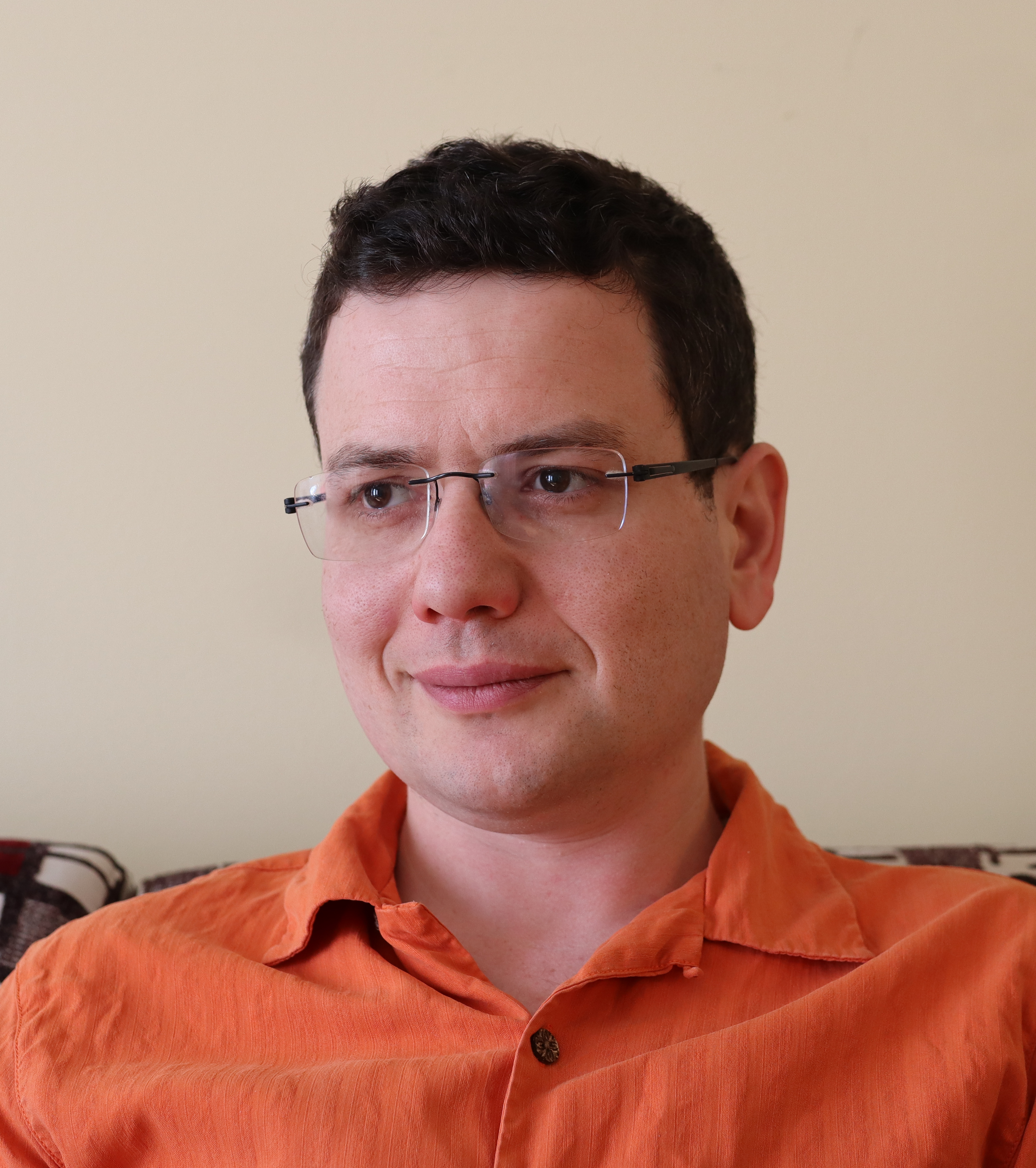
- Born: 1984; Perm, Russian SFSR, Soviet Union
- Education: University of Toronto
- Awards: Stephen Smale Prize 2014; EMS Prize 2016; Presburger Award 2016; Waterman Award 2019; IMU Abacus Medal 2022
- Scientific career
- Fields: Computer science
- Workplaces: Microsoft Research; University of Toronto; Princeton University
- Thesis: Computability and Complexity of Julia Sets (2008)
- Doctoral advisor: Stephen Cook
- Website: www.cs.princeton.edu/~mbraverm/pmwiki/index.php

Mark Braverman (Hebrew: מארק ברוורמן; born 1984) is an Israeli mathematician and theoretical computer scientist. He was awarded an EMS Prize in 2016 as well as Presburger Award in the same year. In 2019, he was awarded the Alan T. Waterman Award. In 2022, he won the IMU Abacus Medal.

He earned his doctorate from the University of Toronto in 2008, under the supervision of Stephen Cook. After this, he did post-doctoral research at Microsoft Research and then joined the faculty at University of Toronto. In 2011, he joined the Princeton University department of computer science. In 2014, he was an Invited Speaker with talk Interactive information and coding theory at the International Congress of Mathematicians in Seoul.

Braverman is the son of mathematician Elena Braverman and, through her, the grandson of his co-author, mathematical statistician Yan Petrovich Lumel'skii.
