= Karl Bringmann =

German theoretical computer scientist

- Education: Saarland University
- Awards: Presburger Award; Heinz Maier-Leibnitz-Preis
- Scientific career
- Fields: Theoretical Computer Science
- Workplaces: Max Planck Institute for Informatics
- Doctoral advisor: Kurt Mehlhorn
- Website: people.mpi-inf.mpg.de/~kbringma/

Karl Bringmann is a German theoretical computer scientist. He is currently senior researcher at Max Planck Institute for Informatics.

== Biography ==
Bringmann earned his doctorate from Saarland University under the supervision of Kurt Mehlhorn.

In 2019, Bringmann received the Presburger Award from the European Association of Theoretical Computer Science for his work on lower bounds. The same year, he received the Heinz Maier-Leibnitz Prize from the German Research Foundation for his work on fine-grained complexity and a near-linear pseudopolynomial time algorithm for the subset sum problem. Furthermore, he was appointed as a professor at Saarland University.

In March 2025, he was appointed as Full Professor of Theoretical Computer Science in the Department of Computer Science at the ETH Zurich.
