= Shayan Oveis Gharan =

Iranian computer scientist and academic

Shayan Oveis Gharan (born 1986, Isfahan) is an Iranian computer scientist. He is an Edward D. Lazowska professor of computer science and engineering at the University of Washington. In 2026, he won the IMU Abacus Medal from the International Congress of Mathematicians for his novel use of mathematical tools for advancing computational algorithms.

== Life and works ==
Shayan Oveis Gharan won a gold medal at the International Olympiad in Informatics in 2004. After studying at Sharif University of Technology, he went to Stanford University, where he completed his Ph.D., and is now a professor at the University of Washington in Seattle.
