= Carola Wenk =

German-American computer scientist

Carola Wenk (born 1973) is a German-American computer scientist known for her research on algorithms for finding similarities between geometric shapes, such as matching vehicle trajectories to road networks, comparing trajectories with each other using Fréchet distance, or testing similarity for gel electrophoresis data. Her work has also involved biomedical applications of geometric algorithms, including the use of virtual reality to diagnose glaucoma. She is a professor of computer science at Tulane University.

== Education and career ==
Wenk is originally from Berlin. She earned a diploma in mathematics in 1998 at the Free University of Berlin with the thesis Algorithmen für das Crossdating in der Dendrochronologie (Algorithms for Crossdating in Dendrochronology) supervised by Helmut Alt. She continued to work with Alt at the Free University of Berlin and in 2002 completed a doctorate in computer science (Dr. rer. nat.) with the dissertation Shape Matching in Higher Dimensions.

After postdoctoral research with Alon Efrat at the University of Arizona, Wenk joined the faculty at the University of Texas at San Antonio in 2004. She chaired the faculty senate of the university from 2010 to 2012. As faculty senate chair, she oversaw a change in the university grading system to allow plus and minus modifiers in letter grades, and a policy to reduce the use of paper by making all campus printers and copiers double-sided.

She moved to Tulane University in 2012, and was promoted to full professor in 2017. Since 2021 she has been chair of the Department of Computer Science at Tulane. She also holds an adjunct position in the mathematics department.

== Book ==
With Mahmuda Ahmed, Sophia Karagiorgou, and Dieter Pfoser, Wenk is the co-author of the book Map Construction Algorithms (Springer, 2015).
