= Xi Chen =

Chinese computer scientist

- Education: Tsinghua University
- Known for: Computational complexity theory
- Awards: Gödel Prize (2021); Fulkerson Prize (2021); Presburger Award (2015); Sloan Research Fellowship (2012)
- Scientific career
- Fields: Computer theory
- Workplaces: Columbia University
- Website: Xi Chen at Columbia University

Xi Chen (Chinese: 陈汐) is a computer scientist. He is a professor of computer science at Columbia University. Chen won the 2021 Gödel Prize and Fulkerson Prize for his co-authored paper "Complexity of Counting CSP with Complex Weights" with Jin-Yi Cai.

== Biography ==
Chen received his B.S. and Ph.D. from Tsinghua University. He was a postdoctoral fellow at Institute for Advanced Study, Princeton University, University of Southern California, and joined the Columbia faculty in 2011.

Chen's research focuses on computational complexity theory. He also received a Presburger Award from the European Association for Theoretical Computer Science in 2015 and a Sloan Research Fellowship in 2012.
