= Kurt Mehlhorn =

German computer scientist (born 1949)

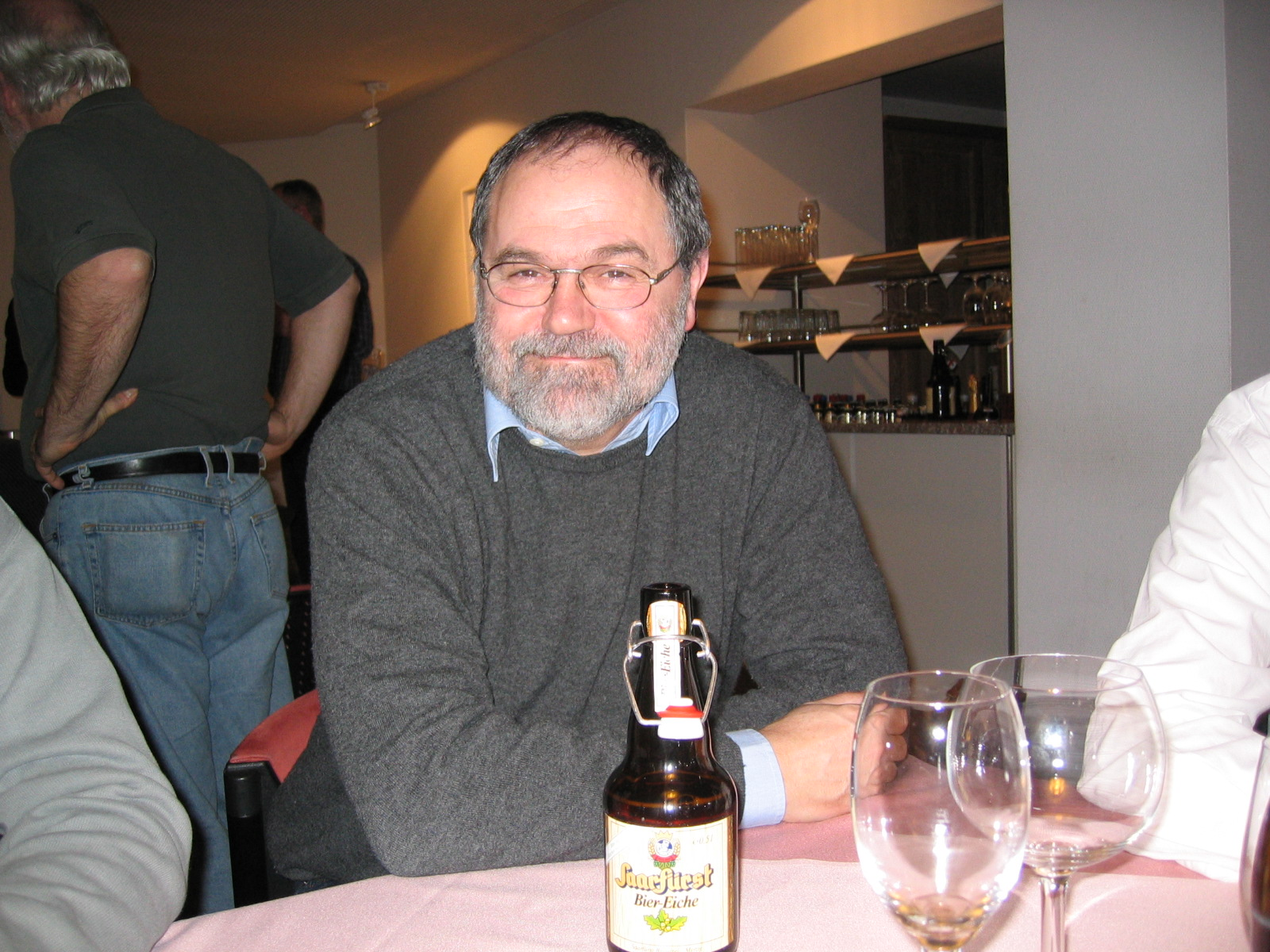
- Born: 29 August 1949 (age 77); Ingolstadt, West Germany
- Education: Cornell University
- Known for: LEDA
- Awards: Leibniz Prize; Konrad Zuse Medal (1995); EATCS Award; Paris Kanellakis Award (2010)
- Scientific career
- Fields: Computer science
- Workplaces: Universität des Saarlandes
- Doctoral advisor: Robert Lee Constable
- Doctoral students: Susanne Albers; Helmut Alt; Hannah Bast; Karl Bringmann; Carola Doerr

Kurt Mehlhorn (born 29 August 1949) is a German theoretical computer scientist. He has been a vice president of the Max Planck Society and is director of the Max Planck Institute for Computer Science.

== Education and career ==
Mehlhorn graduated in 1971 from the Technical University of Munich, where he studied computer science and mathematics, and earned his Ph.D. in 1974 from Cornell University under the supervision of Robert Constable. Since 1975 he has been on the faculty of Saarland University in Saarbrücken, Germany, where he was chair of the computer science department from 1976 to 1978 and again from 1987 to 1989. Since 1990 has been the director of the Max Planck Institute for Computer Science, also in Saarbrücken. He has been on the editorial boards of ten journals, a trustee of the International Computer Science Institute in Berkeley, California, and a member of the board of governors of Jacobs University Bremen. He also served on the Engineering and Computer Science jury for the Infosys Prize from 2009 to 2011.

== Awards and honors ==
He won the Gottfried Wilhelm Leibniz Prize in 1986, the Gay-Lussac-Humboldt-Prize in 1989, the Karl Heinz Beckurts Award in 1994, the Konrad Zuse Medal in 1995, the EATCS Award in 2010, and the Paris Kanellakis Award in 2010. He was named a member of the Academia Europaea in 1995, Fellow of the Association for Computing Machinery in 1999, a member of the Berlin-Brandenburg Academy of Sciences in 2001, a member of the German Academy of Sciences Leopoldina in 2004, a foreign member of the National Academy of Engineering in 2014, and a foreign member of the National Academy of Sciences in 2014. He has received honorary doctorates from the Otto von Guericke University of Magdeburg in 2002 and the University of Waterloo in 2006. He is the 2014 winner of the Erasmus Medal of the Academia Europaea. In 2025 he was awarded with the Saarland Order of Merit.

== Research ==
Mehlhorn is the author of several books and over 250 scientific publications, which include fundamental contributions to data structures, computational geometry, computer algebra, parallel computing, VLSI design, computational complexity, combinatorial optimization, and graph algorithms.

Mehlhorn has been an important figure in the development of algorithm engineering and is one of the developers of LEDA, the Library of Efficient Data types and Algorithms.

Mehlhorn has played an important role in the establishment of several research centres for computer science in Germany. He was the driving force behind the establishment of a Max Planck Institute for Computer Science in Germany, the Max Planck Institute for Computer Science (MPII). Mehlhorn was managing director of the institute and headed the department of algorithms and complexity. He was also a driving force in establishing the research center for computer science at Dagstuhl and an initiator of the European Symposium on Algorithms.

Mehlhorn has also contributed to the development of fair item allocation algorithms. In particular, he participated in proving the existence of envy-free up to any item allocations for three agents with additive valuations, which was considered an important open problem.

== Books ==
- Mehlhorn, Kurt (1977), Effiziente Algorithmen, Stuttgart: Teubner. Revised and translated as Data Structures and Algorithms, Springer-Verlag, 1984.
- Mehlhorn, Kurt (1984), Data Structures and Algorithms II: Graph Algorithms and NP-completeness, Springer-Verlag.
- Mehlhorn, Kurt (1984), Data Structures and Algorithms III: Multidimensional Searching and Computational Geometry, Springer-Verlag.
- Loeckx, Jacques; Mehlhorn, Kurt; Wilhelm, Reinhard (1988), Foundations of Programming Languages, J. Wiley, ISBN 978-0-471-92139-4.
- Mehlhorn, Kurt; Näher, Stefan (1999), LEDA: A Platform for Combinatorial and Geometric Computing, Cambridge University Press, ISBN 978-0-521-56329-1.
- Mehlhorn, Kurt; Sanders, Peter (2008), Algorithms and Data Structures: The Basic Toolbox, Springer, ISBN 978-3-540-77977-3.

== Selected publications ==
- Mehlhorn, Kurt; Schmidt, Erik M. (1982), "Las Vegas is better than determinism in VLSI and distributed computing" (PDF), Proc. 14th ACM Symp. Theory of Computing (STOC), pp. 330–337, doi:10.1145/800070.802208, ISBN 978-0-89791-070-5, S2CID 17932779.
- Mehlhorn, Kurt; Vishkin, Uzi (November 1984), "Randomized and deterministic simulations of PRAMs by parallel machines with restricted granularity of parallel memories" (PDF), Acta Informatica, 21 (4): 339–374, doi:10.1007/BF00264615, S2CID 29789494.
- Alt, Helmut; Mehlhorn, Kurt; Wagener, Hubert; Welzl, Emo (1988), "Congruence, similarity, and symmetries of geometric objects" (PDF), Discrete and Computational Geometry, 3 (1): 237–256, doi:10.1007/BF02187910, S2CID 5855400.
- Ahuja, Ravindra K.; Mehlhorn, Kurt; Orlin, James B.; Tarjan, Robert E. (April 1990), "Faster algorithms for the shortest path problem" (PDF), Journal of the Association for Computing Machinery, 37 (2): 213–223, doi:10.1145/77600.77615, hdl:1721.1/47994, S2CID 5499589.
- Dietzfelbinger, Martin; Karlin, Anna; Mehlhorn, Kurt; Meyer auf der Heide, Friedhelm; Rohnert, Hans; Tarjan, Robert E. (1994), "Dynamic perfect hashing: upper and lower bounds", SIAM Journal on Computing, 23 (4): 738–761, doi:10.1137/S0097539791194094. Also available as Princeton TR-310-91.
