= Maike Buchin =

German computer scientist

Maike Buchin is a German computer scientist specializing in computational geometry, and in particular on the analysis of similarities and clustering of geometric trajectory data. She is a professor at Ruhr University Bochum, and head of the chair in theoretical computer science there.

== Education and career ==
Buchin earned a diploma in mathematics from the University of Münster in 2003, and completed her Ph.D. in computer science from the Free University of Berlin in 2007. Her dissertation, On the Computability of the Fréchet Distance between Triangulated Surfaces, was supervised by Helmut Alt.

After postdoctoral research in the Netherlands at Utrecht University and the Eindhoven University of Technology, she became an assistant professor at Eindhoven in 2011, and moved to Ruhr University Bochum as a junior professor in 2013. She became full professor in 2019.
