= Peter Sanders (computer scientist) =

German computer scientist

Peter Sanders (born 1967) is a German computer scientist who works as a professor of computer science at the Karlsruhe Institute of Technology. His research concerns the design, analysis, and implementation of algorithms and data structures, and he is particularly known for his research on suffix sorting and finding shortest paths in road networks.

Sanders earned his Ph.D. from Karlsruhe in 1996, and worked for seven years at the Max Planck Institute for Informatics in Saarbrücken (completing his habilitation there in 2000) before returning to Karlsruhe as a professor in 2004.

Sanders was one of the winners of the Gottfried Wilhelm Leibniz Prize in 2012.

== Selected publications ==
Books

- Mehlhorn, Kurt; Sanders, Peter (2008). Algorithms and Data Structures: The Basic Toolbox. Springer. ISBN 978-3-540-77977-3. MR 2444537.

Research papers

- Sanders, Peter; Egner, Sebastian; Tolhuizen, Ludo (2003), "Polynomial Time Algorithms for Network Information Flow", Proceedings of the Fifteenth Annual ACM Symposium on Parallel Algorithms and Architectures (SPAA '03), New York, NY, USA: ACM, pp. 286–294, doi:10.1145/777412.777464, hdl:11858/00-001M-0000-0014-6B4A-B, ISBN 978-1-58113-661-6, S2CID 5507219.
- Jaggi, S.; Sanders, P.; Chou, P. A.; Effros, M.; Egner, S.; Jain, K.; Tolhuizen, L. M.G.M. (2005), "Polynomial Time Algorithms for Multicast Network Code Construction", IEEE Trans. Inf. Theory, 51 (6): 1973–1982, Bibcode:2005ITIT...51.1973J, doi:10.1109/TIT.2005.847712, S2CID 16817401.
- Kärkkäinen, Juha; Sanders, Peter; Burkhardt, Stefan (November 2006), "Linear Work Suffix Array Construction", Journal of the ACM, 53 (6): 918–936, doi:10.1145/1217856.1217858, S2CID 12825385.
- Geisberger, Robert; Sanders, Peter; Schultes, Dominik; Delling, Daniel (2008), "Contraction Hierarchies: Faster and Simpler Hierarchical Routing in Road Networks", Experimental Algorithms, Lecture Notes in Computer Science, vol. 5038, Berlin, Heidelberg: Springer-Verlag, pp. 319–333, doi:10.1007/978-3-540-68552-4_24, ISBN 978-3-540-68548-7, S2CID 777101.
