= Carl Friedrich Gauss Prize =

Mathematics award

- Description: Outstanding mathematical contributions that have found significant applications outside of mathematics
- Location: International (awarded at ICM)
- Presented by: International Mathematical Union (IMU) and the German Mathematical Society (DMV)
- Rewards: Medal and a cash prize (approx. €10,000)
- Status: Active
- Website: www.mathunion.org/prizes/carl-friedrich-gauss-prize

The Carl Friedrich Gauss Prize for Applications of Mathematics is a mathematics award, granted jointly by the International Mathematical Union and the German Mathematical Society for "outstanding mathematical contributions that have found significant applications outside of mathematics". The award receives its name from the German mathematician Carl Friedrich Gauss. With its premiere in 2006, it is to be awarded every fourth year, at the International Congress of Mathematicians.

The previous laureate was presented with a medal and a cash purse of EUR10,000 funded by the International Congress of Mathematicians 1998 budget surplus.

The official announcement of the prize took place on 30 April 2002, the 225th anniversary of the birth of Gauss. The prize was developed specifically to give recognition to mathematicians; while mathematicians influence the world outside of their field, their studies are often not recognized. The prize aims to honour those who have made contributions and effects in the fields of business, technology, or even day-to-day life.

== Laureates ==
| Award year | Winner | Reasons |
|---|---|---|
| 2006 | Kiyoshi Itô | "For laying the foundations of the theory of Stochastic Differential Equations and Stochastic Analysis." |
| 2010 | Yves Meyer | "For fundamental contributions to number theory, operator theory and harmonic analysis, and his pivotal role in the development of wavelets and multiresolution analysis." |
| 2014 | Stanley Osher | "For his influential contributions to several fields in applied mathematics and for his far-ranging inventions that have changed our conception of physical, perceptual, and mathematical concepts, giving us new tools to apprehend the world." |
| 2018 | David L. Donoho | "For his fundamental contributions to the mathematical, statistical and computational analysis of important problems in signal processing." |
| 2022 | Elliott H. Lieb | "For deep mathematical contributions of exceptional breadth which have shaped the fields of quantum mechanics, statistical mechanics, computational chemistry, and quantum information theory." |
| 2026 | Yurii Nesterov | "For his groundbreaking work on mathematical optimization that provided the theoretical foundation and algorithmic backbone for many numerical and data-driven fields, enabling practical computations that were previously too time-consuming to be feasible." |

== See also ==
- Fields Medal
- Chern Medal
- List of mathematics awards
