= Alexandra Silva =

Portuguese computer scientist

- Born: Alexandra Martins da Silva; February 1984 (age 42); Chaves, Portugal
- Education: University of Minho; Radboud University Nijmegen (PhD)
- Awards: Philip Leverhulme Prize (2016); Presburger Award (2017); Roger Needham Award (2018); Royal Society Wolfson Fellowship (2019)
- Scientific career
- Fields: Computer science Programming Languages; Semantics; F-Coalgebra; Formal methods
- Workplaces: Cornell University
- Thesis: Kleene coalgebra (2010)
- Doctoral advisor: Jan Rutten and Marcello Bonsangue
- Website: alexandrasilva.org

Alexandra Silva (born 1984) is a Portuguese computer scientist and Professor at Cornell University. She was previously Professor of Algebra, Semantics, and Computation at University College London.

== Awards and honours ==
Silva won a Philip Leverhulme Prize in engineering in 2016. She won the Presburger Award, awarded each year to "a young scientist for outstanding contributions in theoretical computer science, documented by a published paper or a series of published papers", in 2017, and the Roger Needham Award in 2018.
