= Elena Braverman =

Russian, Israeli, and Canadian mathematician

Elena Yanovna Braverman
- Елена Яновна Браверман
- Education: Perm State University, Ural State University
- Known for: Delay differential equations, difference equations, population dynamics
- Scientific career
- Fields: Mathematics
- Workplaces: University of Calgary
- Doctoral advisor: Nikolai V. Azbelev

Elena Yanovna Braverman (née Lumelskaya, Russian: Елена Яновна Браверман) is a Russian, Israeli, and Canadian mathematician known for her research in delay differential equations, difference equations, and population dynamics. She is a professor of mathematics and applied mathematics at the University of Calgary, and one of the editors-in-chief of the journal Advances in Difference Equations.

== Education and career ==
Braverman is originally from the Soviet Union, and earned bachelor's and master's degrees at Perm State University in 1981 and 1983 respectively. She defended her Ph.D. at Ural State University in 1990. Her dissertation, Linear impulsive functional differential equations, was supervised by Nikolai V. Azbelev.

In 1992, she emigrated to Israel, where she took a postdoctoral research position at the Technion – Israel Institute of Technology. She remained in Israel for most of the following decade, with teaching positions at the Technion and at the ORT Braude College of Engineering.

After visiting Yale University in 2001–2002, she moved to her present position at the University of Calgary in 2002. She was tenured there in 2007 and promoted to full professor in 2011.

== Book ==
Braverman is a co-author of the book Nonoscillation Theory of Functional Differential Equations with Applications (with Ravi P. Agarwal, Leonid Berezansky, and Alexander Domoshnitsky, Springer, 2012).

== Family ==
Braverman is the daughter of mathematical statistician Yan Petrovich Lumel'skii. Braverman's mother, Ludmila Mikhailovna Tsirulnikova, was also a university-level physics teacher, whose father was Soviet weapons engineer Mikhail Yuryevich Tsirulnikov. Braverman is the mother of theoretical computer scientist Mark Braverman.
