= Chern Medal =

International Congress of Mathematicians award

- Awarded for: Lifelong achievement in mathematics
- Country: Hosted every four years, at a varying location
- Presented by: International Mathematical Union (IMU)
- Reward: US$250,000
- First award: 2010
- Website: Official site

The Chern Medal is an international award recognizing outstanding lifelong achievement of the highest level in the field of mathematics. The prize is given at the International Congress of Mathematicians (ICM), which is held every four years.

== Introduction ==
Named in honor of the late Chinese mathematician Shiing-Shen Chern, the award is a joint effort of the International Mathematical Union (IMU) and the Chern Medal Foundation (CMF) to be bestowed in the same fashion as the IMU's other three awards (the Fields Medal, the Abacus Medal, and the Gauss Prize), i.e. at the opening ceremony of the International Congress of Mathematicians (ICM), which is held every four years. The first such occasion was at the 2010 ICM in Hyderabad, India.

Each recipient receives a medal decorated with Chern's likeness, a cash prize of $250,000 (USD), and the opportunity to direct $250,000 of charitable donations to one or more organizations for the purpose of supporting research, education, or outreach in mathematics.

== Laureates ==
Award year	Winner	Reasons
2010	Louis Nirenberg	"For his role in the formulation of the modern theory of non-linear elliptic partial differential equations and for mentoring numerous students and post-docs in this area."
2014	Phillip Griffiths	"For his groundbreaking and transformative development of transcendental methods in complex geometry, particularly his seminal work in Hodge theory and periods of algebraic varieties."
2018	Masaki Kashiwara	"For his outstanding and foundational contributions to algebraic analysis and representation theory sustained over a period of almost 50 years."
2022	Barry Mazur	"For his profound discoveries in topology, arithmetic geometry and number theory, and his leadership and generosity in forming the next generation of Mathematicians."
2026	Graeme Segal	"For his visionary mathematical insights that have had an enduring influence in a wide range of fields, including topology, mathematical physics, representation theory and category theory."

== See also ==
- Fields Medal
- Gauss Prize
- International Congress of Mathematicians (ICM)
- International Mathematical Union (IMU)
- Nevanlinna Prize
- List of mathematics awards
