= Susanne Albers =

German theoretical computer scientist

- Born: 10 June 1965 (age 61); Georgsmarienhütte, Germany
- Education: Saarland University
- Occupations: Computer scientist; university teacher
- Known for: Approximation and online algorithms
- Awards: Leibniz Prize
- Academic career
- Institutions: Technical University of Munich

Susanne Albers is a German theoretical computer scientist and professor of computer science at the Department of Informatics of the Technical University of Munich. She is a recipient of the Otto Hahn Medal and the Leibniz Prize.

== Education and career ==
Albers studied mathematics, computer science, and business administration in Osnabrück and received her PhD (Dr. rer. nat.) in 1993 at Saarland University under the supervision of Kurt Mehlhorn. Until 1999, she was associated with the Max Planck Institute for Computer Science and held visiting and postdoctoral positions at the International Computer Science Institute in Berkeley, Free University of Berlin, and University of Paderborn. In 1999, she received her habilitation and accepted a position at Dortmund University. From 2001 to 2009, she was professor of computer science at University of Freiburg. From 2009 to 2013, she has been at Humboldt University of Berlin.

Since 2013, Albers has held the Chair for Efficient Algorithms at the Department of Informatics of the Technical University of Munich.

== Research ==
Albers' research is in the design and analysis of algorithms, especially online algorithms, approximation algorithms, algorithmic game theory and algorithm engineering.

== Awards and honors ==
In 1993, she received the Otto Hahn Medal from the Max Planck Society, and in 2008 the Leibniz Prize from the German Research Foundation, considered the most important German research prize that includes a grant of €2.5 million. In 2011, she was elected as a fellow of the German Informatics Society. In 2014, she became one of ten inaugural fellows of the European Association for Theoretical Computer Science.
