= Lars Arge =

Danish computer scientist (1967–2020)

Lars Allan Arge (8 October 1967 – 23 December 2020) was a Danish computer scientist, the head of the Center for Massive Data Algorithmics (MADALGO) at Aarhus University, where he was also a professor of computer science. His research involved the study of algorithms and data structures for handling massive data, especially in graph algorithms and computational geometry.

== Education and career ==
Arge earned his Ph.D. in 1996 from Aarhus University, under the supervision of Erik Meineche Schmidt. He next did a postdoc at Duke University until 1998. He then became a professor at Duke University before returning to Aarhus as a professor in 2004. He continued to hold an adjunct professorship at Duke.

== Awards and honors ==
Arge was a member of the Royal Danish Academy of Sciences and Letters; he was elected to the presidium of the academy in 2015, and became secretary-general of the academy in 2016. In 2012, he was elected as a Fellow of the Association for Computing Machinery "for contributions to massive data algorithmics", becoming only the second ACM Fellow in Denmark. He also belonged to the Danish Academy of Technical Sciences.

In 2015, he became a Knight First Class in the Order of the Dannebrog.
