= Scott A. Smolka =

American computer scientist

Scott A. Smolka is a SUNY Distinguished Professor in the Department of Computer Science at Stony Brook University, Stony Brook, New York.

== Education and career ==
He obtained his Bachelor's and Master’s degrees in Mathematics from Boston University in 1975 and 1977, respectively, and his Ph.D. in computer science from Brown University, Providence, RI, in 1984. Before joining Stony Brook, Smolka was a Scientific Analyst at Aerospace Systems, Inc., Burlington, MA. Smolka's research spans the formal modeling and analysis of cyber-physical and biological systems, model checking, process algebra, and runtime verification. He is perhaps best known for the algorithm he and Paris Kanellakis developed for deciding Robin Milner's bisimulation. Smolka is a Fellow of the European Association for Theoretical Computer Science (EATCS).

In 2019 on his 65th birthday, a conference and festschrift was organised.

== Selected publications ==
- Bergstra, Jan A., Alban Ponse, and Scott A. Smolka, eds. Handbook of process algebra. Elsevier, 2001.
- Kanellakis, Paris C., and Scott A. Smolka. "CCS expressions, finite state processes, and three problems of equivalence." Information and computation 86, no. 1 (1990): 43–68.
- VanGlabbeek, Rob J., Scott A. Smolka, and Bernhard Steffen. "Reactive, generative, and stratified models of probabilistic processes." Information and Computation 121, no. 1 (1995): 59–80.
- Giacalone, Alessandro, Chi-Chang Jou, and Scott A. Smolka. "Algebraic reasoning for probabilistic concurrent systems." In Proc. IFIP TC2 Working Conference on Programming Concepts and Methods. 1990.
- Ramakrishna, Y. S., C. R. Ramakrishnan, I. V. Ramakrishnan, Scott A. Smolka, Terrance Swift, and David S. Warren. "Efficient model checking using tabled resolution." In International Conference on Computer Aided Verification, pp. 143–154. Springer, Berlin, Heidelberg, 1997.

== Awards and honors ==
- 2021 Dijkstra Award.
- Appointed SUNY Distinguished Professor, Nov. 2016.
- EATCS Fellow for “fundamental contributions in formal modeling and analysis”, since Feb. 2016.
- Name added to Stony Brook University’s Faculty Honor Wall, July 2017.
- Joint CONCUR-QEST-FORMATS 2016 Invited Speaker.
- 2008–2009 SUNY President/Chancellor’s Award for Excellence in Scholarship and Creative Activities.
