= International Congress of Mathematicians =

Quadrennial mathematics conference

- Status: Active
- Genre: Mathematics conference
- Frequency: Quadrennial
- Country: Varies
- Years active: 1897–present
- Inaugurated: 9 August 1897; 129 years ago
- Founders: Felix Klein; Georg Cantor
- Most recent: 6–14 July 2022
- Previous event: 2022
- Next event: 22–29 July 2026
- Major events: Active
- Website: mathunion.org/icm

The International Congress of Mathematicians (ICM) is the largest conference for the topic of mathematics. It meets once every four years, hosted by the International Mathematical Union (IMU).

The Fields Medals, the IMU Abacus Medal (known before 2022 as the Nevanlinna Prize), the Gauss Prize, the Leelavati Prize (since 2010) and the Chern Medal are awarded during the congress's opening ceremony. Each congress is memorialized by a printed set of Proceedings recording academic papers based on invited talks intended to be relevant to current topics of general interest. Being invited to talk at the ICM has been called "the equivalent ... of an induction to a hall of fame".

== History ==
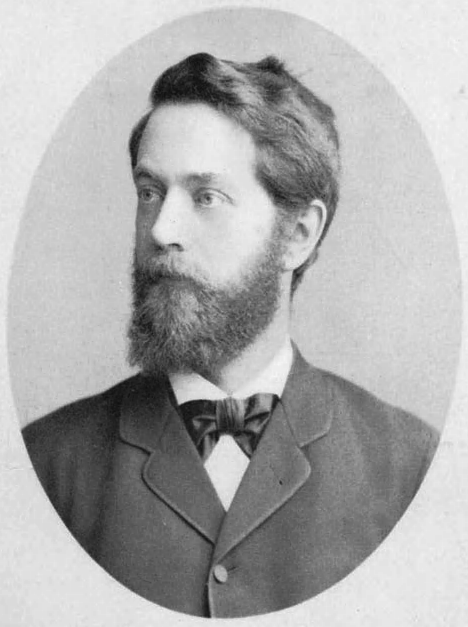
Felix Klein (1849–1925)

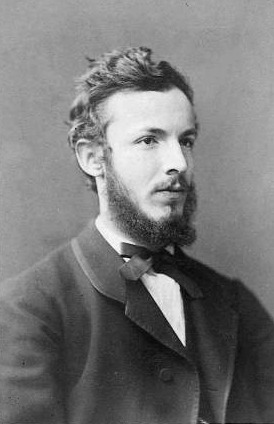
Georg Cantor (1845–1918)

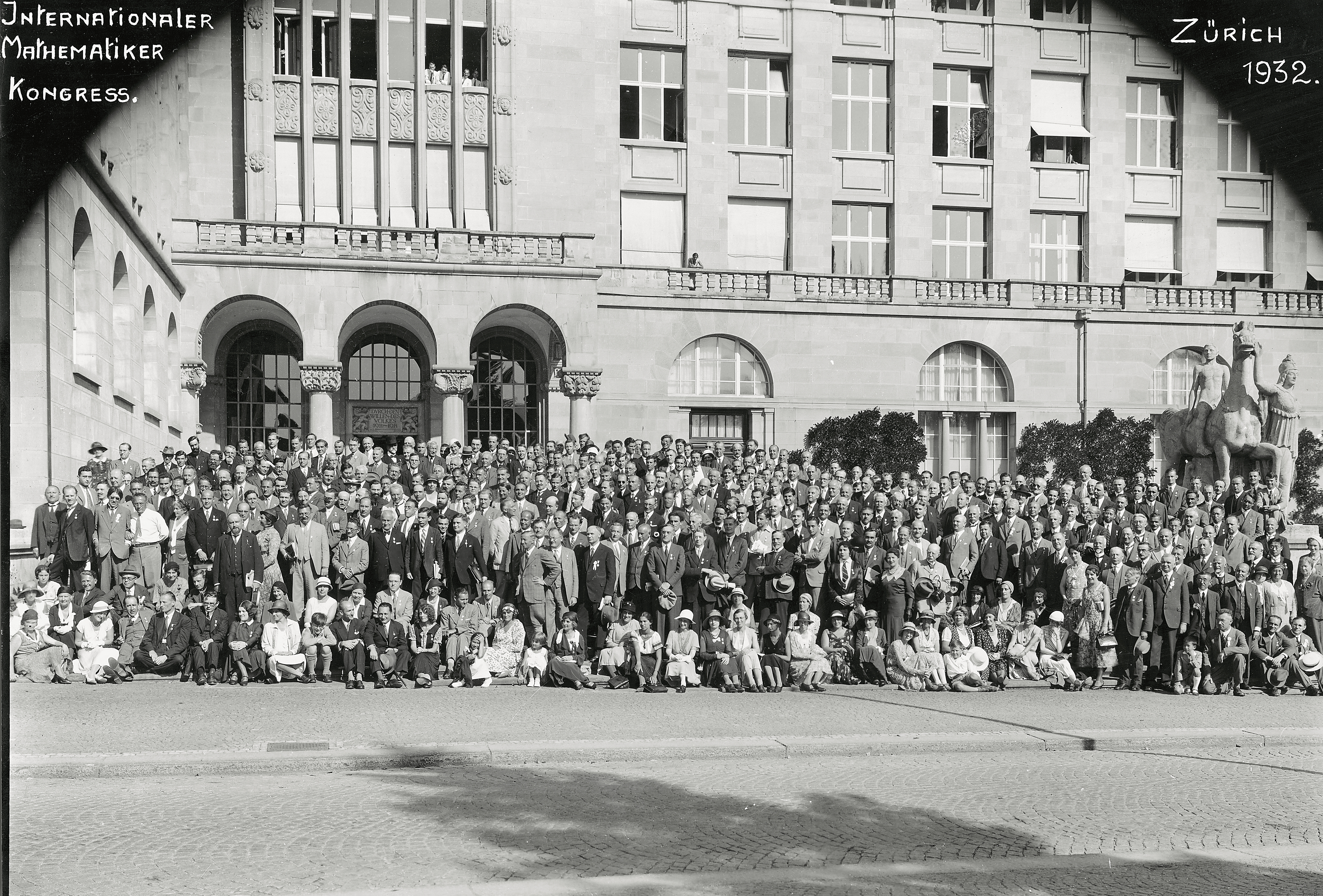
The 1932 International Congress of Mathematicians in Zürich, Switzerland

German mathematicians Felix Klein and Georg Cantor are credited with putting forward the idea of an international congress of mathematicians in the 1890s.

The University of Chicago, which had opened in 1892, organized an International Mathematical Congress at the Chicago World's Fair in 1893, where Felix Klein participated as the official German representative.

The first official International Congress of Mathematicians was held in Zürich in August 1897. The organizers included such prominent mathematicians as Luigi Cremona, Felix Klein, Gösta Mittag-Leffler, Andrey Markov, and others. The congress was attended by 208 mathematicians from 16 countries, including more than 100 from Switzerland or Germany, around 20 from each of France, Italy, and Austria-Hungary, 13 from the Russian Empire and 7 from the US. Only four were women: Iginia Massarini, Vera Schiff, Charlotte Scott, and Charlotte Wedell.

During the 1900 congress in Paris, France, David Hilbert announced his famous list of 23 unsolved mathematical problems, now termed Hilbert's problems. Moritz Cantor and Vito Volterra gave the two plenary lectures at the start of the congress.

At the 1904 ICM Gyula Kőnig delivered a lecture where he claimed that Georg Cantor's famous continuum hypothesis was false. An error in Kőnig's proof was discovered by Ernst Zermelo soon thereafter. Kőnig's announcement at the congress caused considerable uproar, and Klein had to personally explain to the Grand Duke of Baden (who was a financial sponsor of the congress) what could cause such an unrest among mathematicians.

During the 1912 congress in Cambridge, England, Edmund Landau listed four basic problems about prime numbers, now called Landau's problems. The first two Fields Medals were awarded at the 1936 ICM in Oslo.

In the aftermath of World War I, at the insistence of the Allied Powers, the 1920 ICM in Strasbourg and the 1924 ICM in Toronto excluded mathematicians from the countries formerly part of the Central Powers. This resulted in a still unresolved controversy as to whether to count the Strasbourg and Toronto congresses as true ICMs. At the opening of the 1932 ICM in Zürich, Hermann Weyl said: "We attend here to an extraordinary improbable event. For the number of n, corresponding to the just opened International Congress of Mathematicians, we have the inequality 7 ≤ n ≤ 9; unfortunately our axiomatic foundations are not sufficient to give a more precise statement”. As a consequence of this controversy, from the 1932 Zürich congress onward, the ICMs are not numbered.

For the 1950 ICM in Cambridge, Massachusetts, Laurent Schwartz, one of the Fields Medalists for that year, and Jacques Hadamard, both of whom were viewed by the U.S. authorities as communist sympathizers, were only able to obtain U.S. visas after the personal intervention of President Harry Truman.

The first woman to give an ICM plenary lecture, at the 1932 congress in Zürich, was Emmy Noether. The second ICM plenary talk by a woman was delivered 58 years later, at the 1990 ICM in Kyoto, by Karen Uhlenbeck.

The 1998 congress was attended by 3,346 participants. The American Mathematical Society reported that more than 4,500 participants attended the 2006 conference in Madrid, Spain. The King of Spain presided over the 2006 conference opening ceremony. The 2010 Congress took place in Hyderabad, India, on August 19–27, 2010. The ICM 2014 was held in Seoul, South Korea, on August 13–21, 2014. The 2018 Congress took place in Rio de Janeiro on August 1–9, 2018.

=== ICMs and the International Mathematical Union ===
The organizing committees of the early ICMs were formed in large part on an ad hoc basis and there was no single body continuously overseeing the ICMs. Following the end of World War I, the Allied Powers established in 1919 in Brussels the International Research Council (IRC). At the IRC's instructions, in 1920 the Union Mathematique Internationale (UMI) was created. This was the immediate predecessor of the current International Mathematical Union. Under the IRC's pressure, UMI reassigned the 1920 congress from Stockholm to Strasbourg and insisted on the rule which excluded from the congress mathematicians representing the former Central Powers. The exclusion rule, which also applied to the 1924 ICM, turned out to be quite unpopular among mathematicians from the U.S. and Great Britain. The 1924 ICM was originally scheduled to be held in New York, but had to be moved to Toronto after the American Mathematical Society withdrew its invitation to host the congress, in protest against the exclusion rule. As a result of the exclusion rule and the protests it generated, the 1920 and the 1924 ICMs were considerably smaller than the previous ones. In the run-up to the 1928 ICM in Bologna, IRC and UMI still insisted on applying the exclusion rule. In the face of the protests against the exclusion rule and the possibility of a boycott of the congress by the American Mathematical Society and the London Mathematical Society, the congress's organizers decided to hold the 1928 ICM under the auspices of the University of Bologna rather than of the UMI. The 1928 congress and all the subsequent congresses have been open for participation by mathematicians of all countries. The statutes of the UMI expired in 1931 and at the 1932 ICM in Zürich a decision to dissolve the UMI was made, largely in opposition to IRC's pressure on the UMI.

At the 1950 ICM the participants voted to reconstitute the International Mathematical Union (IMU), which was formally established in 1951. Starting with the 1954 congress in Amsterdam, the ICMs are held under the auspices of the IMU.

=== Soviet participation ===
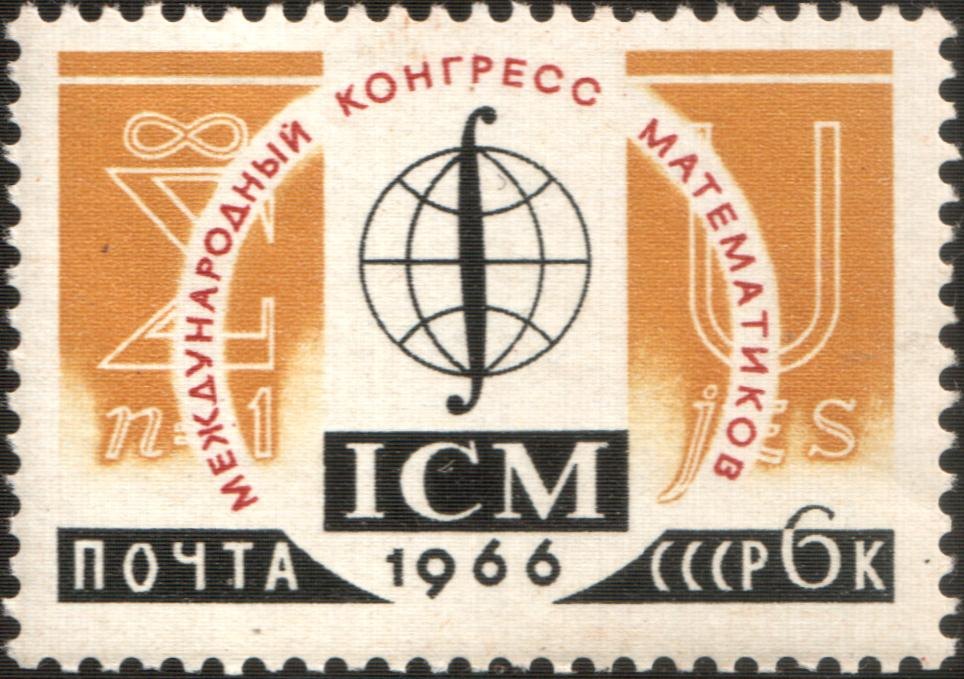
The Soviet commemorative stamp for the 1966 Congress in Moscow

The Soviet Union sent 27 participants to the 1928 ICM in Bologna and 10 participants to the 1932 ICM in Zürich. No Soviet mathematicians participated in the 1936 ICM, although a number of invitations were extended to them. At the 1950 ICM there were again no participants from the Soviet Union, although quite a few were invited. Similarly, no representatives of other Eastern Bloc countries, except for Yugoslavia, participated in the 1950 congress. Andrey Kolmogorov had been appointed to the Fields Medal selection committee for the 1950 congress, but did not participate in the committee's work. However, in a famous episode, a few days before the end of the 1950 ICM, the congress' organizers received a telegram from Sergei Vavilov, President of the USSR Academy of Sciences. The telegram thanked the organizers for inviting Soviet mathematicians but said that they are unable to attend "being very much occupied with their regular work", and wished success to the congress's participants. Vavilov's message was seen as a hopeful sign for the future ICMs and the situation improved further after Joseph Stalin's death in 1953. The Soviet Union was represented by five mathematicians at the 1954 ICM in Amsterdam, and several other Eastern Bloc countries sent their representatives as well. In 1957 the USSR joined the International Mathematical Union and the participation in subsequent ICMs by the Soviet and other Eastern Bloc scientists returned to more normal levels. However, even after 1957, tensions between ICM organizers and the Soviet side persisted. Soviet mathematicians invited to attend the ICMs routinely experienced difficulties with obtaining exit visas from the Soviet Union and were often unable to come. Thus of the 41 invited speakers from the USSR for the 1974 ICM in Vancouver, only 20 actually arrived. Grigory Margulis, who was awarded the Fields Medal at 1978 ICM in Helsinki, was not granted an exit visa and was unable to attend the 1978 congress. Another, related, point of contention was the jurisdiction over Fields Medals for Soviet mathematicians. After 1978 the Soviet Union put forward a demand that the USSR Academy of Sciences approve all Soviet candidates for the Fields Medal, before it was awarded to them. However, the IMU insisted that the decisions regarding invited speakers and Fields medalists be kept under exclusive jurisdiction of the ICM committees appointed for that purpose by the IMU.

== List of Congresses ==
Year	City	Country
2026	Philadelphia	United States
2022	Helsinki (Note: Online event: Originally planned to be in Saint Petersburg, Russia, but was moved online following the 2022 Russian invasion of Ukraine. The IMU General Assembly, ICM opening ceremony, and Fields medal lectures took place in Helsinki, Finland, in early July, 2022.)	Finland
2018	Rio de Janeiro	Brazil
2014	Seoul	South Korea
2010	Hyderabad	India
2006	Madrid	Spain
2002	Beijing	China
1998	Berlin	Germany
1994	Zürich	Switzerland
1990	Kyoto	Japan
1986	Berkeley	United States
1982	Warsaw (Note: Met during 1983)	Poland
1978	Helsinki	Finland
1974	Vancouver	Canada
1970	Nice	France
1966	Moscow	Soviet Union
1962	Stockholm	Sweden
1958	Edinburgh	United Kingdom
1954	Amsterdam	Netherlands
1950	Cambridge, Massachusetts	United States
1936	Oslo	Norway
1932	Zürich	Switzerland
1928	Bologna	Italy
1924	Toronto	Canada
1920	Strasbourg	France
1912	Cambridge	United Kingdom
1908	Rome	Italy
1904	Heidelberg	German Empire
1900	Paris	France
1897	Zürich	Switzerland

In 2026, it was announced that the 2030 congress would take place in Glasgow.

== See also ==
- List of International Congresses of Mathematicians Plenary and Invited Speakers
