= Theoretical Computer Science (journal) =

- Discipline: Computer science
- Language: English
- Edited by: Lila Kari, Seth Pettie, Vladimiro Sassone

Publication details
- History: 1975–present
- Publisher: Elsevier
- Impact factor: 1.0 (2024)

Standard abbreviations
- ISO 4: Theor. Comput. Sci.
- MathSciNet: Theoret. Comput. Sci.

Indexing
- ISSN: 0304-3975

Links
- Journal homepage; Online archive

Theoretical Computer Science is a peer-reviewed scientific journal covering computer science published by Elsevier. It was established in 1975. It is abstracted and indexed by Scopus and the Science Citation Index Expanded. According to the Journal Citation Reports, the journal has a 2024 impact factor of 1.0.
