= Alex Hall (author) =

American author (born 1990)

- Born: Alexander Hall; August 13, 1990 (age 36); Carmel, Indiana, U.S.
- Occupation: Writer
- Writing career
- Pen name: Jadusable
- Genres: Science fiction Young adult literature Horror fiction
- Notable work: Ben Drowned

Alexander D. Hall (born August 13, 1990), also known as Jadusable, is an American writer, showrunner, horror fiction novelist, and documentarian. He is known for creating and producing the web series Ben Drowned (2010–2020) and showrunning the subsequent alternate reality game. He was the host of the podcast The Digital Fireside and created several documentaries.

== Biography ==
Hall was born in Carmel, Indiana and began his career in the creative arts in 2008. He attended Saint Louis University until 2011.

In 2010 Hall wrote Ben Drowned – a story about an artificial intelligence named BEN that haunts a Nintendo 64 video game cartridge. Ben Drowned would go on to receive widespread critical acclaim and have a readership in the millions. The story became an example of a modern urban legend and a major influence in helping to legitimize creepypasta as a literary genre, and created many of the recognizable tropes that are now seen today in modern internet horror stories.

Hall later revealed that he had written another creepypasta under a pen name in an interview. There were attempts to adapt Ben Drowned into a Clive Barker and Warner Brothers series.

Hall created a series of gonzo-style documentaries and hosted a podcast interviewing Americans from eclectic walks of life. The most notable documentary piece from this time was covering Chris Cantelmo, a Yale-trained scientist purporting that dimethyltryptamine (DMT) cured his brain cancer.

In 2020 Hall created a sequel to Ben Drowned utilizing OpenAI to generate art and music assets for the story. Hall expressed enthusiasm for this emerging technology, citing that they could expand the possibilities available to independent creators, but urged caution that these tools could quickly render many artists/creators obsolete.

In 2023, Hall met with Senator Elizabeth Warren and other elected representatives on Capitol Hill to advocate for the wider adoption of blockchain technology in the United States and the development of a regulatory framework.

In a 2025 feature, the BBC revealed that Hall had begun developing a new series titled Dead Save, marking his return to his signature blend of horror fiction and digital storytelling. The project draws on game modding tools and collaboration with artists to reimagine urban myths and lost media legends from the sixth generation of video games.

== Works ==
- Normal (2008) – creator, writer, producer
- Ben Drowned (2010–2020) – creator, writer, producer
- The Digital Fireside (2019–2020)
- Dead Save (2025) - in development
