= Petscop =

2017 horror web series

- Fan recreation of Petscop's in-universe logo
- Genre: Horror; Creepypasta; Surrealism; Let's Play; Machinima; Analog horror
- Created by: Tony Domenico
- Original language: English
- No. of episodes: 24 (Note: 25, if one chooses to count the soundtrack, the final video uploaded as part of the series, which includes a brief epilogue.)

Production
- Running time: 2–44 minutes (Note: Due to a rare platform rendering bug, the durations shown for some episode thumbnails on YouTube may be inflated by up to 90 minutes. This article uses the canonical durations shown when watching Petscop episodes.)

Original release
- Network: YouTube
- Release: March 12, 2017 – September 2, 2019 (Note: Soundtrack video was posted on November 28, 2019.)

Petscop is a YouTube horror web series created by Tony Domenico, made to resemble a YouTube Let's Play series. The videos initially follow Paul exploring and documenting a supposedly "long-lost PlayStation video game" titled Petscop. The 24-episode series ran from March 12, 2017, to September 2, 2019. The series received widespread coverage for its storytelling, authenticity, surrealism, and its active community of viewers.

== Plot ==
level1
Song from the Petscop Soundtrack

The main character, Paul, has found or received a copy of the titular unreleased game Petscop, supposedly developed by the fictional company Garalina, uploading recordings of its early levels for a silent, unseen person he occasionally speaks with. Initially, the game seems like a standard yet unfinished PlayStation puzzle game, centering around the player character—named "Guardian"—capturing strange creatures known as "pets" by solving puzzles.

The game box, however, came attached with a note containing a code and instructions. By following these, Paul is able to access a hidden section of the game known as the "Newmaker Plane"; a vast, dark, grassy field with very few landmarks and a large network of underground tunnels. The area still loosely follows conventions of puzzle games, with Paul continuing to progress through the new area. As Paul finds more content, it is slowly revealed through references to 'real-world' events and characters that Petscop was designed for a specific person who did something horrible.

The series' overarching plot involves a man named Marvin who, after the disappearance of his childhood friend Lina, kidnaps his own daughter, Care, who he believes to be Lina reborn. There is a recurring focus on "rebirthing", a failed attempt to rebirth a girl named Belle into a girl named Tiara, and a growing connection between Paul, his family's past, and the game. It is later implied that some footage is not from Paul's perspective, introducing new viewpoints from Belle and Marvin, who are all playing Petscop simultaneously. Marvin solicits Paul's help to find landmarks on the Newmaker Plane, and re-enact the process of rebirthing his daughter, Care.

Later, Paul realizes that the landmarks on the Newmaker Plane may have significance to real-life locations; after presumably traveling to one of the real landmarks, Paul's voice is no longer present after this point, though videos continue to be uploaded without narration, with later videos often having the text "DEMO" at the top.

== Characters ==
=== Inside the game ===
- Guardian or Newmaker – The player character that Paul controls. It is a green animal-like creature of an unknown species.
- Red Tool – A large red object that the player can ask questions to, though it usually responds with "I don't know". It is found under the Newmaker Plane, in a room with a view of a windmill. Various other 'tools' in different colors are found across the series.
- Marvin – Marvin exists as a character in the game, and as a person mentioned in real life. Presumably, the real Marvin is playing the game as his avatar. Paul identifies him as the strange, green-faced creature in "Petscop 8". He is the father of Care, and kidnapped her in 1997 to perform rebirthing. Marvin appears occasionally to assist Paul, and they learn to communicate in an esoteric PlayStation controller language. In certain recordings, Marvin is seen playing sections of the game which specifically address him, implying the game was made for Marvin to find. Marvin later turns on Paul, and somehow hurts him physically in "Petscop 23".
- Carrie Mark (Care) – Care is depicted in the game and is mentioned to have existed in real life. She was abducted for a period in 1997 before returning—what happened in the interim is unknown, as is what happened afterwards. In the game, she is considered a "pet" and is caught under the Newmaker Plane. She exists in three different states: A (before her kidnapping), B (during her captivity) and NLM ("Nobody Loves Me", after escaping). A fourth state exists, depicted as a literal Easter egg, after her failed "rebirthing" attempt in "Petscop 23". She is depicted only as a static item.
- Michael Hammond (Mike) – A 7-year-old boy who lived from 1988 to 1995. His tombstone is found by Paul in the game, and he is later implied to be Rainer's brother, making him the cousin of Care. The circumstances of his death are unknown, but it is implied that Petscop was originally created to be his birthday gift.
- Lina Leskowitz – Carrie's aunt, who went missing as a girl in 1977—along with an entire windmill, which vanished behind her. Marvin saw this happen, and later believed that Lina was "reborn" into his daughter, Care. Lina is thanked for "making [the game] possible" and is referred to as "boss"; the series ends with Paul and Belle walking into her. It is repeatedly said that "not everyone" can see her.

=== Outside of the game ===
- Paul – Identified as such only due to naming his save file, Paul is quiet and investigative and is the voice heard and one playing the game during the initial episodes of Petscop. Nothing is definitively known about his connection to the family, other than his recognition of some events, and his desire to uncover the secrets of the game. There are several parallels between him and Care, implying a surrealistic connection between the two. Near the end of the series, there are several references to Paul being under some form of surveillance or being in captivity.
- Belle (also known as Tiara Leskowitz) – Throughout the series, Paul addresses a specific person, even in its first line: "This is just to prove to you that I'm not lying about this game I found." In "Petscop 22", Paul refers to this person as "Belle". A person named Tiara, first mentioned by the Tool and in a note in "Petscop 5", is depicted as an in-game character. Later in the series, the character insists her name is Tiara not Belle. In the series epilogue, Belle asks Paul if he remembers being "born"; when they were "smuggled away" by Lina, implying a family relationship.
- Rainer – Presumably a nickname for Care's cousin, Daniel Hammond. Rainer is or was the lead developer of Petscop, and his motives for creating the game are unclear. Some elements of the game are intended for Marvin to see, and to uncover the mystery of where he took Care. Rainer had somehow been in contact with Paul in his childhood and may have been the person to give him Petscop.
- Anna – The wife of Marvin and mother of Care.
- Jill – The owner of the channel and Care's aunt, apparently a suspicious figure according to Paul.

== Episodes ==
No.	Title	Time	Original release date
1	"Petscop"	9:07	March 12, 2017
2	"Petscop 2"	11:59	April 2, 2017
3	"Petscop 3"	11:38	April 3, 2017
4	"Petscop 4"	2:02	April 8, 2017
5	"Petscop 5"	7:37	April 12, 2017
6	"Petscop 6"	13:38	April 20, 2017
7	"Petscop 7"	9:52	April 30, 2017
8	"Petscop 8"	3:59	May 10, 2017
9	"Petscop 9"	15:11	May 24, 2017
10	"Petscop 10"	4:46	May 31, 2017
11	"Petscop 11"	29:31	December 25, 2017
12	"Petscop 12"	7:23	January 8, 2018
13	"Petscop 13"	7:06	March 12, 2018
14	"Petscop 14"	27:04	July 18, 2018
15	"Petscop 15"	6:16	July 19, 2018
16	"Petscop 16"	2:40	October 31, 2018
17	"Petscop 17"	13:00	April 21, 2019
18	"Petscop 18"	2:28	April 21, 2019
19	"Petscop 19"	7:44	April 21, 2019
20	"Petscop 20"	18:14	April 22, 2019
21	"Petscop 21"	3:09	April 22, 2019
22	"Petscop 22"	25:18	September 2, 2019
23	"Petscop 23"	20:18	September 2, 2019
24	"Petscop 24"	3:20	September 2, 2019
25	"Petscop Soundtrack"	44:44	November 28, 2019

== Reception and legacy ==
Petscop has received coverage from many news sources, such as The New Yorker and Kotaku: Kotaku's Patricia Hernandez wrote "if this is an internet story / game, then I am in awe of how elaborate it is", and for The New Yorker's Alex Barron, it is "the king of creepypasta". The Petscop YouTube channel, as of October 2026, has over 415,000 subscribers. Brooklyn's Spectacle Theater presented the first ever public screening of the series in its entirety on October 12, 2024.

=== Interpretations and cultural links ===
Petscop, as a video game, is fictional, although this was obscured for the entire run of the series. Some viewers were initially unsure as to whether "Paul" and Petscop were real, until further into the series when it became more surrealistic. Petscop was not officially identified as fiction until after the finale, when creator Tony Domenico—who had remained anonymous for the series' 30-month run—revealed himself on Twitter. In an interview, Domenico admitted that, while the story had a concrete plot, he chose to omit most of it, sometimes scrapping footage that was already done. "I hoped to get across a feeling like there's... something strange and complex happening in the background, and you just aren't getting a full view of it." In the darker sections of the game, there are many references to child abuse, childhood trauma, and irreparable corruption, making those recurring motifs throughout the series. In addition to these themes, Domenico has cited the Marble Hornets and Ben Drowned web series as influences, involving the audience by hiding things in each video. He also named the 2006 David Lynch experimental film Inland Empire as the strongest influence for the series and noted that "too much is lost in that translation into words". He also cited the musical subgenre vaporwave as an inspiration in an interview with Bandcamp.

The series' initial episodes also include allusions to Candace Newmaker and her death in rebirthing therapy. Throughout the series, the word "Newmaker" appears several times, both as the name of the location most of the series occurs within, and as a title given to Rainer, the Guardian character, and/or Paul himself. In addition, there is an area known as the "Quitter's Room", the repeated question "Do you remember being born?", and a character named Tiara. Domenico has stated that while the references were intentional, he later regretted them. Other references include a quote from the book Daisy-Head Mayzie by Dr. Seuss ("Good grief and alas"), and the imagery of the character Care crying underneath a large flower, which at first appears to be growing from her head.

== See also ==
- Analog horror
- Strange situation
- Nostalgia
