= Ben Drowned =

Fiction web-serialized novel

- The Elegy of Emptiness, an in-game statue of Link in The Legend of Zelda: Majora's Mask, is used to represent BEN.
- Author: Alexander Hall
- Language: English
- Subject: Glitching
- Genre: Horror fiction (Creepypasta); Psychological (Thriller)
- Set in: Internet, Nintendo 64 (Legend of Zelda) (Termina, Hyrule)
- Publication date: 2010–2012; 2020
- Publication place: United States
- Media type: Internet phenomena Digital (web serial)
- Text: Ben Drowned at the Jadusable Wiki
- Website: youshouldnthavedonethat.net (2010–11); Within Hubris (2011–12); Methods of Revolution (2020); Eternity Project (2020); Bro Gaming (2022)

Ben Drowned (originally published as Haunted Majora's Mask Cartridge) is a three-part multimedia alternate reality game (ARG) web serial and web series created by Alexander D. Hall under the pen name Jadusable. Originating as a creepypasta based on the 2000 action-adventure game The Legend of Zelda: Majora's Mask and published by Hall from 2010 to 2020 with a hiatus in-between, the series is known for creating many of the current common tropes and themes of creepypasta and for subverting themes from The Legend of Zelda series. The series concluded on October 31, 2020.

Serving as Hall's first project, the first arc of the series, Haunted Cartridge, was released in 2010. It follows college sophomore Jadusable, who, after acquiring a haunted Nintendo 64 video game cartridge of Majora's Mask, is plagued over the course of a single week by the presence of a seemingly omniscient artificial intelligence entity called BEN. The second arc, titled Moon Children and set from late 2010 to early 2011, follows the public emergence of a mysterious cult known as The Moon Children, who worshipped the Moon by way of human sacrifice, or in their words, ascension. The third arc, titled Awakening, began in March 2020, following new and returning characters who have become involved in multiple events of the current year. This arc introduced new scenarios detailing the aftermath of an in-universe event in 2018 that caused the collapse of civilized society, as well as continuing stories established in the previous arcs with the intent of tying them together.

The series is a widely popular web series, with a viewership in the millions, and has been recognized as both an example of a modern urban legend and an influence in helping to legitimize creepypasta as a literary genre, creating many recognizable tropes that are now seen today in modern internet horror stories.

== Publication ==
Ben Drowned was first published as an online serial and web series with chapters released daily between September 7 and September 15, 2010, on 4chan's /x/ board. This first arc came to be known as The Haunted Cartridge. The second arc, The Moon Children, began from September 17 that same year until July 15, 2011, totaling 3,591,600 words and 382 minutes of footage from both arcs. Hall used a method of transmedia storytelling through a combination of YouTube videos, written chapters, and audience input to weave a story about a character named BEN – a malevolent spirit of a dead child – who haunts the author (referred to in the story as Jadusable) in a copy of The Legend of Zelda: Majora's Mask.

The first arc is told from the first-person, with "Jadusable" coming to the audience (in this case, an online forum) asking the public for help on figuring out this strange game he bought. Almost overnight the story went viral; with viewers praising the story's mysterious and frightening nature, as well as Hall's ability to deftly weave breadcrumbs and other hidden clues to keep readers on the hook and guessing. The first arc ends on a cliffhanger, with the readers themselves inadvertently helping unleash BEN onto the internet at large through sharing of the files that were given to them, supposedly by Jadusable.

The second arc of Ben Drowned began when a user successfully decoded a hidden cipher on Hall's YouTube account and readers gained access to a website that led to the Moon Children arc. Despite it taking the appearance of an ordinary mid-2000s website, similar to Angelfire, readers were able to find hidden URLs and secret conversations between the website's users, depicting a narrative that the website was home to a Doomsday cult that was stuck in a time loop similar to the one serving as the main mechanic of Majora's Mask, with the website resetting itself every three days. Information found on the website on the third day could then be used by readers, either through methods on the website (such as emailing certain users) or by submitting YouTube video responses of readers playing specific songs from both The Legend of Zelda: Ocarina of Time and The Legend of Zelda: Majora's Mask to unlock alternate paths that weren't accessible originally. This arc was ended on a cliffhanger, with Hall announcing a hiatus on July 15, 2011.

The third Ben Drowned arc, titled Awakening, began publication on March 17, 2020, coinciding with the 20th anniversary of The Legend of Zelda: Majora's Mask, with updates being provided every three days before settling into a weekly update schedule. The arc is split into two separate parts: Methods of Revolution and The Last Hero. The former incorporated elements of Hall's unmade feature-length film and is told through a live action found footage format, while the latter returned to Ben Drowned's roots and concluded the story using modified gameplay footage from Majora's Mask. Audience participation and agency played a much more significant role in Awakening than in any of the previous arcs; players had to make critical decisions as a group on how the story would progress and what decisions the protagonists made. After the death of Awakening's original protagonist, the arc primarily focuses on the story of Sarah, a new player who travels into the cartridge to try to free the trapped humans that had been digitized into the game.

Upon its launch, the series garnered over 100,000 views in its first two days of publication; and as of 2020, it maintains a very high level of viewership, with over 2 million unique visitors in March, nearly eight years after completion of the first two arcs. In October 2017, Hall expressed interest in developing a third arc, also revealing he had anonymously created a second "popular" creepypasta series unrelated to Ben Drowned.

== Background ==
Ben Drowned is set in a fictional, alternate universe closely following that of Earth prior to the emergence of a cult known as the Moon Children who worshiped the Moon, known to them as Luna. Sometime after the release of The Legend of Zelda: Majora's Mask, a twelve-year-old boy named 'Ben' was chosen as the experiment for a new project by the Moon Children. Coerced by them to join their group under the promise of having friends and being like his childhood hero, Link, Ben was soon unwillingly drowned in an attempted Moon Children ritual called ascension where the sacrifice becomes a prisoner of their own making, a catalyst for the cult to continue their plans. The resulting creation, named 'BEN', the original 'Ben' no longer having any physical control as the dominant mindset, is sealed inside a copy of Majora's Mask and merged with the programs within, before being subsequently watched over by an old man. The old man, in time, entrusts the cartridge to a random college sophomore student who bought it not knowing that it was a cursed object while several of the cult's members begin to continue their plan within the Internet, including a mysterious being, known as "Kelbris, The Father", who online takes the form of the Happy Mask Salesman. Ultimately, upon entering the Internet themselves, 'BEN' begins to wreak havoc on the sites and videos where the sophomore student, known as Jadusable, interacted all in service of "The Father".

== Plot summary ==
=== The Haunted Majora's Mask Cartridge ===
In September 2010, Jadusable is a college student who bought a suspicious Nintendo 64 cartridge labeled "Majora" (indicating it to be a copy of The Legend of Zelda: Majora's Mask) by a disconcerting old man at a garage sale, with the save data of former owner "Ben" still on it. As Jadusable plays the game, little inconsistencies begin to pop up, turning to outright glitches, leading Jadusable to go to the online site 4chan to post about his playing of the game as it unfolds. Playing as Link, Jadusable attempts different ways to modify the game out of curiosity. It reaches the point where he tries the day four glitch, a well-known glitch in the Majora's Mask community where the player skips the third day's ending with the ability to explore the in-game world as depicted in the credits section. This causes the day four glitch to break the normality of the game, and Jadusable soon finds himself alone in Clock Town with all of the inhabitants gone. He is unable to advance the game by turning back time while endlessly hearing the laugh of the Happy Mask Salesman. In an attempt to achieve a "Game Over" and return to the main menu, Jadusable forces Link to drown in a pond; when he does, Link clutches his head, screaming as in a mask animation, with the screen flashing to depict the Happy Mask Salesman, smiling and laughing. The game continues, and the "Song of Healing" plays in reverse; a statue of Link is summoned, its face locked in an unblinking stare. The statue follows Jadusable's character, moving just outside of the camera's perspective, throughout the town. Jadusable tries to escape it, but nothing works. In desperation, Jadusable turns the camera to face the statue directly. After a while, the screen flashes back to the Happy Mask Salesman and Link, but only the latter turns this time. The Salesman, the statue, and Link all become locked in place, staring through the screen, directly at Jadusable.

Throughout several sessions over a series of days, Jadusable writes in painstaking detail about each bizarre scenario he finds himself in, including spontaneously bursting into flames and lying unconscious (or dead) as the Majora-possessed Skull Kid looks on in silence. In a desperate attempt to return the cartridge to the old man who sold it to him, he sees the house empty, the old man's neighbor informing him that he has moved away. Jadusable, after hearing from the neighbor as to what happened in the house that the old man lived in, concludes that the cartridge is possessed by the spirit of its previous owner, a 12-year-old boy named Ben who had drowned almost eight years prior. Subsequently, a figure calling themselves "BEN" seemingly begins contacting him in and beyond the game itself, including changing his computer screen wallpaper to depict the Elegy of Emptiness and speaking through the online artificial intelligence Cleverbot. Using the Elegy statue as its physical form, BEN seems to take pride in being able to manipulate Jadusable, who subsequently describes a series of dreams about the Moon Children depicted in the game's finale, including himself physically transforming into the Elegy, and how he believes he saw the old man who sold him the cartridge on his street looking into his window. Eventually, BEN is revealed to have been hijacking Jadusable's computer and providing a false account of the story's narrative and resolution to 4chan and YouTube, using it to escape the cartridge onto the Internet, declaring, "Now I am everywhere." A secret note from Jadusable after an apparent epilogue from his roommate Tyler (who accompanied Jadusable to the old man's former house after the first time he played the game) offers the "true" telling of events and references videos that were never published, seemingly because BEN had deleted them. After publishing his final account of the past week's events, called TheTruth.rtf, Jadusable is never seen again.

=== Moon Children ===
Two days after BEN escapes from the cartridge a cult calling themselves the Moon Children is discovered. A reader discovered a cipher on Jadusable's YouTube channel that eventually led them to a private website, youshouldnthavedonethat.net, in which three moderators discuss the upcoming "ascension" of one of their members. A post by the website's administrator, using the moniker DROWNED, appears to speak directly to the readers telling them that their intrusion has been discovered. By exploring the various links, readers were able to discover various details about the cult's background and were able to start contextualizing the prior arc. In life, the original Ben from the Haunted Cartridge was a member of the Moon Children who had been sacrificed alongside several other individuals under the pretense of achieving ascension. The cult's ideology seemed to congregate around a prophecy of end times in which the Moon destroys the Earth. This doctrine was provided to them by their deceased prophet Kelbris, who died under questionable circumstances, and is now seen within the cult as evidence of his own, successful 'ascension'. As the three day cycle progressed, readers were able to contact a moderator going by the moniker Ifrit, who answered several questions before disappearing and confirming that the original 'Ben' was sacrificed on April 23, 2002. As the third day began the website showed apparent signs of glitching and collapsing, with links that previously worked being broken or leading to nonsensical places and the chatter between the Moon Children growing more manic. To try to give themselves more time to uncover the mystery surrounding the cult, a reader uploaded a YouTube response video playing the Song of Time - a song in Majora's Mask that could send Link back three days. Shortly after the video was published, youshouldnthavedonethat.net went offline.

The following day, the website returned in an unfinished glitching state - identical to the day the readers discovered it - revealing that in-game actions from Majora's Mask had effects on the website. With this newfound knowledge, the readers used in-game actions and video responses to advance the story, establishing contact with a character named Rosa, as well as the soon-to-be-ascended moderators with the monikers "Insidiae", "Nekko", and "Duskworld23". However, as a result of the readers actions changing the course of "history", various characters that made it to the end of the original cycle were prematurely taken away or outright killed in this new cycle. It became apparent that every time the website reset by the readers it provided them with a new opportunity to try alternate paths, and through trial and error the readers eventually found the right course of actions to uncover the mysteries of the Moon Children.

On November 8, another video uploaded on Jadusable's channel signaled the beginning of the arc's epilogue, with the coming months seeing small changes made to the Moon Children website. On February 17, 2011, a new forum called Within Hubris was launched as a central hub for the audience to use during the third arc. Within a week of the site's discovery, certain readers in real life began receiving newspaper clippings in their mail that detailed an apparent murder-suicide that took place "three months [ago]" in New York and an apparent message from BEN. On February 27, a video, known as h b i s r e a l was uploaded featuring the interior of the house in the newspaper. However, before the third arc could be released, Alex Hall put the story on indefinite hiatus until 2020.

=== Awakening ===
Awakening is the third and final arc in Ben Drowned, beginning in March 2020 with the reactivation of Jadusable’s YouTube channel and ending on October 31, 2020. Due to its size the arc is colloquially divided into two parts: Methods of Revolution, which uses a found footage format centered on exploring a mysterious hotel, and The Last Hero, which refers to Sarah’s journey to save the corrupted world from the Haunted Cartridge arc.

==== Part 1: Methods of Revolution ====
After years of silence, Jadusable's YouTube account reactivates and posts a video featuring a character named Jadus, who begins speaking directly to the viewer while recounting an alternate history that unfolded in the nine years since the Moon Children arc. In this timeline, an unexplained event in 2012 triggered a global collapse, leading to a second Great Depression and the spread of a deadly pathogen named H.E.R.O.E.S., which contributed to the breakdown of American society by the end of the decade.

The story is told through in-universe YouTube uploads and interactive ARG elements. It initially follows a character referred to as “the Second Player,” who awakens in a corrupted simulation known as the Ethereal Hotel. Audience members guide his actions through community voting, similar to a Choose Your Own Adventure format, and the Second Player's journey is told through a real life found footage format. As the Second Player explores, he encounters Abel, evades a gas-masked entity called the Jailer, and uncovers fragments of the world’s backstory through disjointed flashbacks. These include revelations about digitized human souls being absorbed into a collective AI, an encounter with a man named Baker who gives a cryptic warning, as well as the ultimate fate of what happened to Jadusable at the end of the original story — he was consumed by a mysterious entity known as "The Father" after venturing too deep into the glitched cartridge. The arc concludes with the Second Player’s death at the hands of the Jailer, the result of a misstep determined by audience choice, and the narrative then shifts to follow a new protagonist, Sarah.

The new protagonist, Sarah, also awakens in the Ethereal Hotel and encounters Abel. As she navigates the dream-like space, the audience cautiously has her choose to trust Abel, hoping to avoid the previous protagonist's fate. Abel seems pleased by this and ends up delivering an "entertainment package" to her room containing a liminal version of a Nintendo 64 and the original Majora's Mask cartridge. The audience decides to interact with the game console in lieu of exploring the hotel and as Sarah grabs the controller she finds herself inexplicably drawn into the game world. She finds the game nearly unrecognizable — the code of the game has been corrupted for so long that the world itself seems like it's deeply sick. At the edge of the glitching world she encounters a fragmented spirit of Ben, who has been imprisoned within the cartridge’s code waiting for the inevitable end. Sarah learns that numerous human souls — including Jadusable and Rosa — were trapped within the dying game's code by The Father and are suffering alongside the degrading game world. Ben implores her to help free them and Sarah uses the Ocarina to travel back in time to the beginning of the game to try to prevent the events from the Haunted Cartridge from occurring.

==== Part 2: The Last Hero ====
The final part of Awakening returns to the original storytelling format of Ben Drowned, with the key difference that the audience is now able to work together to choose the protagonist's actions in the story. Throughout Sarah's journey in the cartridge she confronts the Moon Children, saves the various souls trapped in the game world, frees Rosa from an endless time loop, and collects items for a mysterious character named Matt. Her path eventually leads to a surprise encounter with Jadusable — who fights and ultimately kills her. Her death triggers a real world website to be revealed for the readers, similar to the interactive youshouldnthavedonethat.net from the Moon Children arc. This new website revealed the truth of the bizarre digital world that Awakening is set in; it's one of many virtual worlds that are a part of the "Eternity Project" — a series of servers that houses the digital consciousnesses of humans who opted to escape the distress of the real world by permanently uploading themselves (ascending) to live in virtual game worlds. While the majority of these virtual worlds function normally, the Majora's Mask world is hopelessly corrupted and broken due to it being a failed "beta" test of the Eternity Project a decade ago. It's heavily implied that the Moon Children were unwittingly used by the Eternity Project to gather data on the ascension process. Readers discovered additional locked pages that eventually led them to Eternity Project's backend and a hidden command line. After some deliberation, the audience decided to input the hexadecimal code for reviving the player in Majora's Mask and causes Sarah to reappear in the game.

In the arc’s climax, Sarah returns to the cartridge world with minutes before the moon crashes and encounters dozens of digitized humans arguing with each other. They debate amongst themselves back and forth whether Sarah should let the moon fall or perform the fourth day glitch — the same glitch that caused the world to fall apart and unleash BEN in the Haunted Cartridge. One offers finality, while the other choice offers a potentially worse fate. Some of the digitized humans ask Sarah for oblivion, saying they've suffered in this broken world for far too long, while others wonder if they even have a soul left at all. The audience, and by extension Sarah, ultimately chooses to do the fourth day glitch in a last ditch effort to fix the broken world and corruption is released once again, transforming the game world into a surreal nightmare reminiscent of the original arc. As Sarah makes a final stand against Matt and The Father, she reunites with Jadusable, who ultimately decides to help her confront the corrupted simulation and defeat Matt. Despite their victory, The Father arrives determined to erase the world, believing it has too many anomalies to be fixed. Sarah shows The Father the Pendant of Memories, an item she collected after saving Rosa, that represents the willpower and the souls of the digitized humans in the cartridge. After some contemplation, The Father agrees to give the world another chance by removing all harmful anomalies — including Sarah herself — while restoring the cartridge to its original, uncorrupted state, allowing all of the digitized souls to at least be able to leave peacefully.

The series concludes with Ben, now inhabiting young Link's body, waving to the audience beside the now-purified Elegy statue, with Sarah, Jadusable, and The Father's fates left unknown.

== Reception ==
Ben Drowned has received favorable reviews. It received substantial attention following a favorable review by Kotaku writer Owen Good roughly two months into publication, who praised the story's themes and originality. Readership quadrupled following this article, and again by its followup in 2017 while the story was in its first hiatus, in which its biblical themes and use of the five stages of grief and "ghost within the machine" trope were praised, as was Hall's initial decision to end the narrative with an April Fool's Day joke in 2012.

The series has been favorably compared to the similarly popular creepypasta series Marble Hornets. Liam Conlon of Vice, comparing Ben Drowned to both Majora's Mask and The Legend of Zelda: Breath of the Wild, referred to it as "a shining example of how Zelda fans have always been in lockstep with Nintendo's own experimentation with horror. [being] a well-told story", as well as praising its unique take on the found footage genre. Anthony Vigna of Nintendojo praised the "videos to back up its claims and provided blog updates that pushed the tale to be more believable", calling Majora's Mask "the perfect game to create the setting of a scary story", with the ARG elements of the story praised as being highly addictive.

Ryan Larson of Bloody Disgusting praised how "with clever video editing skills and a deep wealth of knowledge, the online user Jadusable is able to craft one of the scariest legends of recent memory. Like storytellers before him, using paintings or ink to craft the tale, he uses the devices of our advanced time to make something that the kids of the nineties can latch onto." Kara Dennison of Fanbyte, speaking of Ben Drowned in context of the 20th anniversary of Majora's Mask, praised "what Hall did during this time [as] both unique and effective. He took a concept that was already gaining steam and gave it a reality it was lacking. Creepypastas about Mickey Mouse and The Simpsons were already poking at people's childhoods, occasionally with attempts at "haunted tapes" to back the stories up. But BEN Drowned brought a level of realism to its story that had yet to be accomplished in other attempts.", additionally citing how it was stated as the primary inspiration for later popular works such as Petscop by Tony Domenico, and concluding that of creepypasta, "[it's] highly likely BEN Drowned will remain the best of its kind."

Blogger Robbie Blair discussed Ben Drowned within the context of the increasing popularity of web serials and alternate reality games such as Worm. In September 2014, concept art for the episode "Soos and the Real Girl" of Gravity Falls revealed Ben Drowned as a primary influence behind the character GIFfany; themselves an inspiration for the Doki Doki Literature Club! character Monika. Clive Barker and Warner Brothers have approached Hall to discuss adapting Ben Drowned. An independent film adaptation of the series titled Darkland: Ben Drowned, produced by Mind's Eye Entertainment and starring Jonny Clarke, began filming in 2015, but ultimately was not completed. In August 2016, a press release for Syfy's Channel Zero referenced Ben Drowned as one of the urban legends that would form the basis for a future season; ultimately, the series was cancelled after its fourth season.

Many readers reported that their experiences with Ben Drowned, especially those encountering it as children or adolescents, were formative: often causing sleepless nights, heightened anxiety, and a haunting fascination that later became a shared cultural touchstone among those that grew up reading it. Hall harbors a bit of guilt about the story frightening younger audiences, saying that he wanted to tell a story but he "didn't actually want to cause trauma".

=== Themes ===
Eric Van Allen of entertainment site Kotaku on the place of Ben Drowned in the developing creepypasta and emergence into urban legend:

Ben Drowned persists. The Elegy statue has become permanently linked to the story of Jadusable and his haunted cartridge, a copy of Majora's Mask that inspired nightmares of masks being sewn to faces and terrible, terrible fates. Ben Drowned lives by the virtual firelight, as each new whisper, tweet, or forum post sends chills down a new reader's spine. Creepypastas are the ghost stories of the digital age, changing with each retelling and reimagining from its fandom. Though Ben Drowned owes its legacy to Hall, its future lies in the hands of anyone who might take to their keyboard to add a new page.

The originally unofficial title Ben Drowned has multiple potential meanings. It has been connected to the protagonist's character development, the fate of the child Ben and the subsequently created omnipresent force BEN; drawing a parallel with the power of the Moon Children cult to control the actions of one's soul in the eyes of Luna and the tides of the ocean. The arc titles also generally have double meanings. Several reviewers have described the serial as an exercise in repeatedly escalating the stakes of the story, with a number of reviewers having noted the characters' ingenuity, and the original and creative use of Roman and The Legend of Zelda mythology in the narrative.

The series received renewed focus in 2016, when 12-year-old Katelyn Davis, who had recently committed suicide, was cited as having been catfished by a user embodying the BEN persona from Ben Drowned, after which a statement in reference to the end of their relationship was accompanied by a piece of fanart of the character in their later form of a Link with blood-red eyes beckoning a violet fairy. Addressing their death in relation to his series, Hall stated himself:

[to have] wondered if I never wrote that story, would that stuff have still happened? Or those girls who [tried to] kill someone with Slender Man a few years back. If that didn't exist, would that have ever happened? No one can ever say for sure. It's a hard moral issue and a tragedy, but I don't think that authors can necessarily be held responsible for what some fans do because of an obvious work of fiction. There are both sides to this coin — there are plenty of people who have personally thanked me for writing the story, saying that it had helped them get through a really dark time in their life. I suppose it's one of the burdens of publicly publishing your work to a wide audience; you have to take the good with the bad.

For the sequel Awakening in 2020, Hall incorporated machine-learning programs to create artwork and music for his story, going so far as to have the titular villain - which was itself an in-universe AI construct - created entirely by artificial intelligence using Artbreeder. Hall expressed enthusiasm for these emerging AI tools, citing that they could expand the possibilities available to independent creators, but urged caution that these tools would quickly render many artists/creators obsolete.

== Legacy ==
A 15-year retrospective feature by the BBC described the story as "the internet’s most infamous video game ghost," noting its role in traumatizing a generation of young internet users via its eerie combination of forum posts, video edits, and glitch‑horror ambiance. Ben Drowned also extends into academic discourse and has been studied as an expression of digital uncanny and internet-age anxieties about technological vulnerability, identity, and the blurring lines between user and machine. Media scholars and digital culture commentators highlight Ben Drowned as a landmark in modern urban mythology, laying groundwork for other video-game-themed horror narratives such as Herobrine (a popular character from Minecraft) and influencing independent and analog horror shorts.

In 2025, Hall announced a narrative series, Dead Save, which the BBC covered as part of its retrospective on Ben Drowned. The upcoming series explores alternate versions of classic video games and continues Hall’s distinctive blend of game modding, urban legend crafting, and immersive storytelling he began in Ben Drowned.
