= Artbreeder =

Machine-learning based art website

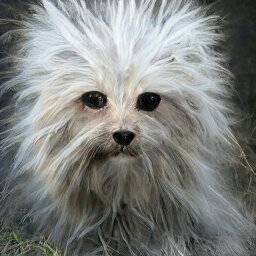
- The logo for the 'General' category
- Website type: Content creation
- Available in: English
- Country of origin: United States
- Creator: Joel Simon
- Website: artbreeder.com
- Commercial: No
- Launched: 2018
- Current status: Active
- Content license: CC0

Artbreeder, formerly known as Ganbreeder, is a collaborative, machine learning-based art website. Using the models StyleGAN and BigGAN, the website allows users to generate and modify images of faces, landscapes, and paintings, among other categories.

== Overview ==
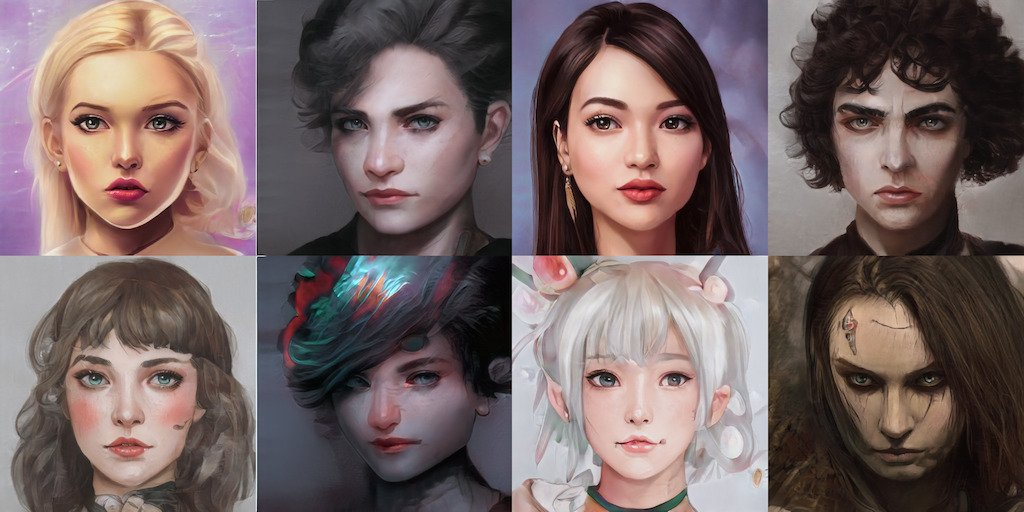
An example of portraits in Artbreeder

On Artbreeder, users mainly interact through the remixing - referred to as 'breeding' - of other users' images found in the publicly accessible database of images. The creation of new variations can be done by tweaking sliders on an image's page, known as "genes", which in the "Portraits" model can range from color balance to gender, facial hair, and glasses. Additionally, any image can be "crossbred" with other publicly viewable images from the database, using a slider to control how much of each image should influence the resulting "child".

The site also allows for uploading new images, which the model will attempt to convert into the latent space of the network.

== Notable usages ==
The similarly AI-driven text adventure game AI Dungeon uses Artbreeder to generate profile pictures for its users, and The Static Age's Andrew Paley has used Artbreeder to create the visuals for his music videos. Artbreeder has been used to create portraits of characters from popular novels such as Harry Potter and Twilight. They have also been used to add realistic features to ancient portraits.

Artbreeder was used to create characters in the sequel to Ben Drowned with the titular villain, an AI-construct itself, created entirely using the website.

== Changes to Artbreeder ==
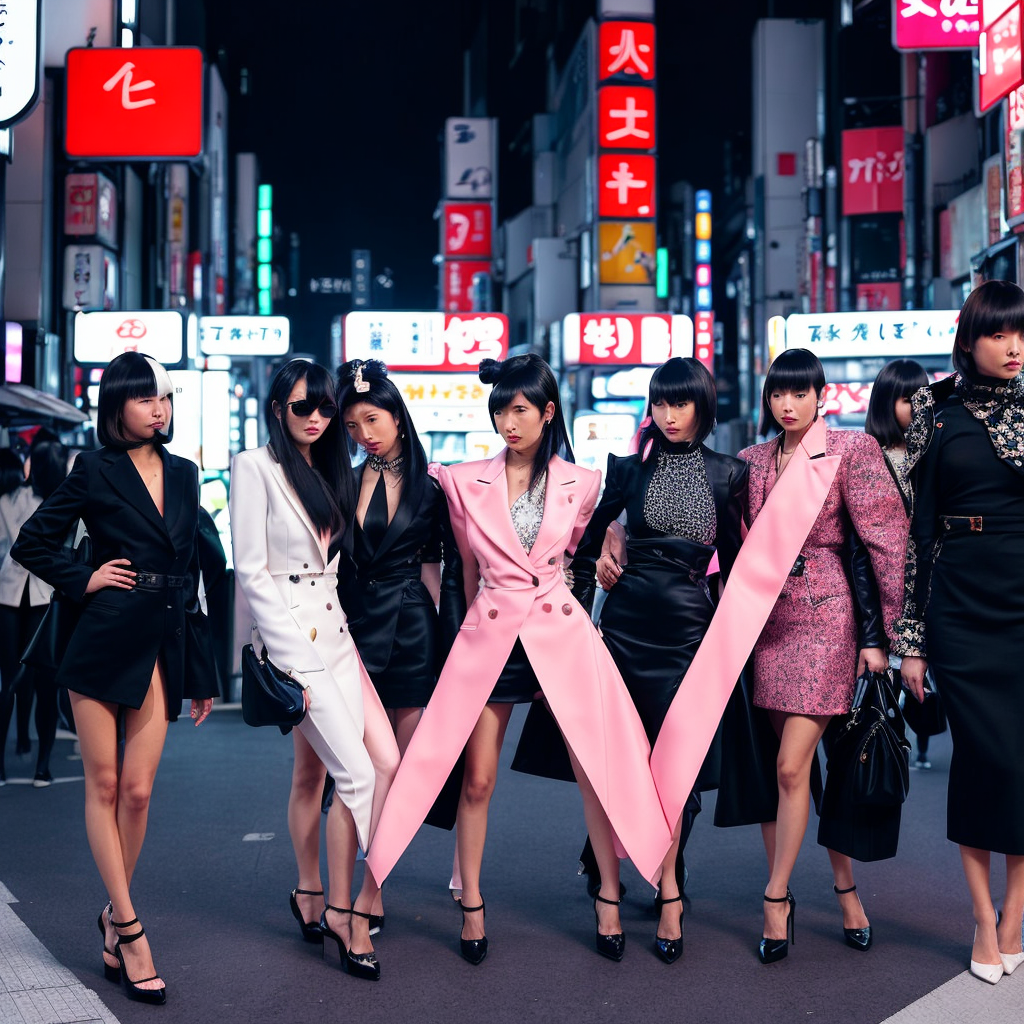
An example of the pattern feature of Artbreeder, if you squint, you can see the Wikipedia logo.

ArtBreeder underwent an overhaul, introducing several features to enhance the user experience. Among these updates is the integration SD-XL, developed by stability.ai. Additionally, ArtBreeder also added a functionality known as ControlNet, which enables users to create images based on specific poses. With ControlNet, users can incorporate various poses into their AI Artworks. More features that were introduced into Artbreeder, are Pattern, which creates AI Pattern Images, Outpainting or Uncropping was also an added feature to Artbreeder, that allows the user to expand the image beyond the normal dimensions of the image.

== Reception ==
The artwork generated by users of the website has been described as "beautiful" and "surreal," drawing comparisons to "weird, incomprehensible dreams" that "somehow touch the deep, unconscious parts of [the] mind". However, the generated faces were noted as "creepy and 'off'", and still nowhere near the quality attained by actual digital artists.

Additionally, the site faced criticism for perceived confusing aspects of the AI's behavior. Jonathan Bartlett of Mind Matters News noted that "As is always the case with AI, sometimes the [gene] knobs don't work as expected and sometimes the results are... strange," while conceding that Artbreeder was still "probably the start of a new future of made-to-order stock images." Writers from Hyperallergic also took issue with perceived racial biases in the Portraits model, citing a comment from a user who faced difficulty from the neural network while attempting to darken the skin of a portrait to match a source image.

== See also ==
- This Person Does Not Exist
- DALL-E
- Stable Diffusion
- Text-to-image model

== Bibliography ==
- George, Binto; Carmichael, Gail (2021). Mathai, Susan (ed.). Artificial Intelligence Simplified: Understanding Basic Concepts (2nd ed.). CSTrends LLP. ISBN 9781944708047.
