= L. australis =

L. australis may refer to:

- Lagenorhynchus australis, the former scientific name for Peale's dolphin (Sagmatias australis), a small dolphin species found in the waters around Tierra del Fuego at the foot of South America
- Livistona australis, the cabbage-tree palm, a plant species
- Limnohabitans australis, a planktonic freshwater bacterium affiliated with the class Betaproteobacteria and the family Comamonadaceae

== See also ==
- Australis (disambiguation)
