= H. intermedia =

H. intermedia may refer to:

- Hexatoma intermedia, a crane fly species
- Helina intermedia, a fly species in the genus Helina
- Heringia intermedia, a hoverfly species in the genus Heringia
- Hilara intermedia, a dance fly species in the genus Hilara
- Hydrogenophaga intermedia, a bacterium species in the genus Hydrogenophaga
- Hyla intermedia, the Italian tree frog, a frog species found in Italy, Slovenia and Switzerland

== Synonyms ==
- Hecatera intermedia, a synonym for Hecatera bicolorata, the broad-barred white, a moth species found throughout Europe and in Asia

== See also ==
- Intermedia (disambiguation)
