= Polaromonas glacialis =

Scientific classification
- Domain: Bacteria
- Kingdom: Pseudomonadati
- Phylum: Pseudomonadota
- Class: Betaproteobacteria
- Order: Burkholderiales
- Family: Comamonadaceae
- Genus: Polaromonas
- Species: P. glacialis

Binomial name
- Polaromonas glacialis Margesin et al. 2012

Type strain
- Cr4-12, DSM 24062, KACC 15089, LMG 26049

Species of bacterium

Polaromonas glacialis is a Gram-negative, psychrophilic bacterium from the genus Polaromonas, which was isolated with Polaromonas cryoconiti from an alpine glacier.
