= Manganoxidans =

Manganoxidans may refer to:

- Caldimonas manganoxidans, species of bacteria
- Pacificitalea manganoxidans, species of bacteria
