= Limnohabitans parvus =

Scientific classification
- Domain: Bacteria
- Kingdom: Pseudomonadati
- Phylum: Pseudomonadota
- Class: Betaproteobacteria
- Order: Burkholderiales
- Family: Comamonadaceae
- Genus: Limnohabitans
- Species: L. parvus

Binomial name
- Limnohabitans parvus Kasalický et al. 2010

Type strain
- CIP 109845, DSM 21592, II-B4

Species of bacterium

Limnohabitans parvus is a Gram-negative, aerobic, oxidase- and catalase-positive, unpigmented, short-rod-shaped, nonmotile bacterium from the genus Limnohabitans, which was isolated with Limnohabitans planktonicus from the mesoeutrophic freshwater reservoir in Římov in the Czech Republic.
