= Acidovorax facilis =

Scientific classification
- Domain: Bacteria
- Kingdom: Pseudomonadati
- Phylum: Pseudomonadota
- Class: Betaproteobacteria
- Order: Burkholderiales
- Family: Comamonadaceae
- Genus: Acidovorax
- Species: A. facilis

Binomial name
- Acidovorax facilis (Schatz & Bovell 1952; Willems et al. 1990)

Synonyms
- Hydrogenomonas facilis (Schatz and Bovell 1952); Pseudomonas facilis (Schatz and Bovell 1952; Davis 1969)

Species of bacterium

Acidovorax facilis is an aerobic, chemoorganotrophic, Gram-negative bacterium used as a soil inoculant in agriculture and horticulture.

== Description ==
Members of A. facilis are generally 1.0-5.0 μm long and 0.2-0.7 μm wide. Under a microscope, they appear as straight to slightly curved rods that occurs singly or in short chains. A. facilis are motile via a single flagellum at one end of the bacterium. They are negative by Gram stain and positive by the oxidase test. When grown on nutrient agar, they form unpigmented colonies. The optimum growth temperature is 30 °C. They grow in the presence of oxygen.

== Uses ==
A. facilis has been used in agriculture and horticulture as a soil additive to improve plant growth. Additionally, a nitrilase enzyme from A. facilis has been engineered into E. coli for the commercial production of 3-hydroxyvaleric acid.

== History ==
A. facilis was originally isolated from lawn soil in the United States by Albert Schatz and Carlton Bovell in 1950 and named Hydrogenomas facilis. In 1969, the genus Hydrogenomonas was abandoned and H. facilis was transferred to the genus Pseudomonas. Eventually, Pseudomonas was determined to contain several genera of bacteria, and so in 1990 Pseudomonas facilis, Pseudomonas delafieldii, and several other strains of Pseudomonas and Alcaligenes were transferred to the new genus Acidovorax.

== See also ==
- Acidovorax
