= Acidovorax wohlfahrtii =

Scientific classification
- Domain: Bacteria
- Kingdom: Pseudomonadati
- Phylum: Pseudomonadota
- Class: Betaproteobacteria
- Order: Burkholderiales
- Family: Comamonadaceae
- Genus: Acidovorax
- Species: A. wohlfahrtii

Binomial name
- Acidovorax wohlfahrtii

Type strain
- Cl-09 16S

Species of bacterium

Acidovorax wohlfahrtii is a bacterium from the genus Acidovorax and the family Comamonadaceae.
