= Acidovorax anthurii =

Scientific classification
- Domain: Bacteria
- Kingdom: Pseudomonadati
- Phylum: Pseudomonadota
- Class: Betaproteobacteria
- Order: Burkholderiales
- Family: Comamonadaceae
- Genus: Acidovorax
- Species: A. anthurii

Binomial name
- Acidovorax anthurii Gardan et al. 2000

Species of bacterium

Acidovorax anthurii is a Gram-negative bacterium which causes plant diseases. This species belongs to Comamonadaceae.
