= Tepidimonas thermarum =

Scientific classification
- Domain: Bacteria
- Kingdom: Pseudomonadati
- Phylum: Pseudomonadota
- Class: Betaproteobacteria
- Order: Burkholderiales
- Family: Comamonadaceae
- Genus: Tepidimonas
- Species: T. thermarum

Binomial name
- Tepidimonas thermarum Albuquerque et al. 2007

Type strain
- AA-1, CIP 108777, LMG 23094

Species of bacterium

Tepidimonas thermarum is a Gram-negative, strictly aerobic, oxidase- and catalase-positive, slightly thermophilic, rod-shaped, motile bacterium with a single polar flagellum from the genus Tepidimonas, which was isolated from the Elisenquelle in Aachen.
