= Rhodoferax ferrireducens =

Scientific classification
- Domain: Bacteria
- Kingdom: Pseudomonadati
- Phylum: Pseudomonadota
- Class: Betaproteobacteria
- Order: Burkholderiales
- Family: Comamonadaceae
- Genus: Rhodoferax
- Species: R. ferrireducens

Binomial name
- Rhodoferax ferrireducens Finneran et al. 2003

Type strain
- ATCC BAA-621, DSM 15236, T118

Species of bacterium

Rhodoferax ferrireducens is a psychrotolerant bacterium from the genus Rhodoferax, which was isolated from the mud of Oyster Bay in Virginia.

It has been found to be capable of producing electricity as it feeds on sugars, as a component in a bacterial battery.
