= Acidovorax konjaci =

Scientific classification
- Domain: Bacteria
- Kingdom: Pseudomonadati
- Phylum: Pseudomonadota
- Class: Betaproteobacteria
- Order: Burkholderiales
- Family: Comamonadaceae
- Genus: Acidovorax
- Species: A. konjaci

Binomial name
- Acidovorax konjaci (Goto 1983) Willems et al. 1992

Species of bacterium

Acidovorax konjaci is a Gram-negative bacterium. It can cause a plant disease, the leaf blight of Amorphophallus rivieri, a food crop of Japan.
