= Aquabacterium commune =

Scientific classification
- Domain: Bacteria
- Kingdom: Pseudomonadati
- Phylum: Pseudomonadota
- Class: Betaproteobacteria
- Order: Burkholderiales
- Family: Comamonadaceae
- Genus: Aquabacterium
- Species: A. commune

Binomial name
- Aquabacterium commune Kalmbach et al. 1999, sp. nov.

Type strain
- ATCC BAA-209, B8, CCM 4957, CCUG 48318, CIP 106984, DSM 11901, NCIMB 13782, strain B8

Species of bacterium

Aquabacterium commune is a Gram-negative, catalase-negative bacterium of the genus Aquabacterium in the family Comamonadaceae, which was isolated with Aquabacterium citratiphilum and Aquabacterium parvum from biofilms of drinking water in Berlin. Aquabacterium commune has got a single polar flagellum and its colonies are transparent.
