= Variovorax paradoxus =

Scientific classification
- Domain: Bacteria
- Kingdom: Pseudomonadati
- Phylum: Pseudomonadota
- Class: Betaproteobacteria
- Order: Burkholderiales
- Family: Comamonadaceae
- Genus: Variovorax
- Species: V. paradoxus

Binomial name
- Variovorax paradoxus

Type strain
- 13-0-1D, ATCC 17713, BCRC 17070, CCM 4467, CCRC 17070, CCUG 1777, CIP 103459, DSM 30034, DSM 66, IAM 12373, IAM 13535, ICPB 3985, IFO 15149, JCM 20526, JCM 20895, KACC 10222, KCTC 1007, KCTC 12459, LGM 1797t1, LMG 11797 t1, LMG 1797, NBRC 15149, NCIB 11964, NCIMB 11964, VKM B-1329

Species of bacterium

Variovorax paradoxus is a gram negative, beta proteobacterium from the genus Variovorax. Strains of V. paradoxus can be categorized into two groups, hydrogen oxidizers and heterotrophic strains, both of which are aerobic. The genus name Vario-vorax (various-voracious; devouring a variety of substrates) and species name para-doxus (contrary-opinion) reflects both the dichotomy of V. paradoxus metabolisms, but also its ability to utilize a wide array of organic compounds.

== Morphology and physiology ==
V. paradoxus cells are curved rods in shape, with dimensions of 0.3-0.6 x 0.7-3.0 μm in size and normally occur as either single or pairs of cells. Typically, cells have 1-3 peritrichous, degenerate flagella. Colonies of V. paradoxus are yellow-green in colour, due to the production of carotenoid pigments, and often have an iridescent sheen. Colony shape is normally convex, round and smooth, but can also display flat, undulate margins. V. paradoxus grows optimally at 30 °C in most growth media, including M9-glucose. On nutrient agar and M9-glucose agar, colonies take 24–48 hours to grow to a few millimetres in size.

Pantothenate is a characteristic carbon source utilized by V. paradoxus; it was the use of this sole carbon source that lead to the isolation of the first known strain of V. paradoxus. Polyhydroxyalkanoates (PHA), including poly-3-hydroxybutyrate (3-PHB), are stored intracellularly by V. paradoxus cells when carbon is abundant and other factors limit growth

== Genome Sequences ==
The genomes of four strains of V. paradoxus have been sequenced, S110, EPS, B4 and TBEA6. S110 was isolated from the interior of a potato plant and was identified as a degrader of AHLs. This strain has two chromosomes (5.63 and 1.13Mb), a G+C content of 67.4% and a predicted number of 6279 open reading frames (ORF). EPS was isolated from the rhizosphere community of the sunflower (Helianthus annuus), and was initially studied for its motility. It has one chromosome (6.65Mb), a G+C content of 66.48% and a total of 6008 genes identified. The genomes of B4 and TBEA6 were sequenced with specific interest to better understand the strains abilities to degrade mercaptosuccinate and 3,3 -thiodipropionic acid respectively.

== Occurrence ==
Found ubiquitously, V. paradoxus has been isolated from a diverse range of environments including soil, the rhizosphere of numerous plant species, drinking water, ground water, freshwater iron seeps, ferromanganese deposits in carbonate cave systems, deep marine sediments, silver mine spoil, gold-arsenopyrite mine drainage water, rubber tyre leachate and surface snow. In particularly, V. paradoxus is abundant in numerous environments that are contaminated with either recalcitrant organic compounds or heavy metals. V. paradoxus is also commonly found in plant rhizosphere communities and is a known plant growth-promoting bacterium (PGPB). It is from these two types of environments that V. paradoxus has been most extensively studied.

== Role in the environment ==
V. paradoxus's diverse metabolic capabilities enable it to degrade a wide array of recalcitrant organic pollutants including 2,4-dinitrotoluene, aliphatic polycarbonates and polychlorinated biphenyls. Both its catabolic and anabolic capabilities have been suggested for biotechnological use, such as to neutralise or degrade pollutants at contaminated sites.

The role of V. paradoxus in the plant root rhizosphere and surrounding soil has been investigated in several plant species, with implicated growth promoting mechanisms including reducing plant stress, increasing nutrient availability and inhibiting growth of plant pathogens; many of these mechanisms relate to the species catabolic capabilities. In the rhizosphere of pea plants (Pisum sativum), V. paradoxus was shown to increase both growth and yield by degrading the ethylene precursor molecule 1-aminocyclopropane-1-carboxylate (ACC), using a secreted ACC deaminase. Strains of V. paradoxus have also been identified that can degrade N-acyl homoserine-lactones (AHL), microbial signalling molecules involved in quorum sensing. It is hypothesized that this ability could provide a host plant protection from pathogenic infection, with the impact of quorum quenching to reduce virulence in pathogenic strains present.

V. paradoxus is involved in cycling numerous inorganic elements including arsenic, sulfur, manganese and rare earth elements in a range of soil, freshwater and geological environments. In the case of arsenic, V. paradoxus is believed to oxidize As (III) to As (V) as a detoxification mechanism. V. paradoxus has been found in a range of rocky environments including carbonate caves, mine spoil and deep marine sediments, but the role of this organism within these environments is largely unstudied. The species is also tolerant of a large number of heavy metals including cadmium, chromium, cobalt, copper, lead, mercury, nickel, silver, zinc at mM concentrations. Despite this, very little is known about the physiological adaptions V. paradoxus uses to support this tolerance. The sequenced genome of the endophytic strain V. paradoxus S110 provides some clues to the organism's metal tolerance by identifying key molecular machinery in processing metals such as the arsenic reductase complex ArsRBC, metal transporting P1-type ATPases and a chemiosmotic antiporter efflux system similar to CzcCBA of Cupriavidus metallidurans. Cupriavidus species, including C. metallidurans, are well characterised in the field of microbe-metal interactions, and are found within the same order (Burkholderiales) as V. paradoxus. Both the species C. necator and C. metallidurans (when not distinguished as separate species) were originally classified in the genera Alcaligenes along with V. paradoxus (Alcaligenes eutrophus and Alicaligenes paradoxus). This relationship with other heavy metal resistant species may help to partially explain the evolutionary history of V. paradoxus's metal tolerance.

== Motility and biofilm formation ==
Variovorax paradoxus EPS swarming time-lapse video, swarming on FW-succinate-NH4Cl medium, taken 18 h after inoculation, 2 h time lapse, 3 m between frames.

The V. paradoxus strain EPS has been shown capable of swarming motility and biofilm formation. Jamieson et al. demonstrate that altering the carbon and nitrogen sources provided in the swarming agar causes variation in both swarm colony size and morphology. Mutagenesis studies have revealed that the swarming capability of V. paradoxus is largely dependent on a gene involved surfactant production, a type IV pili component and the ShkRS two component system. Dense biofilms of V. paradoxus can be grown in M9 medium with carbon sources including d-sorbitol, glucose, malic acid, mannitol and sucrose and casamino acids. Production of exopolysaccharide was hypothesized to be a controlling factor in biofilm formation. V. paradoxus biofilms take on a honeycomb morphology, as identified in many other species of biofilm forming bacteria.
