= Diaphorobacter nitroreducens =

Scientific classification
- Domain: Bacteria
- Kingdom: Pseudomonadati
- Phylum: Pseudomonadota
- Class: Betaproteobacteria
- Order: Burkholderiales
- Family: Comamonadaceae
- Genus: Diaphorobacter
- Species: D. nitroreducens

Binomial name
- Diaphorobacter nitroreducens Khan and Hiraishi 2003

Type strain
- CIP 107294, DSM 15985, JCM 11421, NA10B

Species of bacterium

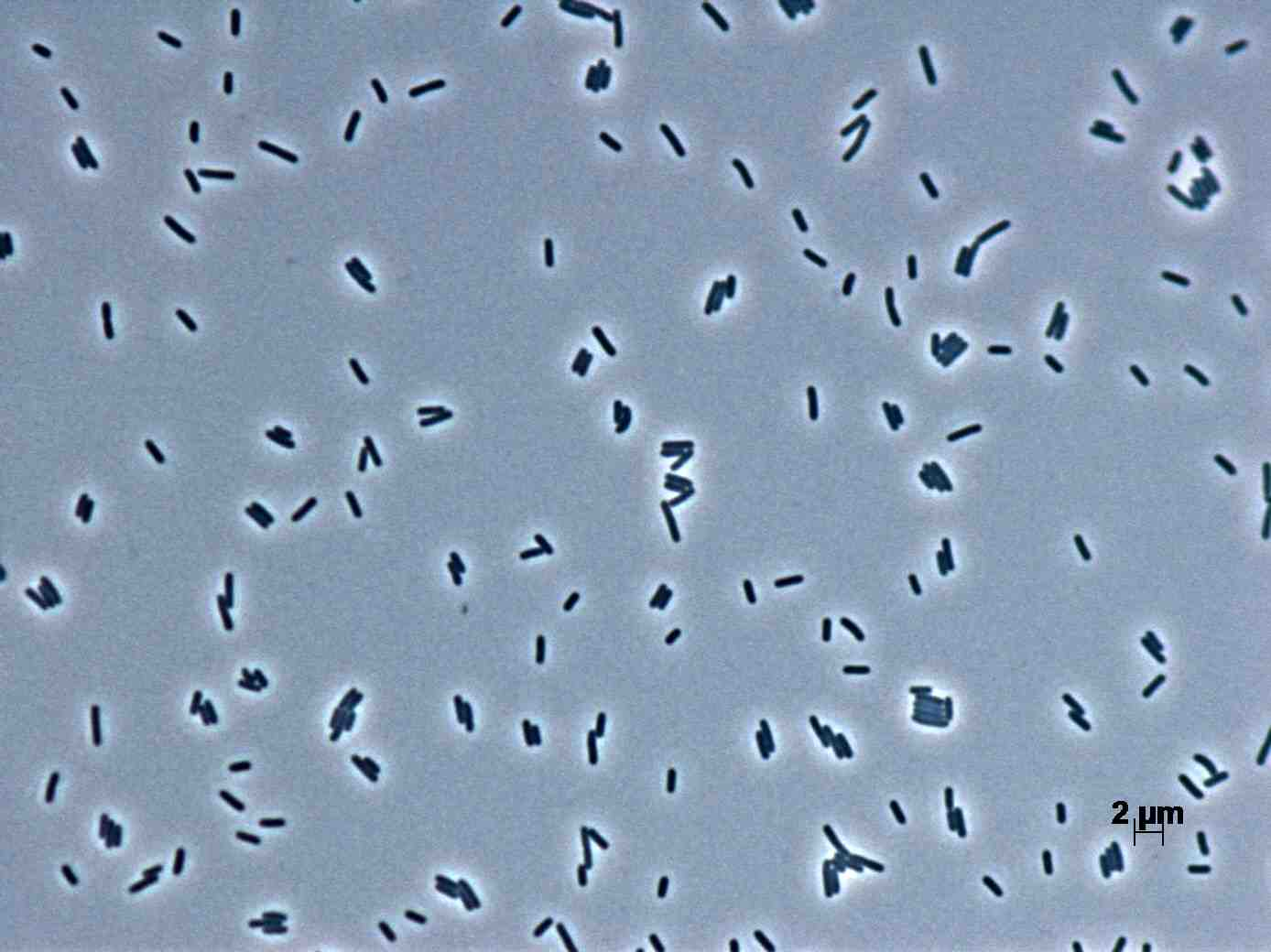
Diaphorobacter nitroreducens under a microscope

Diaphorobacter nitroreducens is a Gram-negative bacterium from the genus Diaphorobacter which has been isolated from activated sludge in Japan.
