= Curvibacter delicatus =

Scientific classification
- Domain: Bacteria
- Kingdom: Pseudomonadati
- Phylum: Pseudomonadota
- Class: Betaproteobacteria
- Order: Burkholderiales
- Family: Comamonadaceae
- Genus: Curvibacter
- Species: C. delicatus

Binomial name
- Curvibacter delicatus Ding and Yokota 2004, comb. nov.

Type strain
- 146, ATCC 14667, CCUG 15846, CIP 107314, DSM 11558, IAM 14955, IFO 14919, JCM 15147, JCM 21432, Leifson 146, LMG 4327, LMG 4328, NBRC 14919, NCIB 9419, NCIMB 9419

Synonyms
- Spirillum delicatum; Aquaspirillum delicatum

Species of bacterium

Curvibacter delicatus is a Gram-negative bacterium from the genus Curvibacter and family Comamonadaceae, which was isolated from well water.
