= Caenimonas koreensis =

Scientific classification
- Domain: Bacteria
- Kingdom: Pseudomonadati
- Phylum: Pseudomonadota
- Class: Betaproteobacteria
- Order: Burkholderiales
- Family: Comamonadaceae
- Genus: Caenimonas
- Species: C. koreensis

Binomial name
- Caenimonas koreensis Ryu et al. 2008

Type strain
- DSM 17982, EMB320, KCTC 12616

Species of bacterium

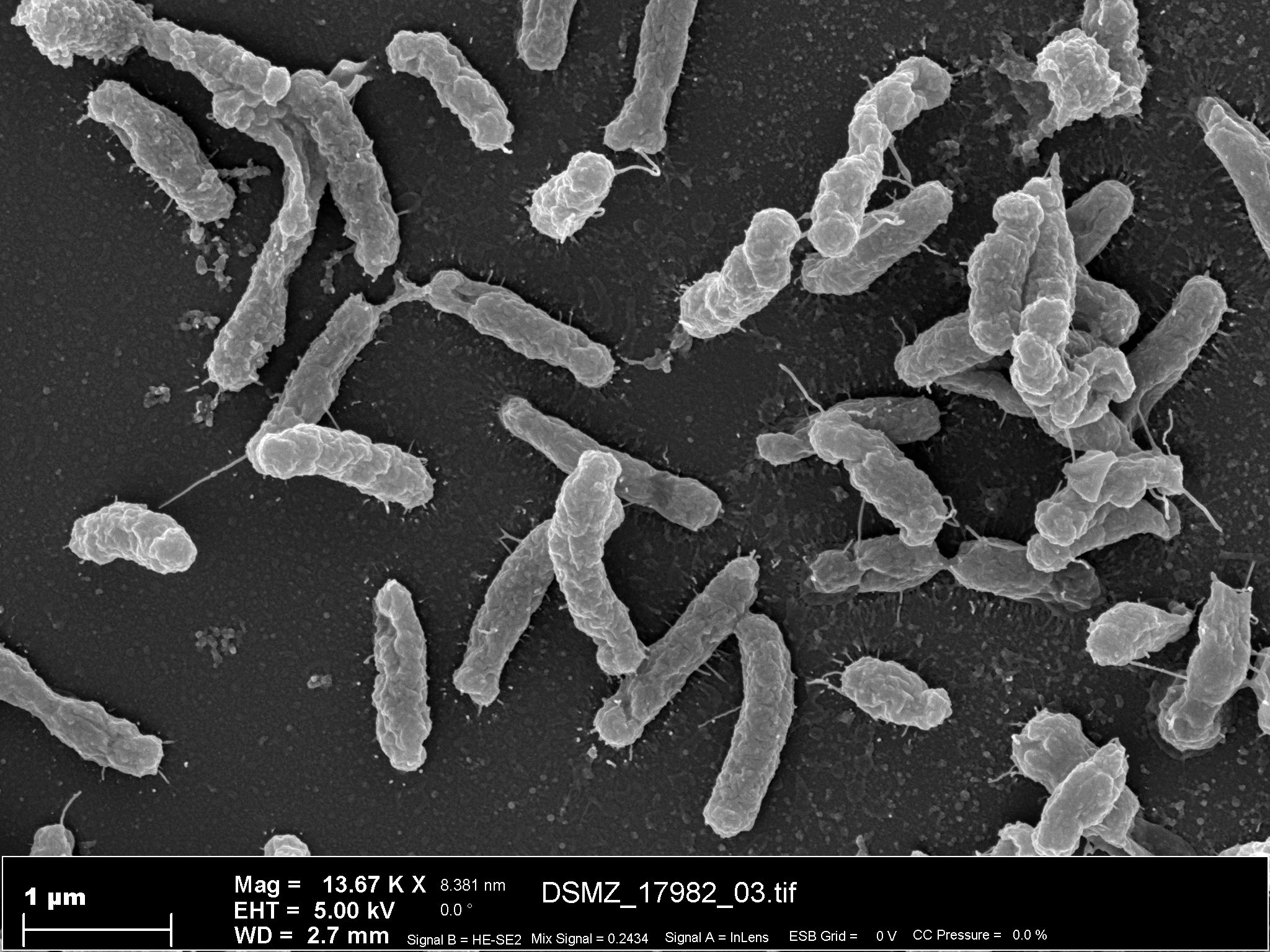

Caenimonas koreensis is a Gram-negative, strictly aerobic, rod-shaped and non-motile bacterium from the genus of Caenimonas which has been isolated from activated sludge in Pohang on Korea.
