= Polaromonas vacuolata =

Scientific classification
- Domain: Bacteria
- Kingdom: Pseudomonadati
- Phylum: Pseudomonadota
- Class: Betaproteobacteria
- Order: Burkholderiales
- Family: Comamonadaceae
- Genus: Polaromonas
- Species: P. vacuolata

Binomial name
- Polaromonas vacuolata Irgens et al. 1996

Type strain
- 34-P, ATCC 51984, CCUG 51245, CCUG 52837

Species of bacterium

Polaromonas vacuolata is a psychrophilic bacterium with gas vesicles from the genus Polaromonas, which was isolated from Antarctica. The optimum temperature for growth is 4 °C, and the growth temperature range is 0 to 12 °C. Colonies are snowy white, circular, and convex with smooth surfaces and entire edges. The more gas vesicles within the cells, the whiter the colony. Good growth occurs in media containing NaCl at concentrations ranging from 0 to 6.0%, but no growth occurs in the presence of 7.0% NaCl.

Tests for catalase, oxidase, urease, deaminase, and lipase are positive. Amylase, protease (gelatin), tryptophanase (indole), nitrate reductase, cysteine desulfurase, and agarase tests are negative.

The following carbon sources are utilized: acetate, lactate, malate, fumarate, pyruvate, propionate, citrate, succinate, oxaloacetate, butyrate, 2-oxoglutarate7 glucose, glycerol, sorbitol, DL-alanine, DL-glutamate, DL-proline, DL-aspartate, and DL-asparagine.

The following carbon sources are not utilized: maltose, D- fructose, sucrose, lactose, D-xylose, D-ribose, formate, cellobiose, D-mannose, L-fucose, melibiose, melezitose, L-rhamnose, sorbose, trehalose, methanol, ethanol, erythritol, propanol, benzoate, malonate, DL-arginine, glycine, DL-serine, DL-isoleucine, DL-lysine, DL-histidine, DL-ornithine, DL-methionhe, DL- valine, DL-threonine, and DL-tryptophan.

The fatty acid composition is 75% 16:l o7c, 17% 16:0, and 8% 18:l 07c, 18:l o9t, or 18:l o12t. Susceptible to novobiocin, tetracycline, neomycin, and kanamycin. Resistant to bacitracin, streptomycin, and gentamicin.

The G+C content is 52.0 mol% (as determined by the thermal denaturation method).
