= Variovorax gossypii =

Scientific classification
- Domain: Bacteria
- Kingdom: Pseudomonadati
- Phylum: Pseudomonadota
- Class: Betaproteobacteria
- Order: Burkholderiales
- Family: Comamonadaceae
- Genus: Variovorax
- Species: V. gossypii

Binomial name
- Variovorax gossypii Kampfer et al. 2015

Type strain
- CCM 8614, CIP 110912, LMG 28869, JM-310

Species of bacterium

Variovorax gossypii is a Gram-negative and small rod-shaped bacterium from the genus of Variovorax which has been isolated from the plant Gossypium hirsutum from Tallassee in the United States.
