= Variovorax dokdonensis =

Scientific classification
- Domain: Bacteria
- Kingdom: Pseudomonadati
- Phylum: Pseudomonadota
- Class: Betaproteobacteria
- Order: Burkholderiales
- Family: Comamonadaceae
- Genus: Variovorax
- Species: V. dokdonensis

Binomial name
- Variovorax dokdonensis Yoon et al. 2006

Type strain
- CIP 108838, DSM 18312, KCTC 12544

Species of bacterium

Variovorax dokdonensis is a Gram-negative, motile bacterium from the genus Variovorax, which was isolated from soil in Dokdo in Korea. Colonies of V. dokdonensis are yellow in color.
