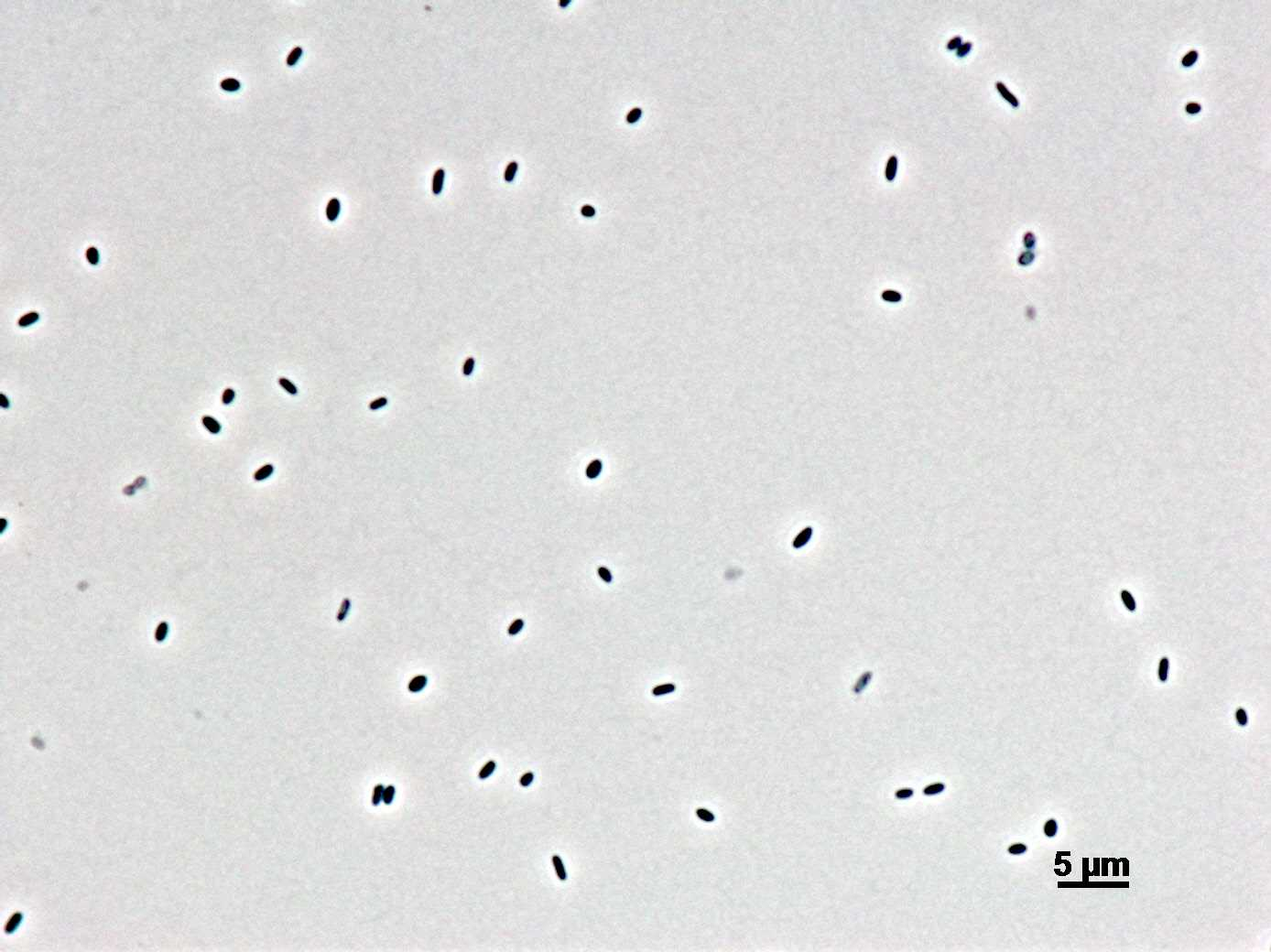

Scientific classification
- Domain: Bacteria
- Kingdom: Pseudomonadati
- Phylum: Pseudomonadota
- Class: Betaproteobacteria
- Order: Burkholderiales
- Family: Comamonadaceae
- Genus: Aquabacterium
- Species: A. olei

Binomial name
- Aquabacterium olei Pham et al. 2015

= Aquabacterium olei =

Species of bacterium

Aquabacterium olei is a Gram-negative, non-spore-forming and motile bacterium of the genus Aquabacterium which has been isolated from oil-contaminated soil in Korea. Aquabacterium olei can degrade oil.
