= Variovorax durovernensis =

Scientific classification
- Domain: Bacteria
- Kingdom: Pseudomonadati
- Phylum: Pseudomonadota
- Class: Betaproteobacteria
- Order: Burkholderiales
- Family: Comamonadaceae
- Genus: Variovorax
- Species: V. durovernensis

Binomial name
- Variovorax durovernensis Alcolea-Medina et al. 2023

Species of bacteria

Variovorax durovernensis is a Gram-negative bacteria species discovered in December 2023, and assigned to the Variovorax genus. The bacteria was discovered by a group of researches affiliated with Guy's and St. Thomas' NHS Foundation Trust with the help of other institutions. The bacteria was found in a patient diagnosed with an infection in London, United Kingdom.
