= Aquabacterium parvum =

Scientific classification
- Domain: Bacteria
- Kingdom: Pseudomonadati
- Phylum: Pseudomonadota
- Class: Betaproteobacteria
- Order: Burkholderiales
- Family: Comamonadaceae
- Genus: Aquabacterium
- Species: A. parvum

Binomial name
- Aquabacterium parvum Kalmbach et al. 1999, sp. nov.

Type strain
- ATCC BAA-208, B6, CCM 4958, CCUG 48317, CIP 106983, DSM 11968, NCIMB 13781, strain B6

Species of bacterium

Aquabacterium parvum is a Gram-negative, oxidase-positive, catalase-negative bacterium of the genus Aquabacterium in the family Comamonadaceae which was isolated with Aquabacterium commune and Aquabacterium citratiphilum from biofilms of Berlin's drinking water.
