= Ottowia flava =

Scientific classification
- Domain: Bacteria
- Kingdom: Pseudomonadati
- Phylum: Pseudomonadota
- Class: Betaproteobacteria
- Order: Burkholderiales
- Family: Comamonadaceae
- Genus: Ottowia
- Species: O. flava

Binomial name
- Ottowia flava Shi et al. 2020

Type strain
- GY511

Species of bacterium

Ottowia flava is a Gram-negative, short-rod-shaped and non-motile bacterium from the genus Ottowia which has been isolated from the intestine a of fish from the Maowei Sea in China.
