= Tepidimonas taiwanensis =

Scientific classification
- Domain: Bacteria
- Kingdom: Pseudomonadati
- Phylum: Pseudomonadota
- Class: Betaproteobacteria
- Order: Burkholderiales
- Family: Comamonadaceae
- Genus: Tepidimonas
- Species: T. taiwanensis

Binomial name
- Tepidimonas taiwanensis Chen et al. 2006

Type strain
- BCRC 17406, CCRC 17406, LMG 22826

Species of bacterium

Tepidimonas taiwanensis is a Gram-negative, motile bacterium with a single polar flagellum from the genus Tepidimonas, which was isolated from a hot spring in the Pingtung area in southern Taiwan.
