= Variovorax ginsengisoli =

Scientific classification
- Domain: Bacteria
- Kingdom: Pseudomonadati
- Phylum: Pseudomonadota
- Class: Betaproteobacteria
- Order: Burkholderiales
- Family: Comamonadaceae
- Genus: Variovorax
- Species: V. ginsengisoli

Binomial name
- Variovorax ginsengisoli Im et al. 2010

Type strain
- Gsoil 3165, KCTC 12583, Lee Gsoil 3165, LMG 23392

Species of bacterium

Variovorax ginsengisoli is a Gram-negative, non-spore-forming, rod-shaped, motile bacterium from the genus Variovorax, which was isolated from soil from a ginseng field in Pocheon in South Korea. Colonies of V. ginsengisoli are yellowish in color.
