= Rhodoferax saidenbachensis =

Scientific classification
- Domain: Bacteria
- Kingdom: Pseudomonadati
- Phylum: Pseudomonadota
- Class: Betaproteobacteria
- Order: Burkholderiales
- Family: Comamonadaceae
- Genus: Rhodoferax
- Species: R. saidenbachensis

Binomial name
- Rhodoferax saidenbachensis Kaden et al. 2014

Species of bacterium

Rhodoferax saidenbachensis is a Gram-negative and rod-shaped bacterium from the genus Rhodoferax which has been isolated from fresh water of the Saidenbach reservoir in Germany.
