= Aquabacterium hongkongensis =

Scientific classification
- Domain: Bacteria
- Kingdom: Pseudomonadati
- Phylum: Pseudomonadota
- Class: Betaproteobacteria
- Order: Burkholderiales
- Family: Comamonadaceae
- Genus: Aquabacterium
- Species: A. hongkongensis

Binomial name
- Aquabacterium hongkongensis Lin et al. 2009, sp. nov.

Species of bacterium

Aquabacterium hongkongensis is a bacterium of the genus Aquabacterium, in the family Comamonadaceae.
