= Tepidimonas aquatica =

Scientific classification
- Domain: Bacteria
- Kingdom: Pseudomonadati
- Phylum: Pseudomonadota
- Class: Betaproteobacteria
- Order: Burkholderiales
- Family: Comamonadaceae
- Genus: Tepidimonas
- Species: T. aquatica

Binomial name
- Tepidimonas aquatica Freitas et al. 2003

Type strain
- ATCC BAA-469, BCRC 17573, CCRC 17573, CCUG 34595, CCUG 48750, CLN-1, Costa CLN-1, DSM 14833, R-3582, Vandamme R-3582, VTT E-072698, Västerås Hy447

Species of bacterium

Tepidimonas aquatica is a gram-negative, aerobic, oxidase and catalase-positive thermophilic, rod-shaped, motile bacterium, with one polar flagellum from the genus Tepidimonas, which was isolated from a domestic water tank in Coimbra.
