= Diaphorobacter aerolatus =

Scientific classification
- Domain: Bacteria
- Kingdom: Pseudomonadati
- Phylum: Pseudomonadota
- Class: Betaproteobacteria
- Order: Burkholderiales
- Family: Comamonadaceae
- Genus: Diaphorobacter
- Species: D. aerolatus

Binomial name
- Diaphorobacter aerolatus Kim et al. 2014

Type strain
- KACC 16536, NBRC 108926, strain 8604S-37

Species of bacterium

Diaphorobacter aerolatus is a Gram-negative, aerobic and non-motile bacterium from the genus of Diaphorobacter which has been isolated from air from Suwon in Korea.
