= Hydrogenophaga palleronii =

Scientific classification
- Domain: Bacteria
- Kingdom: Pseudomonadati
- Phylum: Pseudomonadota
- Class: Betaproteobacteria
- Order: Burkholderiales
- Family: Comamonadaceae
- Genus: Hydrogenophaga
- Species: H. palleronii

Binomial name
- Hydrogenophaga palleronii Willems et al. 1989, comb. nov.

Type strain
- ATCC 17724, CCUG 1780, CCUG 20334, CFBP 2445, CIP 103304, DSM 63, IAM 14930, LMG 2366, VKM B-1328

Synonyms
- Pseudomonas palleronii

Species of bacterium

Hydrogenophaga palleronii is a bacterium from the Comamonadaceae family, which has the ability to degrade 4-aminobenzenesulfonate.
