= Curvibacter gracilis =

Scientific classification
- Domain: Bacteria
- Kingdom: Pseudomonadati
- Phylum: Pseudomonadota
- Class: Betaproteobacteria
- Order: Burkholderiales
- Family: Comamonadaceae
- Genus: Curvibacter
- Species: C. gracilis

Binomial name
- Curvibacter gracilis Ding and Yokota 2004, sp. nov.

Type strain
- ATCC BAA-807, CCUG 49445, CIP 108608, IAM 15033, JCM 21496

Species of bacterium

Curvibacter gracilis is a Gram-negative bacterium from the genus Curvibacter and family Comamonadaceae, which was isolated from well water.
