= Hydrogenophaga aquatica =

Scientific classification
- Domain: Bacteria
- Kingdom: Pseudomonadati
- Phylum: Pseudomonadota
- Class: Betaproteobacteria
- Order: Burkholderiales
- Family: Comamonadaceae
- Genus: Hydrogenophaga
- Species: H. aquatica

Binomial name
- Hydrogenophaga aquatica Lin et al. 2017

Type strain
- BCRC 80937, JCM 31216, strain CC-KL-3

Species of bacterium

Hydrogenophaga aquatica is a Gram-negative, rod-shaped and aerobic bacterium from the genus of Hydrogenophaga which has been isolated from a hot spring.
