= Acidovorax defluvii =

Scientific classification
- Domain: Bacteria
- Kingdom: Pseudomonadati
- Phylum: Pseudomonadota
- Class: Betaproteobacteria
- Order: Burkholderiales
- Family: Comamonadaceae
- Genus: Acidovorax
- Species: A. defluvii

Binomial name
- Acidovorax defluvii Schulze et al. 1999

Species of bacterium

Acidovorax defluvii is a Gram-negative soil bacterium.
