= Rhodoferax antarcticus =

Scientific classification
- Domain: Bacteria
- Kingdom: Pseudomonadati
- Phylum: Pseudomonadota
- Class: Betaproteobacteria
- Order: Burkholderiales
- Family: Comamonadaceae
- Genus: Rhodoferax
- Species: R. antarcticus

Binomial name
- Rhodoferax antarcticus Madigan et al. 2001

Type strain
- ANT.BR = ATCC 700587

Species of bacterium

Rhodoferax antarcticus is a psychrophilic, phototrophic, nonsulfur, highly motile bacterium from the genus Rhodoferax, which was isolated from an Antarctic microbial mat in Ross Island.
