= Variovorax guangxiensis =

Scientific classification
- Domain: Bacteria
- Kingdom: Pseudomonadati
- Phylum: Pseudomonadota
- Class: Betaproteobacteria
- Order: Burkholderiales
- Family: Comamonadaceae
- Genus: Variovorax
- Species: V. guangxiensis

Binomial name
- Variovorax guangxiensis Gao et al. 2015

Type strain
- ACCC 05911, DSM 27352, GXGD002

Species of bacterium

Variovorax guangxiensis is an aerobic bacterium from the genus of Variovorax which has been isolated from rhizosphere soil of a banana tree (Musa paradisiaca) from Guangxi in China. Variovorax guangxiensis produces 1-aminocyclopropane-1-carboxylate deaminase.
