= Ottowia oryzae =

Ottowia beijingensis

Scientific classification
- Domain: Bacteria
- Kingdom: Pseudomonadati
- Phylum: Pseudomonadota
- Class: Betaproteobacteria
- Order: Burkholderiales
- Family: Comamonadaceae
- Genus: Ottowia
- Species: O. oryzae

Binomial name
- Ottowia oryzae Heo et al. 2018

Type strain
- KACC 19325, NBRC 113109, KADR8-3

Species of bacterium

Ottowia oryzae is a Gram-negative, non-spore-forming, short-rod-shaped and non-motile bacterium from the genus Ottowia which has been isolated from Andong sikhye from Korea.
