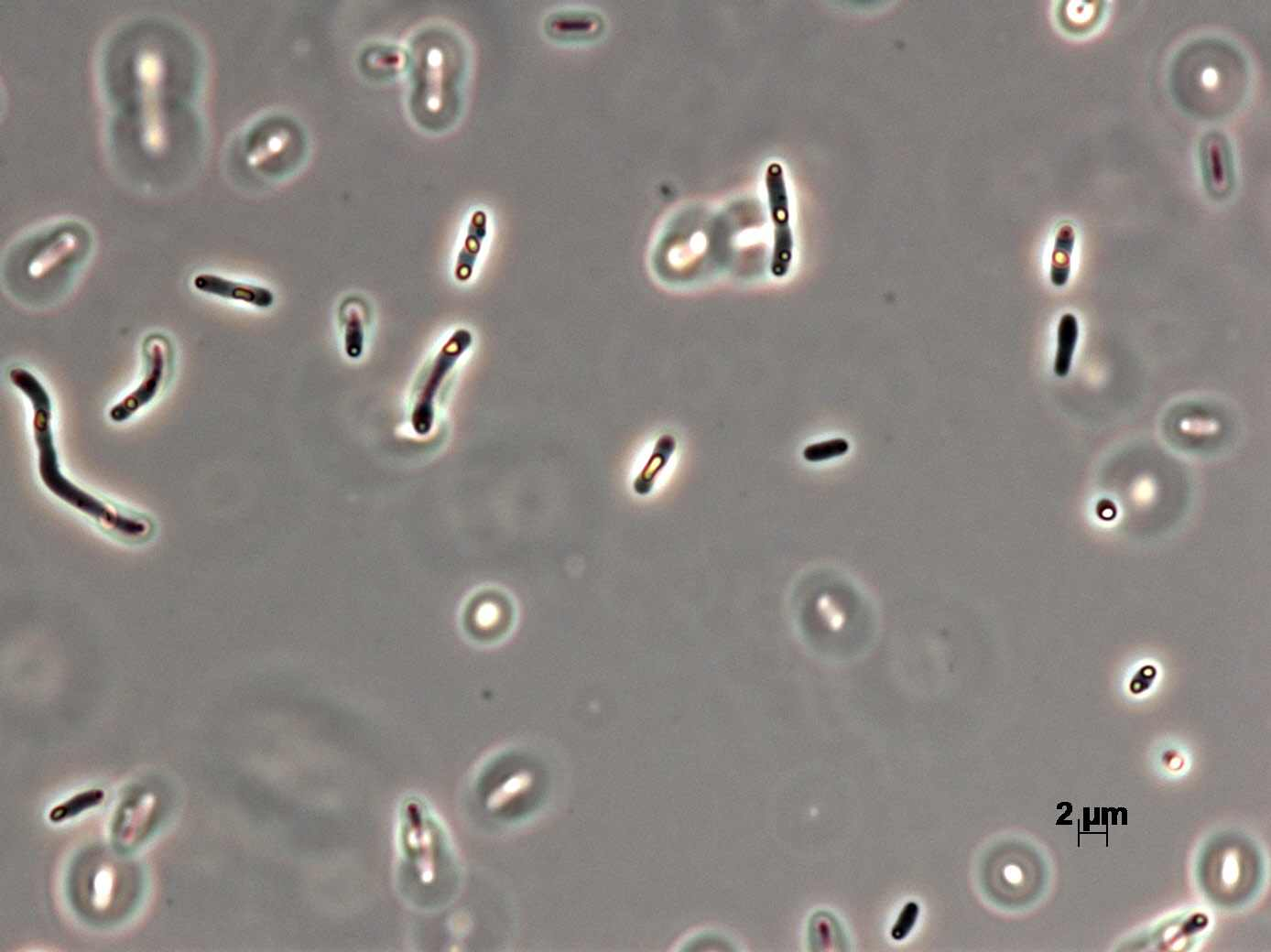
- Aquabacterium limnoticum

Scientific classification
- Domain: Bacteria
- Kingdom: Pseudomonadati
- Phylum: Pseudomonadota
- Class: Betaproteobacteria
- Order: Burkholderiales
- Family: Comamonadaceae
- Genus: Aquabacterium
- Species: A. limnoticum

Binomial name
- Aquabacterium limnoticum Chen et al. 2012

Type strain
- ABP-4, BCRC 80167, KCTC 23306

= Aquabacterium limnoticum =

Species of bacterium

Aquabacterium limnoticum is a Gram-negative, facultatively anaerobic, short-rod-shaped, non-spore-forming and non-motile bacterium of the genus Aquabacterium which has been isolated from a freshwater spring in Taiwan.
