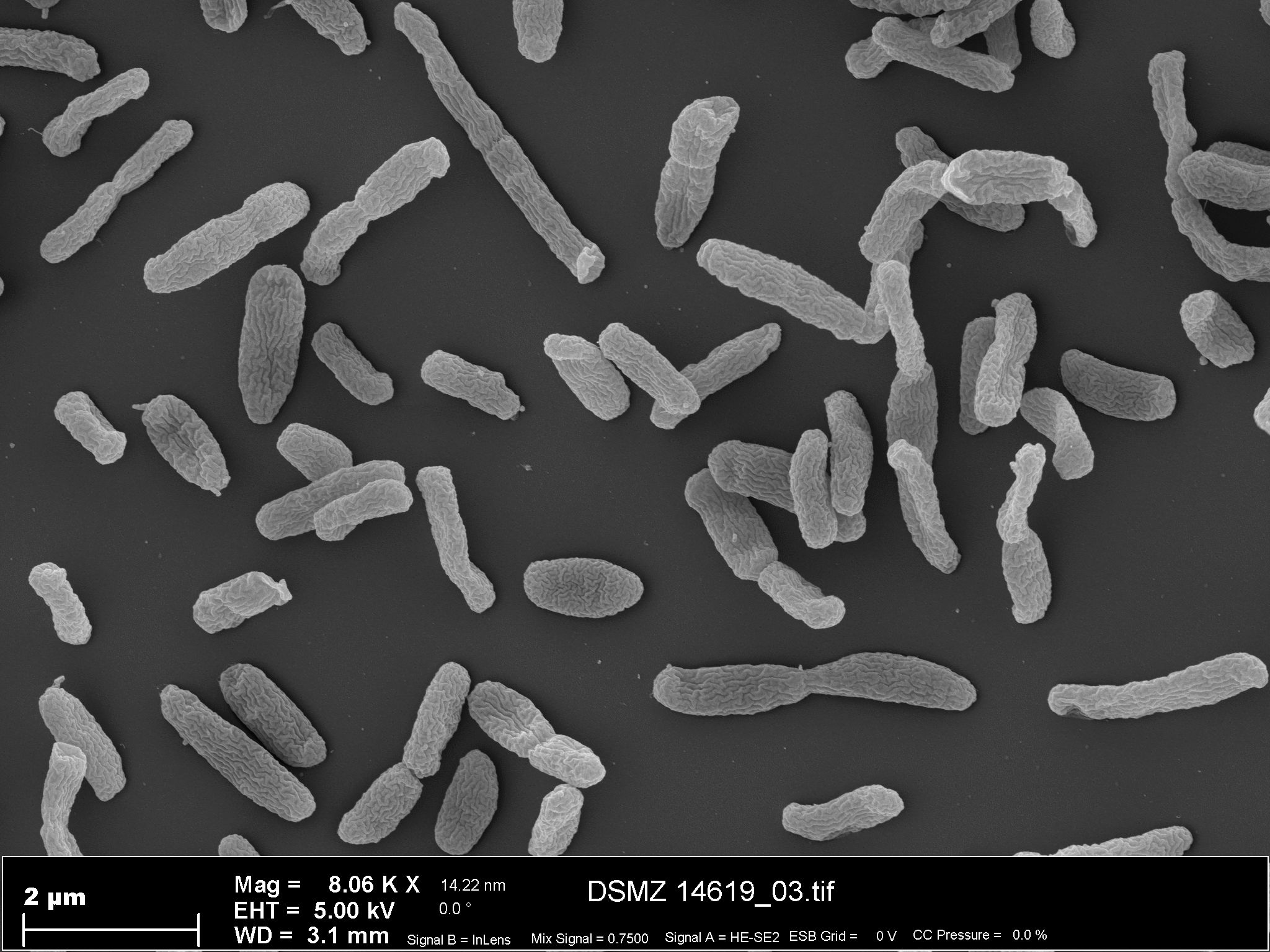

Scientific classification
- Domain: Bacteria
- Kingdom: Pseudomonadati
- Phylum: Pseudomonadota
- Class: Betaproteobacteria
- Order: Burkholderiales
- Family: Comamonadaceae
- Genus: Ottowia
- Species: O. thiooxydans

Binomial name
- Ottowia thiooxydans Spring et al. 2004

Type strain
- DSM 14619, JCM 11629

Synonyms
- Ottowia thiooxidans

= Ottowia thiooxydans =

Species of bacterium

Ottowia thiooxydans is a Gram-staining, facultatively anaerobic, N2O-producing and non-motile bacterium from the genus Ottowia which has been isolated from activated sludge from Munich in Germany.
