= Acidovorax soli =

Scientific classification
- Domain: Bacteria
- Kingdom: Pseudomonadati
- Phylum: Pseudomonadota
- Class: Betaproteobacteria
- Order: Burkholderiales
- Family: Comamonadaceae
- Genus: Acidovorax
- Species: A. soli

Binomial name
- Acidovorax soli Choi et al. 2010

Type strain
- BL21, JCM 15909, KCTC 22399

Species of bacterium

Acidovorax soli is a gram-negative, catalase-negative, oxidase-negative non-motile, rod-shaped aerobic bacterium from the family Comamonadaceae which was isolated from landfill soil in Pohang in Korea. Colonies of Acidovorax soli are bright yellow colored.
