= Polaromonas aquatica =

Scientific classification
- Domain: Bacteria
- Kingdom: Pseudomonadati
- Phylum: Pseudomonadota
- Class: Betaproteobacteria
- Order: Burkholderiales
- Family: Comamonadaceae
- Genus: Polaromonas
- Species: P. aquatica

Binomial name
- Polaromonas aquatica Kämpfer et al. 2006

Type strain
- CCUG 39402, CIP 108776, EMGS HB1-2, R-5535, Vandamme R-5535

Species of bacterium

Polaromonas aquatica is a Gram-negative, oxidase- and catalase-positive, rod-shaped, non-spore-forming bacterium from the genus Polaromonas, which was isolated from tap water.
