= Aquabacterium citratiphilum =

Scientific classification
- Domain: Bacteria
- Kingdom: Pseudomonadati
- Phylum: Pseudomonadota
- Class: Betaproteobacteria
- Order: Burkholderiales
- Family: Comamonadaceae
- Genus: Aquabacterium
- Species: A. citratiphilum

Binomial name
- Aquabacterium citratiphilum Kalmbach et al. 1999, sp. nov.

Type strain
- ATCC BAA-207, B4, CCM 4956, CCUG 53899, CIP 106985, DSM 11900, NCIMB 13783, strain B4

Species of bacterium

Aquabacterium citratiphilum is a Gram-negative, catalase-negative bacterium from the genus Aquabacterium and family Comamonadaceae, which was isolated with Aquabacterium commune and Aquabacterium parvum from biofilms of drinking water in Berlin.
