= Hydrogenophaga pseudoflava =

Scientific classification
- Domain: Bacteria
- Kingdom: Pseudomonadati
- Phylum: Pseudomonadota
- Class: Betaproteobacteria
- Order: Burkholderiales
- Family: Comamonadaceae
- Genus: Hydrogenophaga
- Species: H. pseudoflava

Binomial name
- Hydrogenophaga pseudoflava Willems et al. 1989, comb. nov.

Type strain
- NBRC 102511, LMG 5945, JCM 21410, DSM 1034, CIP 103270, CFBP 2439, CCUG 13799, ATCC 33668

Synonyms
- Pseudomonas carboxydoflava, Pseudomonas pseudoflava

Species of bacterium

Hydrogenophaga pseudoflava is a bacterium from the Comamonadaceae family.
