= Hydrogenophaga defluvii =

Scientific classification
- Domain: Bacteria
- Kingdom: Pseudomonadati
- Phylum: Pseudomonadota
- Class: Betaproteobacteria
- Order: Burkholderiales
- Family: Comamonadaceae
- Genus: Hydrogenophaga
- Species: H. defluvii

Binomial name
- Hydrogenophaga defluvii Kämpfer et al. 2005, sp. nov.

Type strain
- BSB 9.5, CCUG 53903, CIP 108119, DSM 15341

Species of bacterium

Hydrogenophaga defluvii is a Gram-negative, oxidase-positive, rod-shaped, motile bacterium from the Comamonadaceae family, which was isolated from wastewater. Colonies of H. defluvii are pale yellow in color.
