= Diaphorobacter oryzae =

Scientific classification
- Domain: Bacteria
- Kingdom: Pseudomonadati
- Phylum: Pseudomonadota
- Class: Betaproteobacteria
- Order: Burkholderiales
- Family: Comamonadaceae
- Genus: Diaphorobacter
- Species: D. oryzae

Binomial name
- Diaphorobacter oryzae Pham et al. 2009

Type strain
- KCTC 2222, LMG 24467, RF3

Species of bacterium

Diaphorobacter oryzae is a bacterium from the genus of Diaphorobacter which has been isolated from paddy soil from Cheongju in Korea.
