= Curvibacter lanceolatus =

Scientific classification
- Domain: Bacteria
- Kingdom: Pseudomonadati
- Phylum: Pseudomonadota
- Class: Betaproteobacteria
- Order: Burkholderiales
- Family: Comamonadaceae
- Genus: Curvibacter
- Species: C. lanceolatus

Binomial name
- Curvibacter lanceolatus Ding and Yokota 2004, comb. nov.

Type strain
- ATCC 14669, BCRC 15829, CCRC 15829, CCUG 48175, CFBP 5587, CIP 103297, IAM 14947, JCM 21429, Leifson 192, LMG 21631, NBRC 103051, NCIB 9461, NCIMB 9461

Species of bacterium

Curvibacter lanceolatus is a Gram-negative, nonmotile, non-spore-forming bacterium from the genus Curvibacter and family Comamonadaceae, which was isolated from well water. Colonies of C. lanceolatus are yellow–brown in color.
