= Roseateles aquatilis =

Scientific classification
- Domain: Bacteria
- Kingdom: Pseudomonadati
- Phylum: Pseudomonadota
- Class: Betaproteobacteria
- Order: Burkholderiales
- Family: Comamonadaceae
- Genus: Roseateles
- Species: R. aquatilis

Binomial name
- Roseateles aquatilis Gomila et al. 2008

Type strain
- CCUG 48205, CECT 7248

Species of bacterium

Roseateles aquatilis is a Gram-negative, oxidase-positive, catalase-negative, aerobic, rod-shaped bacterium with a single polar flagellum from the genus Roseateles, which was isolated from industrial water and fresh water. Colonies of R. aquatilis are clear.
