= 4-Sulfomuconolactone hydrolase =

Class of enzymes

4-sulfomuconolactone hydrolase

Identifiers
- EC no.: 3.1.1.92

Databases
- BRENDA: enzyme data
- ExPASy: NiceZyme view
- KEGG: enzyme entry
- MetaCyc: metabolic pathway
- Rhea: reactions
- PDB structures: RCSB PDB PDBe PDBsum
Search
- PMC: articles
- PubMed: articles
- NCBI: proteins

The enzyme 4-sulfomuconolactone hydrolase (EC 3.1.1.92; systematic name 4-sulfomuconolactone sulfohydrolase) catalyses the chemical reaction:

4-sulfomuconolactone
H_{2}O
H_{2}SO_{3}
maleylacetic acid

The enzyme characterised from Hydrogenophaga intermedia and Agrobacterium radiobacter S2 hydrolyses the 4-sulfomuconolactone to maleylacetic acid and sulfurous acid. The reaction is part of the degradation pathway for 3,4-dihydroxybenzenesulfonic acid in these bacteria. The bacterial co-culture is able to metabolise other compounds such as 4-aminobenzenesulfonic acid.
