= Diaphorobacter ruginosibacter =

Scientific classification
- Domain: Bacteria
- Kingdom: Pseudomonadati
- Phylum: Pseudomonadota
- Class: Betaproteobacteria
- Order: Burkholderiales
- Family: Comamonadaceae
- Genus: Diaphorobacter
- Species: D. ruginosibacter

Binomial name
- Diaphorobacter ruginosibacter Wei et al. 2015

Type strain
- ACCC 06116, DSM 27467, strain BN30

Species of bacterium

Diaphorobacter ruginosibacter is a Gram-negative and non-endospores-forming bacterium from the genus of Diaphorobacter which has been isolated from root nodule of soybean plant near Baoji in China.
