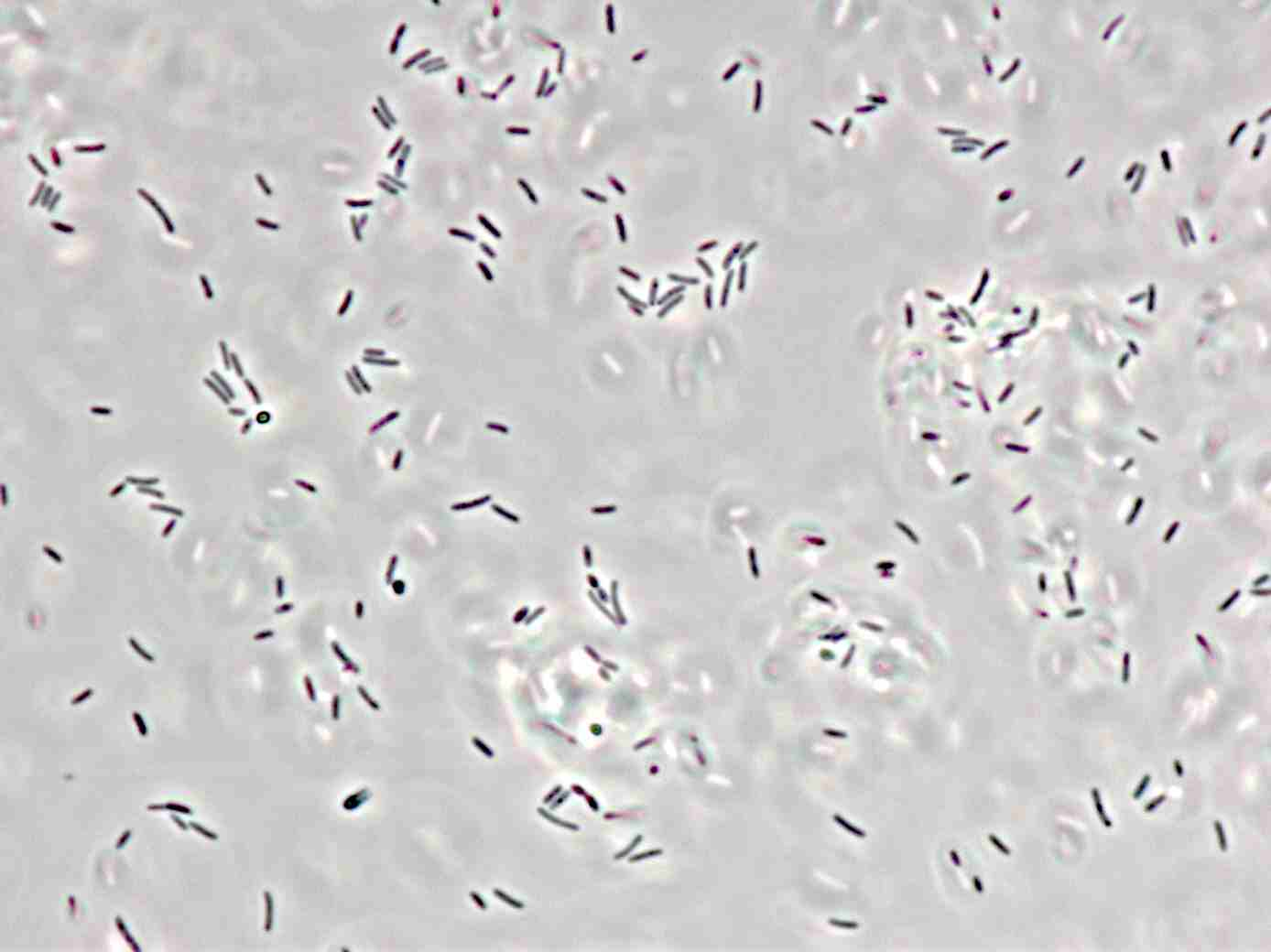

Scientific classification
- Domain: Bacteria
- Kingdom: Pseudomonadati
- Phylum: Pseudomonadota
- Class: Betaproteobacteria
- Order: Burkholderiales
- Family: Comamonadaceae
- Genus: Aquabacterium
- Species: A. fontiphilum

Binomial name
- Aquabacterium fontiphilum Lin et al. 2009, sp. nov.

Type strain
- BCRC 17729, Chen CS-6, CS-6, LMG 24215

= Aquabacterium fontiphilum =

Species of bacterium

Aquabacterium fontiphilum is a Gram-negative non-spore-forming, motile bacterium of the genus Aquabacterium in the family Comamonadaceae, which was isolated from a water sample from the Nature Valley in Hsinchu County in Taiwan. Aquabacterium fontiphilum has a single polar flagellum and its colonies are semitransparent.
