= Acidovorax radicis =

Scientific classification
- Domain: Bacteria
- Kingdom: Pseudomonadati
- Phylum: Pseudomonadota
- Class: Betaproteobacteria
- Order: Burkholderiales
- Family: Comamonadaceae
- Genus: Acidovorax
- Species: A. radicis

Binomial name
- Acidovorax radicis Li et al. 2011, sp. nov.

Type strain
- DSM 23535, LMG 25767, N35

Species of bacterium

Acidovorax radicis is a gram-negative, oxidase-positive, catalase-negative, motile, aerobic bacterium from the family Comamonadaceae which was isolated from the surface of sterilized wheat roots. In opposite to other Acidovorax species it has no phytopathogenic potential, moreover it has been shown that it promote plants growing activity.
