= Caldimonas taiwanensis =

Scientific classification
- Domain: Bacteria
- Kingdom: Pseudomonadati
- Phylum: Pseudomonadota
- Class: Betaproteobacteria
- Order: Burkholderiales
- Family: Comamonadaceae
- Genus: Caldimonas
- Species: C. taiwanensis

Binomial name
- Caldimonas taiwanensis Chen et al. 2005

Type strain
- BCRC 17405, CCRC 17405, LMG 22827, On1

Species of bacterium

Caldimonas taiwanensis is a bacterium from the genus Caldimonas which has been isolated from a hot spring in Taiwan. Caldimonas taiwanensis produces amylase.
