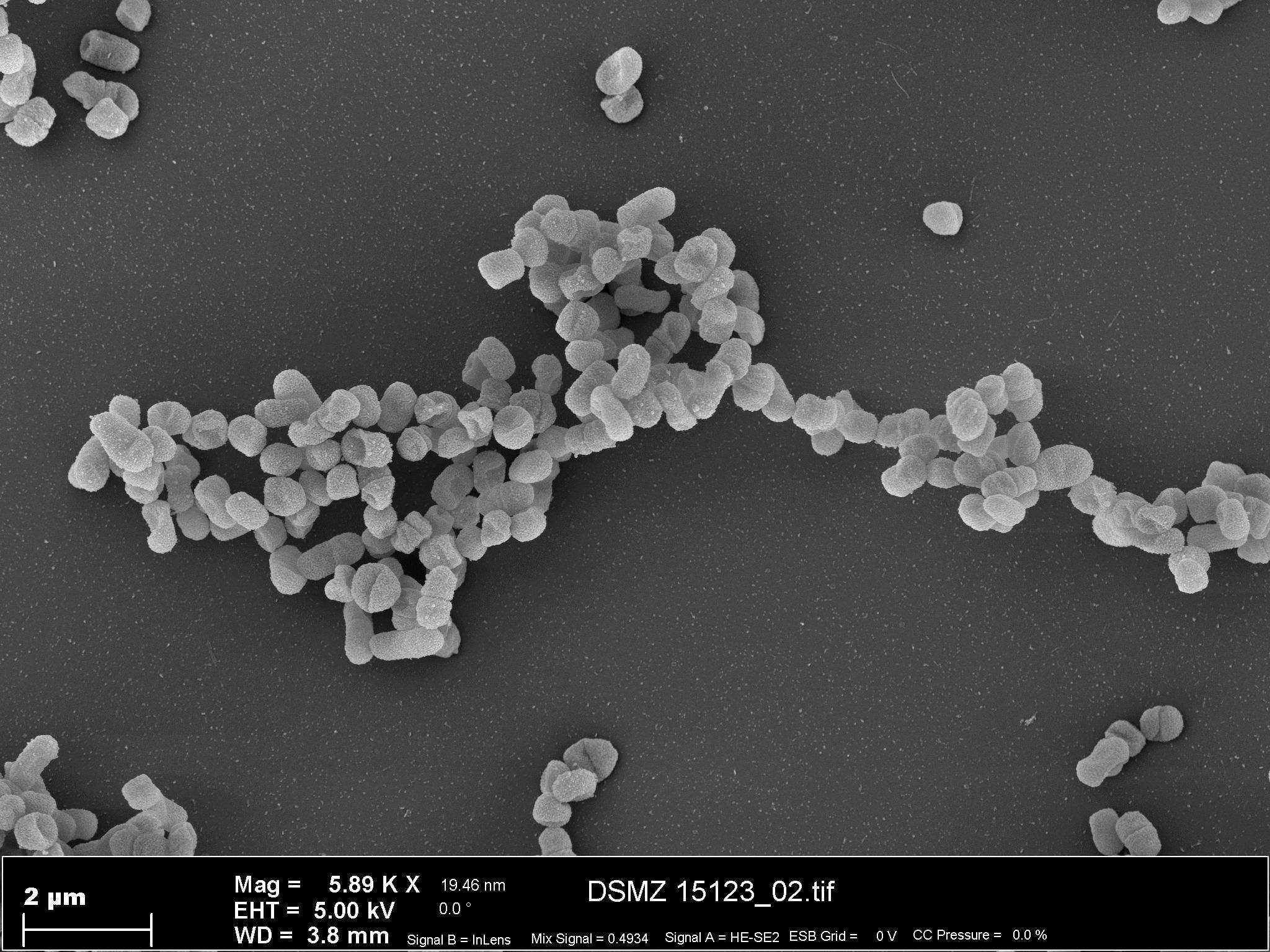
- Brachymonas denitrificans magnified to about 5890 times

Scientific classification
- Domain: Bacteria
- Kingdom: Pseudomonadati
- Phylum: Pseudomonadota
- Class: Betaproteobacteria
- Order: Burkholderiales
- Family: Comamonadaceae
- Genus: Brachymonas
- Species: B. denitrificans

Binomial name
- Brachymonas denitrificans Hiraishi et al. 1995

Type strain
- AS-P1, CCUG 45365, DSM 15123, Hiraishi AS-P1, JCM 9216

= Brachymonas denitrificans =

Species of bacterium

Brachymonas denitrificans is a nonmotile, Gram-negative, aerobic, chemo-organotrophic bacterium from the genus Brachymonas and family Comamonadaceae. B. denitrificans has no flagella and its colonies are cream to pale yellow.
