= Hydrogenophaga taeniospiralis =

Scientific classification
- Domain: Bacteria
- Kingdom: Pseudomonadati
- Phylum: Pseudomonadota
- Class: Betaproteobacteria
- Order: Burkholderiales
- Family: Comamonadaceae
- Genus: Hydrogenophaga
- Species: H. taeniospiralis

Binomial name
- Hydrogenophaga taeniospiralis (Lalucat et al., 1982) Willems et al., 1989

Type strain
- 2K1; ATCC 49743; CCUG 15921; CIP 106727; DSM 2082; JCM 21411; LMG 7170; NBRC 102512

Synonyms
- Pseudomonas taeniospiralis Lalucat et al., 1982

Species of bacterium

Hydrogenophaga taeniospiralis is a catalase-negative bacterium from the Comamonadaceae family.
