= Variovorax soli =

Scientific classification
- Domain: Bacteria
- Kingdom: Pseudomonadati
- Phylum: Pseudomonadota
- Class: Betaproteobacteria
- Order: Burkholderiales
- Family: Comamonadaceae
- Genus: Variovorax
- Species: V. soli

Binomial name
- Variovorax soli Kim et al. 2006

Type strain
- DSM 18216, GH9-3, KACC 11579

Species of bacterium

Variovorax soli is a Gram-negative, catalase- and oxidase-positive, rod-shaped, non-spore-forming, motile bacterium from the genus Variovorax, which was isolated from greenhouse soil. Colonies of Variovorax soli are light yellow in color.
