= Hydrogenophaga luteola =

Scientific classification
- Domain: Bacteria
- Kingdom: Pseudomonadati
- Phylum: Pseudomonadota
- Class: Betaproteobacteria
- Order: Burkholderiales
- Family: Comamonadaceae
- Genus: Hydrogenophaga
- Species: H. luteola

Binomial name
- Hydrogenophaga luteola Du et al. 2015

Type strain
- CCTCC AB 2014314, THG-SQE7, JCM 30433, KCTC 42501

Species of bacterium

Hydrogenophaga luteola is a bacterium from the genus of Hydrogenophaga which has been isolated from pond water from Shangqiu in China.
