= Acidovorax aerodenitrificans =

Scientific classification
- Domain: Bacteria
- Kingdom: Pseudomonadati
- Phylum: Pseudomonadota
- Class: Betaproteobacteria
- Order: Burkholderiales
- Family: Comamonadaceae
- Genus: Acidovorax
- Species: A. aerodenitrificans

Binomial name
- Acidovorax aerodenitrificans

Species of bacterium

Acidovorax aerodenitrificans is a bacterium from the genus of Acidovorax and the family of Comamonadaceae.
