= Rhodoferax fermentans =

Scientific classification
- Domain: Bacteria
- Kingdom: Pseudomonadati
- Phylum: Pseudomonadota
- Class: Betaproteobacteria
- Order: Burkholderiales
- Family: Comamonadaceae
- Genus: Rhodoferax
- Species: R. fermentans

Binomial name
- Rhodoferax fermentans Hiraishi et al. 1992

Type strain
- ATCC 49787, CCUG 45364, DSM 10138, FR2, Hiraishi FR2, IFO 16659, JCM 7819, NBRC 16659

Species of bacterium

Rhodoferax fermentans is a psychrophilic, motile bacterium from the genus Rhodoferax. It is a photosynthetic bacteria.
