= Hydrogenophaga soli =

Scientific classification
- Domain: Bacteria
- Kingdom: Pseudomonadati
- Phylum: Pseudomonadota
- Class: Betaproteobacteria
- Order: Burkholderiales
- Family: Comamonadaceae
- Genus: Hydrogenophaga
- Species: H. soli

Binomial name
- Hydrogenophaga soli Yang et al. 2017

Type strain
- JCM 31711, KCTC 52520, strain S10

Species of bacterium

Hydrogenophaga soli is a Gram-negative, rod-shaped, strictly aerobic and motile bacterium from the genus of Hydrogenophaga which has been isolated from soil from a rice field from Goyang in Korea.
