= Caldimonas hydrothermale =

Scientific classification
- Domain: Bacteria
- Kingdom: Pseudomonadati
- Phylum: Pseudomonadota
- Class: Betaproteobacteria
- Order: Burkholderiales
- Family: Comamonadaceae
- Genus: Caldimonas
- Species: C. hydrothermale

Binomial name
- Caldimonas hydrothermale Bouraoui et al. 2010

Type strain
- HAN-85, DSM 18497, LMG 23755

Species of bacterium

Caldimonas hydrothermale is a Gram negative, thermophilic and motile bacterium from the genus Caldimonas with a single polar flagellum which has been isolated from a natural thermal spring in Tozeur in Tunisia.
