= Ottowia shaoguanensis =

Scientific classification
- Domain: Bacteria
- Kingdom: Pseudomonadati
- Phylum: Pseudomonadota
- Class: Betaproteobacteria
- Order: Burkholderiales
- Family: Comamonadaceae
- Genus: Ottowia
- Species: O. shaoguanensis

Binomial name
- Ottowia shaoguanensis Geng et al. 2014

Type strain
- CGMCC 1.12431, LMG 27408, strain J5-66

Species of bacterium

Ottowia shaoguanensis is a Gram-negative and short rod-shaped bacterium from the genus Ottowia which has been isolated from wastewater from Shaoguan in China.
