= Ottowia beijingensis =

Scientific classification
- Domain: Bacteria
- Kingdom: Pseudomonadati
- Phylum: Pseudomonadota
- Class: Betaproteobacteria
- Order: Burkholderiales
- Family: Comamonadaceae
- Genus: Ottowia
- Species: O. beijingensis

Binomial name
- Ottowia beijingensis Cao et al. 2014

Type strain
- CGMCC 1.12324, LMG 27179, MCCC 1A01410, strain GCS-AN-3

Species of bacterium

Ottowia beijingensis is a Gram-negative bacterium from the genus Ottowia. It has been isolated from activated sludge from Beijing in China.
