= Brachymonas =

Brachymonas is the genus name of:

- Brachymonas (bacterium), a genus of gram-negative bacteria in the order Burkholderiales
- Brachymonas (protist), a genus of protists in the order Oxymonadida
