= Aquabacterium =

Comamonadaceae

Scientific classification
- Domain: Bacteria
- Kingdom: Pseudomonadati
- Phylum: Pseudomonadota
- Class: Betaproteobacteria
- Order: Burkholderiales
- Family: Comamonadaceae
- Genus: Aquabacterium; Kalmbach et al. 1999, gen. nov

Type species
- Aquabacterium commune

Species
- Aquabacterium citratiphilum Aquabacterium commune Aquabacterium fontiphilum Aquabacterium limnoticum Aquabacterium olei Aquabacterium hongkongensis Aquabacterium parvum

Genus of bacteria

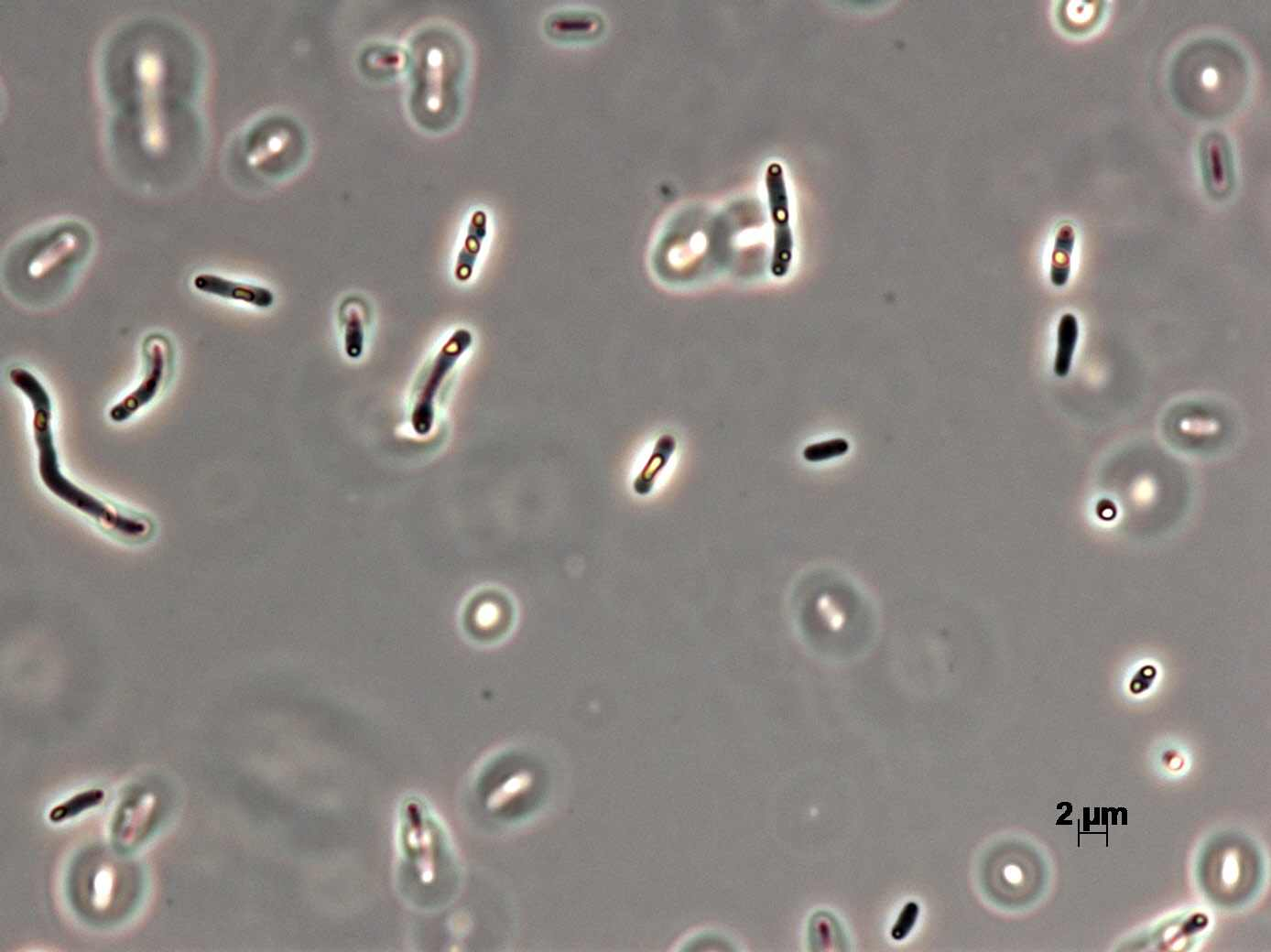
Aquabacterium limnoticum

The species of the genus Aquabacterium are motile, rod-shaped, Gram-negative, oxidase-positive, catalase-negative bacteria which were isolated from drinking water biofilms in Berlin. Identified species include Aquabacterium citratiphilum, Aquabacterium parvum, and Aquabacterium commune. Three bacterial strains isolated from biofilms of the Berlin drinking water system were characterized with respect to their morphological and physiological properties and their taxonomic position. Phenotypically, the bacteria investigated were motile, Gram-negative rods, oxidase-positive and catalase-negative, and contained polyalkanoates and polyphosphate as storage polymers. They displayed a microaerophilic growth behaviour and used oxygen and nitrate as electron acceptors, but not nitrite, chlorate, sulfate, or ferric iron. The substrates metabolized included a broad range of organic acids, but no carbohydrates at all. The three species can be distinguished from each other by their substrate use, ability to hydrolyse urea and casein, cellular protein patterns, and growth on nutrient-rich media, as well as their temperature, pH, and NaCl tolerances. Phylogenetic analysis, based on 16S rRNA gene sequence comparison, revealed that the isolates are affiliated to the beta 1-subclass of Proteobacteria. The isolates constitute three new species with internal levels of DNA relatedness ranging from 44.9 to 51.3%. It is proposed that a new genus, Aquabacterium gen. nov., should be created, including Aquabacterium citratiphilum sp. nov., Aquabacterium parvum sp. nov., and Aquabacterium commune sp. nov. The type species of the new genus is Aquabacterium commune.
