= Brachymonas chironomi =

Scientific classification
- Domain: Bacteria
- Kingdom: Pseudomonadati
- Phylum: Pseudomonadota
- Class: Betaproteobacteria
- Order: Burkholderiales
- Family: Comamonadaceae
- Genus: Brachymonas
- Species: B. chironomi

Binomial name
- Brachymonas chironomi Halpern et al. 2009

Type strain
- AIMA4, DSM 19884, Halpern AImA4, LMG 24400

Species of bacterium

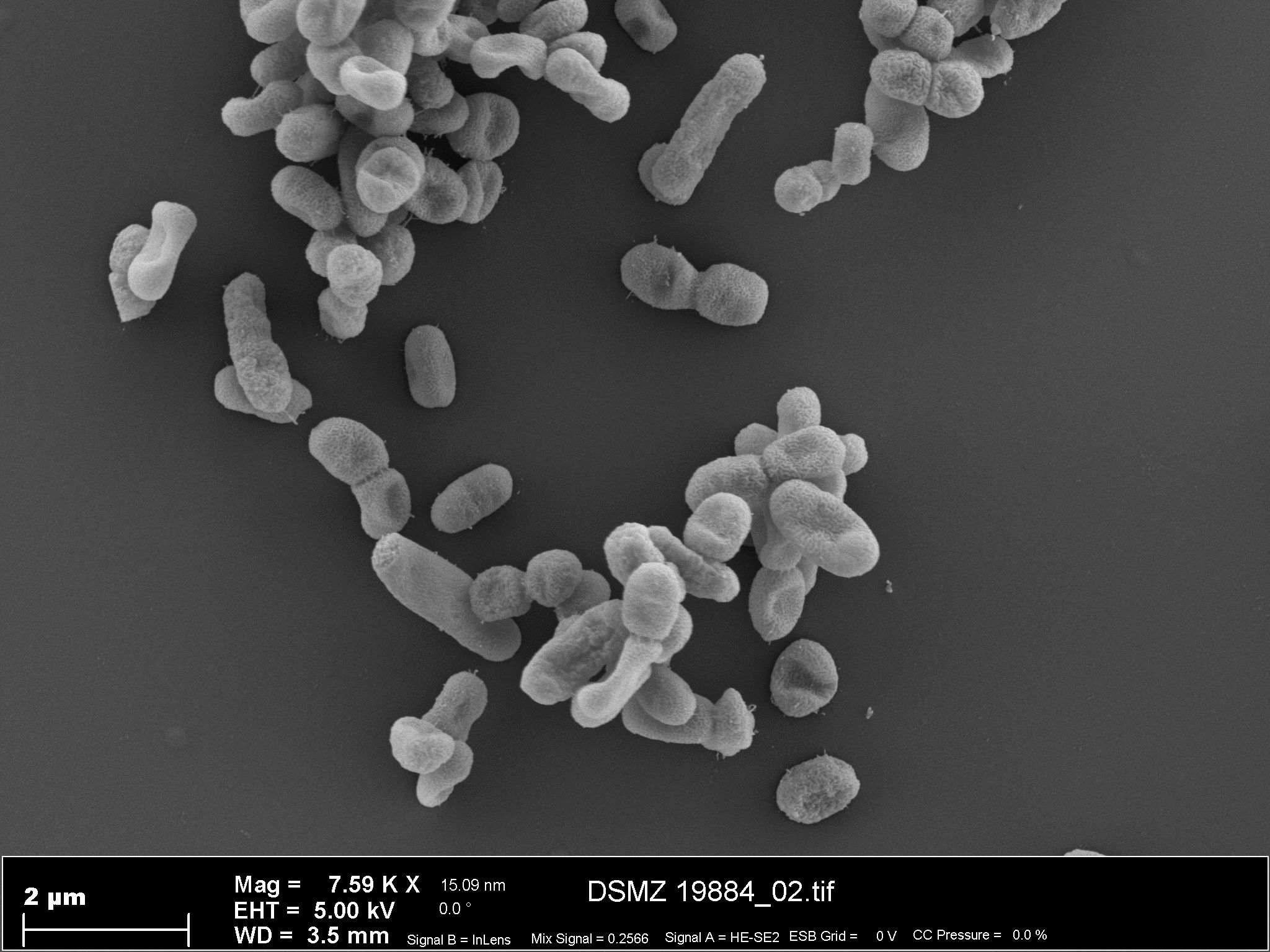
Brachymonas chironomi

Brachymonas chironomi is a Gram-negative, nonmotile, aerobic, oxidase-positive, catalase-positive, chemo-organotrophic bacterium from the genus Brachymonas and family Comamonadaceae, which was isolated from a chironomid egg mass in Israel. Brachymonas chironomi occur as single cells ore as pairs and sometimes as chains. The colony color of B. chironomi is beige and changes after a few days into brown-beige.
