= Curvibacter fontanus =

Scientific classification
- Domain: Bacteria
- Kingdom: Pseudomonadati
- Phylum: Pseudomonadota
- Class: Betaproteobacteria
- Order: Burkholderiales
- Family: Comamonadaceae
- Genus: Curvibacter
- Species: C. fontanus

Binomial name
- Curvibacter fontanus Ding and Yokota 2010, sp. nov.

Type strain
- AQ9T, ATCC BAA-873, CCTCC AB 206021, CCUG 49444, IAM 15072, JCM 21533

Species of bacterium

Curvibacter fontanus is a bacterium from the genus Curvibacter and family Comamonadaceae, which was isolated from well water.
