= Tepidimonas ignava =

Scientific classification
- Domain: Bacteria
- Kingdom: Pseudomonadati
- Phylum: Pseudomonadota
- Class: Betaproteobacteria
- Order: Burkholderiales
- Family: Comamonadaceae
- Genus: Tepidimonas
- Species: T. ignava

Binomial name
- Tepidimonas ignava Moreira et al. 2000

Type strain
- BCRC 17574, CCRC 17574, DSM 12034, SPS-1037

Species of bacterium

Tepidimonas ignava is a gram-negative, slightly thermophilic, motile bacterium with a single polar flagellum from the genus Tepidimonas, which was isolated from the hot spring at São Pedro do Sul in central Portugal.
