= Acidovorax temperans =

Scientific classification
- Domain: Bacteria
- Kingdom: Pseudomonadati
- Phylum: Pseudomonadota
- Class: Betaproteobacteria
- Order: Burkholderiales
- Family: Comamonadaceae
- Genus: Acidovorax
- Species: A. temperans

Binomial name
- Acidovorax temperans Willems et al. 1990

Species of bacterium

Acidovorax temperans is a Gram-negative bacterium.
