= Hydrogenophaga caeni =

Scientific classification
- Domain: Bacteria
- Kingdom: Pseudomonadati
- Phylum: Pseudomonadota
- Class: Betaproteobacteria
- Order: Burkholderiales
- Family: Comamonadaceae
- Genus: Hydrogenophaga
- Species: H. caeni

Binomial name
- Hydrogenophaga caeni Chung et al. 2007, sp. nov.

Type strain
- DSM 17962, EMB71, KCTC 12613

Species of bacterium

Hydrogenophaga caeni is a Gram-negative, anaerobic, catalase- and oxidase-positive, motile bacterium from the Comamonadaceae family, with a single polar flagellum, which was isolated from an activated sludge. Colonies of H. caeni are white colored.
