= R. terrae =

R. terrae may refer to:

- Roseateles terrae, a species of Gram negative bacteria
- Roseomonas terrae, a species of Gram negative bacteria
