= Polaromonas jejuensis =

Scientific classification
- Domain: Bacteria
- Kingdom: Pseudomonadati
- Phylum: Pseudomonadota
- Class: Betaproteobacteria
- Order: Burkholderiales
- Family: Comamonadaceae
- Genus: Polaromonas
- Species: P. jejuensis

Binomial name
- Polaromonas jejuensis Weon et al. 2008

Type strain
- DSM 19351, JS12-13, KACC 12508

Species of bacterium

Polaromonas jejuensis is a bacterial strain of the genus Polaromonas. It was discovered in soil samples isolated from Halla Mountain on Jeju Island, Republic of Korea.

The bacteria is aerobic and Gram-negative. It neither moves independently using metabolic energy nor forms spores. Characteristics also include the formation of rods 0.6 μm wide and 1–3 μm long. Its colonies are pale yellow.
