= Roseateles depolymerans =

Scientific classification
- Domain: Bacteria
- Kingdom: Pseudomonadati
- Phylum: Pseudomonadota
- Class: Betaproteobacteria
- Order: Burkholderiales
- Family: Comamonadaceae
- Genus: Roseateles
- Species: R. depolymerans

Binomial name
- Roseateles depolymerans Suyama et al. 1999

Type strain
- CCUG 48747, CCUG 52219, DSM 11813, NCIMB 13588

Species of bacterium

Roseateles depolymerans is an aerobic photosynthetic bacterium from the genus Roseateles, which was isolated from river water (Hanamuro River, Tsukuba, Japan).

R. depolymerans is a bacteriochlorophyll a-containing obligate aerobe in the β-subclass of the Proteobacteria. The cells are motile, straight rods, and they contain poly-β-hydroxybutyrate granules.

R. depolymerans is characterised by the ability to biodegrade the material poly(hexamethylene carbonate) (PHC), and some other biodegradable plastics.
