= Ottowia pentelensis =

Ottowia beijingensis

Scientific classification
- Domain: Bacteria
- Kingdom: Pseudomonadati
- Phylum: Pseudomonadota
- Class: Betaproteobacteria
- Order: Burkholderiales
- Family: Comamonadaceae
- Genus: Ottowia
- Species: O. beijingensis

Binomial name
- Ottowia beijingensis Felföldi et al. 2011

Type strain
- DSM 21699, NCAIM B 02336, strain RB3-7

Species of bacterium

Ottowia beijingensis is a Gram-staining and short rod-shaped bacterium from the genus Ottowia which has been isolated from activated sludge from Budapest in Hungary.
