= Limnohabitans curvus =

Scientific classification
- Domain: Bacteria
- Kingdom: Pseudomonadati
- Phylum: Pseudomonadota
- Class: Betaproteobacteria
- Order: Burkholderiales
- Family: Comamonadaceae
- Genus: Limnohabitans
- Species: L. curvus

Binomial name
- Limnohabitans curvus Hahn et al. 2010

Type strain
- MWH-C5T

Species of bacterium

Limnohabitans curvus is an aerobic, nonmotile bacterium from the genus Limnohabitans and family Comamonadaceae, which was isolated from the pelagic zone from a freshwater lake in Mondsee in Austria.
