= Giesbergeria voronezhensis =

Scientific classification
- Domain: Bacteria
- Kingdom: Pseudomonadati
- Phylum: Pseudomonadota
- Class: Betaproteobacteria
- Order: Burkholderiales
- Family: Comamonadaceae
- Genus: Giesbergeria
- Species: G. voronezhensis

Binomial name
- Giesbergeria voronezhensis Grabovich et al. 2006

Type strain
- CIP 107340, DSM 12825, VKM B-2350, strain D-419

Species of bacterium

Giesbergeria voronezhensis is a Gram-negative, spiral-shaped and motile bacterium from the genus of Giesbergeria which has been isolated from activated sludge from Voronezh in Russia.
