= Variovorax boronicumulans =

Scientific classification
- Domain: Bacteria
- Kingdom: Pseudomonadati
- Phylum: Pseudomonadota
- Class: Betaproteobacteria
- Order: Burkholderiales
- Family: Comamonadaceae
- Genus: Variovorax
- Species: V. boronicumulans

Binomial name
- Variovorax boronicumulans Miwa et al. 2008

Type strain
- BAM-48 (=NBRC 103145 =KCTC 22010)

Species of bacterium

Variovorax boronicumulans is a Gram-negative, catalase- and oxidase-positive, non-spore-forming, rod-shaped, motile bacterium from the genus Variovorax. Colonies of V. boronicumulans are yellow in color.
