= Diaphorobacter polyhydroxybutyrativorans =

Scientific classification
- Domain: Bacteria
- Kingdom: Pseudomonadati
- Phylum: Pseudomonadota
- Class: Betaproteobacteria
- Order: Burkholderiales
- Family: Comamonadaceae
- Genus: Diaphorobacter
- Species: D. polyhydroxybutyrativorans

Binomial name
- Diaphorobacter polyhydroxybutyrativorans Qiu et al. 2015

Type strain
- ACCC 19739, DSM 29460, strain SL-205

Species of bacterium

Diaphorobacter polyhydroxybutyrativorans is a Gram-negative, facultatively aerobic and rod-shaped bacterium from the genus Diaphorobacter which has been isolated from biofilm from a denitrifying reactor in Beijing in China. Diaphorobacter polyhydroxybutyrativorans has the ability to degrade poly(3-hydroxybutyrate-co-3-hydroxyvalerate).
