= Tepidimonas fonticaldi =

Scientific classification
- Domain: Bacteria
- Kingdom: Pseudomonadati
- Phylum: Pseudomonadota
- Class: Betaproteobacteria
- Order: Burkholderiales
- Family: Comamonadaceae
- Genus: Tepidimonas
- Species: T. fonticaldi

Binomial name
- Tepidimonas fonticaldi Chen et al. 2013

Type strain
- AT-A2 = BCRC 80391 = KCTC 23862 = LMG 26746

Species of bacterium

Tepidimonas fonticaldi is a Gram-negative, thermophilic, motile bacterium with a single polar flagellum from the genus Tepidimonas, which was isolated from a hot spring water sample from the Antun hot spring in Taiwan.
