= Variovorax humicola =

Scientific classification
- Domain: Bacteria
- Kingdom: Pseudomonadati
- Phylum: Pseudomonadota
- Class: Betaproteobacteria
- Order: Burkholderiales
- Family: Comamonadaceae
- Genus: Variovorax
- Species: V. humicola

Binomial name
- Variovorax humicola Nguyen and Kim 2016

Type strain
- KACC 18501, NBRC 111520, UC10, UC38

Species of bacterium

Variovorax humicola is a Gram-negative, non-spore-forming, rod-shaped and motile bacterium from the genus of Variovorax which has been isolated from forest soil near the Kyonggi University from Suwon in Korea.
