= Polaromonas naphthalenivorans =

Scientific classification
- Domain: Bacteria
- Kingdom: Pseudomonadati
- Phylum: Pseudomonadota
- Class: Betaproteobacteria
- Order: Burkholderiales
- Family: Comamonadaceae
- Genus: Polaromonas
- Species: P. naphthalenivorans

Binomial name
- Polaromonas naphthalenivorans Jeon et al. 2004

Type strain
- ATCC BAA-779, CCUG 51246, CJ2, DSM 15660

Species of bacterium

Polaromonas naphthalenivorans is a Gram-negative, oxidase- and catalase-positive, non-spore-forming, nonmotile bacterium from the genus Polaromonas, which was isolated from coal-tar contaminated freshwater sediment. P. naphthalenivorans has the ability to degrade naphthalene. Its colonies have a smooth and glistening surface.
