= Acidovorax oryzae =

Scientific classification
- Domain: Bacteria
- Kingdom: Pseudomonadati
- Phylum: Pseudomonadota
- Class: Betaproteobacteria
- Order: Burkholderiales
- Family: Comamonadaceae
- Genus: Acidovorax
- Species: A. oryzae

Binomial name
- Acidovorax oryzae Schaad et al. 2009, sp. nov.

Type strain
- ATCC 19882, CCUG 15836, CFBP 2426, CIP 106433, Dye MS1, FC-143, ICMP 3960, ICPB 30003, ICPB PS177, ICPB PSS177, LMG 10904, LMG 1806, NCPPB 1392

Species of bacterium

Acidovorax oryzae is a bacterium from the Comamonadaceae family which is closely related to Acidovorax citrulli. Acidovorax oryzae was reclassificated from the former name Acidovorax avenae subsp. avenae. It has been shown that Acidovorax oryzae is serious pathogen fore rice (Oryza sativa).

== Etymology ==
A. oryzae comes from the Latin genus "oryzae" which means rice. A.oryzae is causal agent of bacterial brown stripe on rice.
