= Brachymonas petroleovorans =

Scientific classification
- Domain: Bacteria
- Kingdom: Pseudomonadati
- Phylum: Pseudomonadota
- Class: Betaproteobacteria
- Order: Burkholderiales
- Family: Comamonadaceae
- Genus: Brachymonas
- Species: B. petroleovorans

Binomial name
- Brachymonas petroleovorans Rouviere and Chen 2003

Species of bacterium

Brachymonas petroleovorans is a Gram-negative, aerobic bacterium belonging to the genus Brachymonas and the family Comamonadaceae. It was isolated from a wastewater treatment plant of a petroleum refinery. B. petroleovorans has the capability to degrade cyclohexane and aromatic compounds such as toluene and m-cresol.
