= Variovorax defluvii =

Scientific classification
- Domain: Bacteria
- Kingdom: Pseudomonadati
- Phylum: Pseudomonadota
- Class: Betaproteobacteria
- Order: Burkholderiales
- Family: Comamonadaceae
- Genus: Variovorax
- Species: V. defluvii

Binomial name
- Variovorax defluvii Jin et al. 2012

Type strain
- 2C1-b, JCM 17804, KCTC 12768

Species of bacterium

Variovorax defluvii is a Gram-negative, non-spore-forming, motile bacterium from the genus Variovorax, which was isolated from the sewage in the Geumho River in Korea.
