= Hydrogenophaga atypica =

Scientific classification
- Domain: Bacteria
- Kingdom: Pseudomonadati
- Phylum: Pseudomonadota
- Class: Betaproteobacteria
- Order: Burkholderiales
- Family: Comamonadaceae
- Genus: Hydrogenophaga
- Species: H. atypica

Binomial name
- Hydrogenophaga atypica Kämpfer et al. 2005, sp. nov.

Type strain
- BSB 41.8, CCUG 53902, CIP 108118, DSM 15342

Species of bacterium

Hydrogenophaga atypica is a Gram-negative, oxidase-positive, rod-shaped, motile bacterium from the Comamonadaceae family, which was isolated from wastewater from an activated sludge. The colonies of H. atypica are pale yellow.
