= Hydrogenophaga flava =

Scientific classification
- Domain: Bacteria
- Kingdom: Pseudomonadati
- Phylum: Pseudomonadota
- Class: Betaproteobacteria
- Order: Burkholderiales
- Family: Comamonadaceae
- Genus: Hydrogenophaga
- Species: H. flava

Binomial name
- Hydrogenophaga flava (Niklewski 1910); Willems et al. 1989

Type strain
- ATCC 33667 CCUG 1658; CCUG 22894; CFBP 2438; CIP 103271; DSM 619; JCM 21413; LMG 2185

Synonyms
- Pseudomonas flava (Niklewski 1910) Davis 1969; Hydrogenomonas flava Niklewski 1910

Species of bacterium

Hydrogenophaga flava is a species of Gram-negative, rod-shaped comamonad bacteria.
