= Polaromonas hydrogenivorans =

Scientific classification
- Domain: Bacteria
- Kingdom: Pseudomonadati
- Phylum: Pseudomonadota
- Class: Betaproteobacteria
- Order: Burkholderiales
- Family: Comamonadaceae
- Genus: Polaromonas
- Species: P. hydrogenivorans

Binomial name
- Polaromonas hydrogenivorans Sizova and Panikov 2007

Type strain
- DSM 17735, NRRL B-41369, VKM B-2398

Species of bacterium

Polaromonas hydrogenivorans is a Gram-negative, nonmotile, non-spore-forming, psychrotolerant bacterium from the genus Polaromonas, which was isolated from Alaskan forest soil. P. hydrogenivorans has the ability to oxidize hydrogen and its colonies are white.
