= Acidovorax valerianellae =

Scientific classification
- Domain: Bacteria
- Kingdom: Pseudomonadati
- Phylum: Pseudomonadota
- Class: Betaproteobacteria
- Order: Burkholderiales
- Family: Comamonadaceae
- Genus: Acidovorax
- Species: A. valerianellae

Binomial name
- Acidovorax valerianellae Gardan et al. 2003

Species of bacterium

Acidovorax valerianellae is a Gram-negative bacterium.
