= Hydrogenophaga bisanensis =

Scientific classification
- Domain: Bacteria
- Kingdom: Pseudomonadati
- Phylum: Pseudomonadota
- Class: Betaproteobacteria
- Order: Burkholderiales
- Family: Comamonadaceae
- Genus: Hydrogenophaga
- Species: H. bisanensis

Binomial name
- Hydrogenophaga bisanensis Yoon et al. 2008, sp. nov.

Type strain
- CCUG 54518, K102, KCTC 12980

Species of bacterium

Hydrogenophaga bisanensis is a Gram-negative, non-spore-forming, rod-shaped bacterium from the Comamonadaceae family, which was isolated from wastewater from a textile dye works in Korea. Colonies of H. bisanensis are moderate yellow in color.
