= Hydrogenophaga crassostreae =

Scientific classification
- Domain: Bacteria
- Kingdom: Pseudomonadati
- Phylum: Pseudomonadota
- Class: Betaproteobacteria
- Order: Burkholderiales
- Family: Comamonadaceae
- Genus: Hydrogenophaga
- Species: H. crassostreae

Binomial name
- Hydrogenophaga crassostreae Baek et al. 2017

Type strain
- JCM 31188, KACC 18705, strain LPB0072

Species of bacterium

Hydrogenophaga crassostreae is a Gram-negative, rod-shaped, aerobic and motile bacterium from the genus of Hydrogenophaga which has been isolated from the oyster Crassostrea gigas.
