= Hydrogenophaga laconesensis =

Scientific classification
- Domain: Bacteria
- Kingdom: Pseudomonadati
- Phylum: Pseudomonadota
- Class: Betaproteobacteria
- Order: Burkholderiales
- Family: Comamonadaceae
- Genus: Hydrogenophaga
- Species: H. laconesensis

Binomial name
- Hydrogenophaga laconesensis Mantri et al. 2017

Type strain
- KTCC 42478, LMG 28681, strain HWB-10

Species of bacterium

Hydrogenophaga laconesensis is a Gram-negative, non-spore-forming and motile bacterium from the genus of Hydrogenophaga which has been isolated from well water.
