= Acidovorax caeni =

Scientific classification
- Domain: Bacteria
- Kingdom: Pseudomonadati
- Phylum: Pseudomonadota
- Class: Betaproteobacteria
- Order: Burkholderiales
- Family: Comamonadaceae
- Genus: Acidovorax
- Species: A. caeni

Binomial name
- Acidovorax caeni Heylen et al. 2008, sp. nov.

Type strain
- DSM 19327, Heylen R-24608, LMG 24103, R-24608

Species of bacterium

Acidovorax caeni is a gram-negative, catalase- and oxidase-positive, rod-shaped bacterium from the Comamonadaceae family that was isolated from the activated sludge of a wastewater treatment plant in Belgium. Colonies are yellow–brown.
