= Acidovorax cattleyae =

Scientific classification
- Domain: Bacteria
- Kingdom: Pseudomonadati
- Phylum: Pseudomonadota
- Class: Betaproteobacteria
- Order: Burkholderiales
- Family: Comamonadaceae
- Genus: Acidovorax
- Species: A. cattleyae

Binomial name
- Acidovorax cattleyae (Pavarino 1911) Schaad et al. 2009, comb. nov

Type strain
- ATCC 33619, BCRC 13202, CCRC 13202, CCUG 21975, CFBP 2423, CIP 106435, DSM 17101, Dye NL1, FC-507, IBSBF 209, ICMP 2826, ICPB 30134, ICPB PC21, KACC 10650, LMG 2364, LMG 5286, NCPPB 961, NRRL B-835, NZRCC 10252, PC 21, PDDCC 2826, strain Ark

Synonyms
- Acidovorax avenae subsp. cattleyae; Bacterium cattleyae; Pseudomonas cattleyae

Species of bacterium

Acidovorax cattleyae is a bacterium from the family Comamonadaceae which causes brown spots on orchids.
