= PHC =

PHC or PhC may refer to:

== Education ==
- Candidate of Philosophy (Candidatus/Candidata Philosophiae), an academic degree
- Patrick Henry College, a college in Purcellville, Virginia, US
- Pacific Harbors Council, of Scouting in Washington, US

== Health care ==
- Hawaii Prepaid Health Care Act
- Partnership HealthPlan of California, a Medicaid health plan
- Philippine Heart Center, hospital for heart illnesses in the Philippines
- Primary health care, essential health care
- Primary health centre, the basic structural and functional unit of the public health services in developing countries
  - Primary Health Centre (India)

== Religion ==
- Pentecostal Holiness Church
- Perth Hebrew Congregation, of Menora, Western Australia

== Science and technology ==
- Password Hashing Competition, a former competition
- Polyhalogenated compound
- Poly(hexamethylene carbonate)
- Poly(hydridocarbyne)
- Potentially hazardous comet
- Sanyo PHC, a family of personal computers

== Other uses ==
- A Prairie Home Companion, a radio show on American Public Media
- Post-hardcore, a subgenre of hardcore music
- Peshawar High Court, Pakistan
- Port Harcourt International Airport (IATA code), Nigeria
