= Caenimonas terrae =

Scientific classification
- Domain: Bacteria
- Kingdom: Pseudomonadati
- Phylum: Pseudomonadota
- Class: Betaproteobacteria
- Order: Burkholderiales
- Family: Comamonadaceae
- Genus: Caenimonas
- Species: C. terrae

Binomial name
- Caenimonas terrae Kim et al. 2013

Type strain
- KACC 13365, NBRC 106341, SGM1-15

Species of bacterium

Caenimonas terrae is a Gram-negative, strictly aerobic and curved rod-shaped bacterium from the genus of Caenimonas which has been isolated from soil from Suwon on Korea.
