= Limnohabitans planktonicus =

Scientific classification
- Domain: Bacteria
- Kingdom: Pseudomonadati
- Phylum: Pseudomonadota
- Class: Betaproteobacteria
- Order: Burkholderiales
- Family: Comamonadaceae
- Genus: Limnohabitans
- Species: L. planktonicus

Binomial name
- Limnohabitans planktonicus Kasalický et al. 2010

Type strain
- II-D5T (=DSM 21594T =CIP 109844T)

Species of bacterium

Limnohabitans planktonicus is a Gram-negative, oxidase- and catalase-positive, aerobic, unpigmented bacterium from the genus Limnohabitans, which was isolated from the mesoeutrophic freshwater reservoir in Římov in the Czech Republic.
