= Limnohabitans australis =

Scientific classification
- Domain: Bacteria
- Kingdom: Pseudomonadati
- Phylum: Pseudomonadota
- Class: Betaproteobacteria
- Order: Burkholderiales
- Family: Comamonadaceae
- Genus: Limnohabitans
- Species: L. australis

Binomial name
- Limnohabitans australis Hahn et al. 2010

Type strain
- MWH-BRAZ-DAM2D (=DSM 21646 = CCUG 56719)

Species of bacterium

Limnohabitans australis is an aerobic, nonmotile bacterium from the genus Limnohabitans and family Comamonadaceae, which was isolated from a freshwater pond in São Carlos, São Paulo state, Brazil.
