= Limnohabitans =

Scientific classification
- Domain: Bacteria
- Kingdom: Pseudomonadati
- Phylum: Pseudomonadota
- Class: Betaproteobacteria
- Order: Burkholderiales
- Family: Comamonadaceae
- Genus: Limnohabitans; Hahn et al. 2010

Type species
- Limnohabitans curvus

Species
- Limnohabitans australis Hahn et al.. 2010; Limnohabitans curvus Hahn et al. 2010; Limnohabitans parvus Kasalický et al.. 2011; Limnohabitans planktonicus Kasalický et al.. 2011

Genus of bacteria

Limnohabitans is a genus of bacteria established by Hahn et al. (2010). The genus contains four species which all represent planktonic bacteria dwelling in the water column of freshwater lakes, reservoirs, and streams.

== Genomics ==
Draft genome sequences of two strains most likely representing two undescribed Limnohabitans species were published.
