= Variovorax =

Scientific classification
- Domain: Bacteria
- Kingdom: Pseudomonadati
- Phylum: Pseudomonadota
- Class: Betaproteobacteria
- Order: Burkholderiales
- Family: Comamonadaceae
- Genus: Variovorax; Willems et al. 1991

Type species
- Variovorax paradoxus

Species
- V. boronicumulans V. defluvii V. dokdonensis V. durovernensis V. ginsengisoli V. gossypii V. guangxiensis V. humicola V. paradoxus V. soli

Genus of bacteria

Variovorax paradoxus EPS swarming time-lapse video, swarming on FW-succinate-NH4Cl medium, taken 18 h after inoculation, 2 h time lapse, 3 m between frames

Variovorax is a Gram-negative and motile genus of bacteria from the family Comamonadaceae. It belongs to the class called Betaproteobacteria. It is an aerobic bacteria and most of its species is found in soil and freshwater. The demographic distribution of this species is primarily in Europe, Asia and the Americas, as well as the polar regions. Its designated species is Variovorax paradoxus which arose from the species Alcaligenes paradoxus being grouped under the Variovorax genus. Variovorax paradoxus constitutes to the methylotrophic microbiota of the human mouth.
