= Polaromonas =

Scientific classification
- Domain: Bacteria
- Kingdom: Pseudomonadati
- Phylum: Pseudomonadota
- Class: Betaproteobacteria
- Order: Burkholderiales
- Family: Comamonadaceae
- Genus: Polaromonas

Type species
- Polaromonas vacuolata

Species
- Polaromonas aquatica Polaromonas cryoconiti Polaromonas glacialis Polaromonas hydrogenivorans Polaromonas jejuensis Polaromonas naphthalenivorans Polaromonas vacuolata

Genus of bacteria

Polaromonas is a genus of Gram-negative bacteria from the family Comamonadaceae. Polaromonas species are psychrophiles.
