= Rhodoferax =

Scientific classification
- Domain: Bacteria
- Kingdom: Pseudomonadati
- Phylum: Pseudomonadota
- Class: Betaproteobacteria
- Order: Burkholderiales
- Family: Comamonadaceae
- Genus: Rhodoferax; Hiraishi et al. 1992

Species
- Rhodoferax antarcticus; Rhodoferax fermentans; Rhodoferax ferrireducens; Rhodoferax saidenbachensis

Genus of bacteria

Rhodoferax is a genus of Betaproteobacteria belonging to the purple nonsulfur bacteria. Originally, Rhodoferax species were included in the genus Rhodocyclus as the Rhodocyclus gelatinous-like group. The genus Rhodoferax was first proposed in 1991 to accommodate the taxonomic and phylogenetic discrepancies arising from its inclusion in the genus Rhodocyclus. Rhodoferax currently comprises four described species: R. fermentans, R. antarcticus, R. ferrireducens, and R. saidenbachensis. R. ferrireducens, lacks the typical phototrophic character common to two other Rhodoferax species. This difference has led researchers to propose the creation of a new genus, Albidoferax, to accommodate this divergent species. The genus name was later corrected to Albidiferax. Based on geno- and phenotypical characteristics, A. ferrireducens was reclassified in the genus Rhodoferax in 2014. R. saidenbachensis, a second non-phototrophic species of the genus Rhodoferax was described by Kaden et al. in 2014.

== Taxonomy ==
Rhodoferax species are Gram-negative rods, ranging in diameter from 0.5 to 0.9 μm with a single polar flagellum. The first two species described for the genus, R. fermentans and R. antarcticus, are facultative photoheterotrophs that can grow anaerobically when exposed to light and aerobically under dark conditions at atmospheric levels of oxygen. R. ferrireducens is a nonphototrophic facultative anaerobe capable of reducing Fe(III) at temperatures as low as 4 °C. R. saidenbachensis grows strictly aerobic and has a very low rate of cell division. All Rhodoferax species possess ubiquinone and rhodoquinone derivatives with eight unit isoprenoid side chains. Dominant fatty acids in Rhodoferax cells are palmitoleic acid (16:1) and palmitic acid (16:0), as well as 3-OH octanoic acid (8:0). Major carotenoids found in the phototrophic species are spheroidene, OH-spheroidene, and spirilloxanthin.

== Genomes ==
As of 2014, three genomes have been sequenced from the genus Rhodoferax. Sequencing of the R. ferrireducens T118 genome was carried out by the Joint Genome Institute, and assembly was completed in 2005. The R. ferrireducens genome contains a 4.71 Mbp chromosome with 59.9% GC content and a 257-kbp plasmid with 54.4% GC content. It has 4,169 protein-coding genes, six rRNA genes, and 44 tRNA genes on the chromosome, as well as 75 pseudogenes. The plasmid contains 248 protein coding genes, one tRNA gene, and 2 pseudogenes. Examination of the R. ferrireducens genome indicates that though it cannot grow autotrophically, several genes associated with CO_{2} fixation are present. The genome contains the gene for the ribulose-1,5-bisphosphate carboxylase/oxygenase (rubisco) large subunit, while the small subunit is missing. Other Calvin-cycle enzymes are present, but the phosphoketolase and sedoheptulose-bisphosphatase genes are missing. The genome also contains several genes suggesting R. ferrireducens may have some ability to resist exposure to metalloids and heavy metals. These genes include a putative arsenite efflux pump and an arsenate reductase, as well as genes similar to those found in organisms capable of tolerating copper, chromium, cadmium, zinc, and cobalt. Despite its psychrotolerance, the genome appears to lack any known major cold-shock proteins.

Another sequenced genome in the genus Rhodoferax comes from R. antarcticus. This genome consists of a 3.8-Mbp chromosome with 59.1% GC content and a 198-kbp plasmid with 48.4% GC content. The chromosome contains 4,036 putative open reading frames (ORFs), and the plasmid contains 226 ORFs. Within the genome are 64 tRNA, and three rRNA genes. Analysis of the genome reveals the presence of two forms of rubisco. The presence of two forms may allow R. antarcticus to take advantage of changing CO_{2} concentrations.

The third Rhodoferax genome, Rhodoferax saidenbachensis, was sequenced by the Swedish Veterinary Institute SVA. The GC content of the 4.26 Mb genome is 60.9%. There are 3949 protein-coding genes, 46 tRNA, and six rRNA genes in the genome of the R. sidenbachensis type strain ED16 = DSM22694.

== Habitats ==
Rhodoferax species are frequently found in stagnant aquatic systems exposed to light. Isolates of R. fermentans used for the type description of the genus were first isolated from ditch water and activated sludge. Other environments from which this species has been isolated include pond water and sewage. In the case of R. antarcticus, strains were first isolated from microbial mats collected from saline ponds in Cape Royds, Ross Island, Antarctica. In contrast to other Rhodoferax species, where isolation sources were exposed to light, the isolation of the nonphototrophic R. ferrireducens was carried out using anaerobic subsurface aquifer sediments.

== Physiology and biochemistry ==
Growth of some Rhodoferax species can be supported by anoxygenic photoorganotrophy, anaerobic-dark fermentation, or aerobic respiration. The species R. fermentans and R. antarcticus are capable of phototrophic growth using carbon sources such as acetate, pyruvate, lactate, succinate, malate, fumarate, glucose, fructose, citrate, and aspartate. Growth via sugar fermentation can be carried out in the dark by R. fermentans, and is stimulated by the addition of bicarbonate. R. antarcticus has not yet demonstrated the ability to ferment under dark anaerobic conditions, but is capable of aerobic chemoorganotrophy. In contrast, R. ferrireducens is not capable of photoorganotrophy or fermentation, but is capable of anaerobic respiration (iron respiration) by reducing ferric iron (Fe^{3+}) to ferrous iron (Fe^{2+}), using organic electron donors (i.e. acetate, lactate, propionate, pyruvate, malate, succinate, and benzoate). Growth temperatures for Rhodoferax species range from 2 to 30 °C. R. fermentans is a mesophile, with an optimal growth temperature between 25 and 30 °C. The other three species, R. antarcticus, R. ferrireducens, and R. saidenbachensis, are psychrotolerant species with optimal growth temperatures above 15 °C, but capable of growth at temperatures near 0 °C.

== Biotechnology ==
Currently, research in the area of sustainable energy is investigating the application and design of microbial fuel cells (MFC) using R. ferrireducens. In an MFC, a bacterial suspension is provided a reduced compound, which the bacteria use as a source of electrons. The bacteria metabolize this compound and shuttle the released electrons through their respiratory networks and ultimately donate them to a synthetic electron acceptor, also known as an anode. When connected to a cathode, the bacterial metabolism of the reduced compound generates electricity and CO_{2}. The advantage of MFCs over conventional electricity generation is the direct conversion of chemical energy into electricity, improving energy conversion efficiency. A unique feature of using R. ferrireducens over other bacteria is that many other bacteria require the addition of a mediator to shuttle the electrons from the bacterial cells to the anode. For R. ferrireducens, through an unknown membrane protein, electrons are directly shuttled from the membrane to the anode.
