= Curvibacter =

Scientific classification
- Domain: Bacteria
- Kingdom: Pseudomonadati
- Phylum: Pseudomonadota
- Class: Betaproteobacteria
- Order: Burkholderiales
- Family: Comamonadaceae
- Genus: Curvibacter; Ding and Yokota 2004

Type species
- Curvibacter gracilis

Species
- C. delicatus C. fontanus C. gracilis C. lanceolatus

Genus of bacteria

Curvibacter is a genus of comamonad bacteria.
