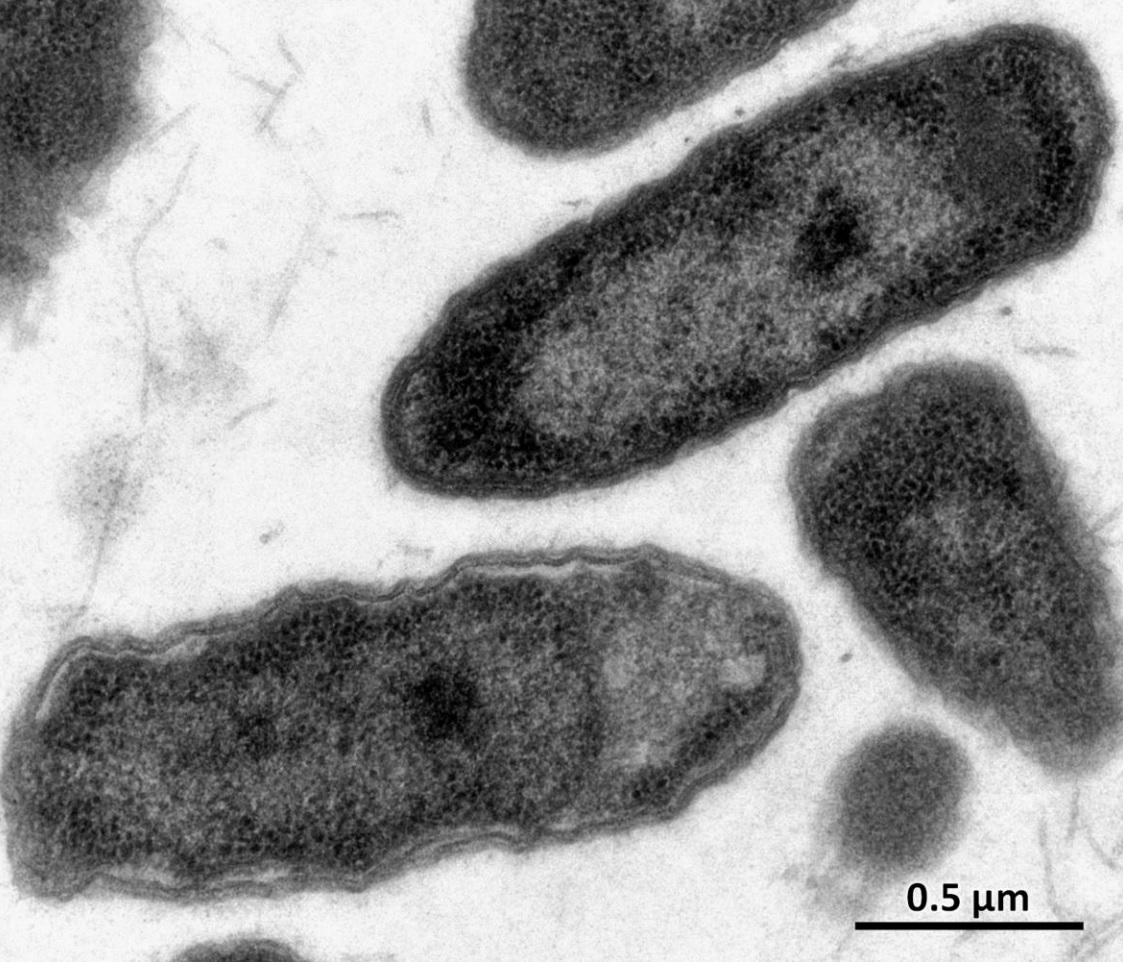
- Oryzisolibacter propanilivorax

Scientific classification
- Domain: Bacteria
- Kingdom: Pseudomonadati
- Phylum: Pseudomonadota
- Class: Betaproteobacteria
- Order: Burkholderiales
- Family: Comamonadaceae
- Genus: Oryzisolibacter; Vaz et al. 2017

Species
- O. propanilivorax

= Oryzisolibacter =

Genus of bacteria

Oryzisolibacter is a Gram-negative and motile genus of bacteria from the family of Comamonadaceae with one known species (Oryzisolibacter propanilivorax).
