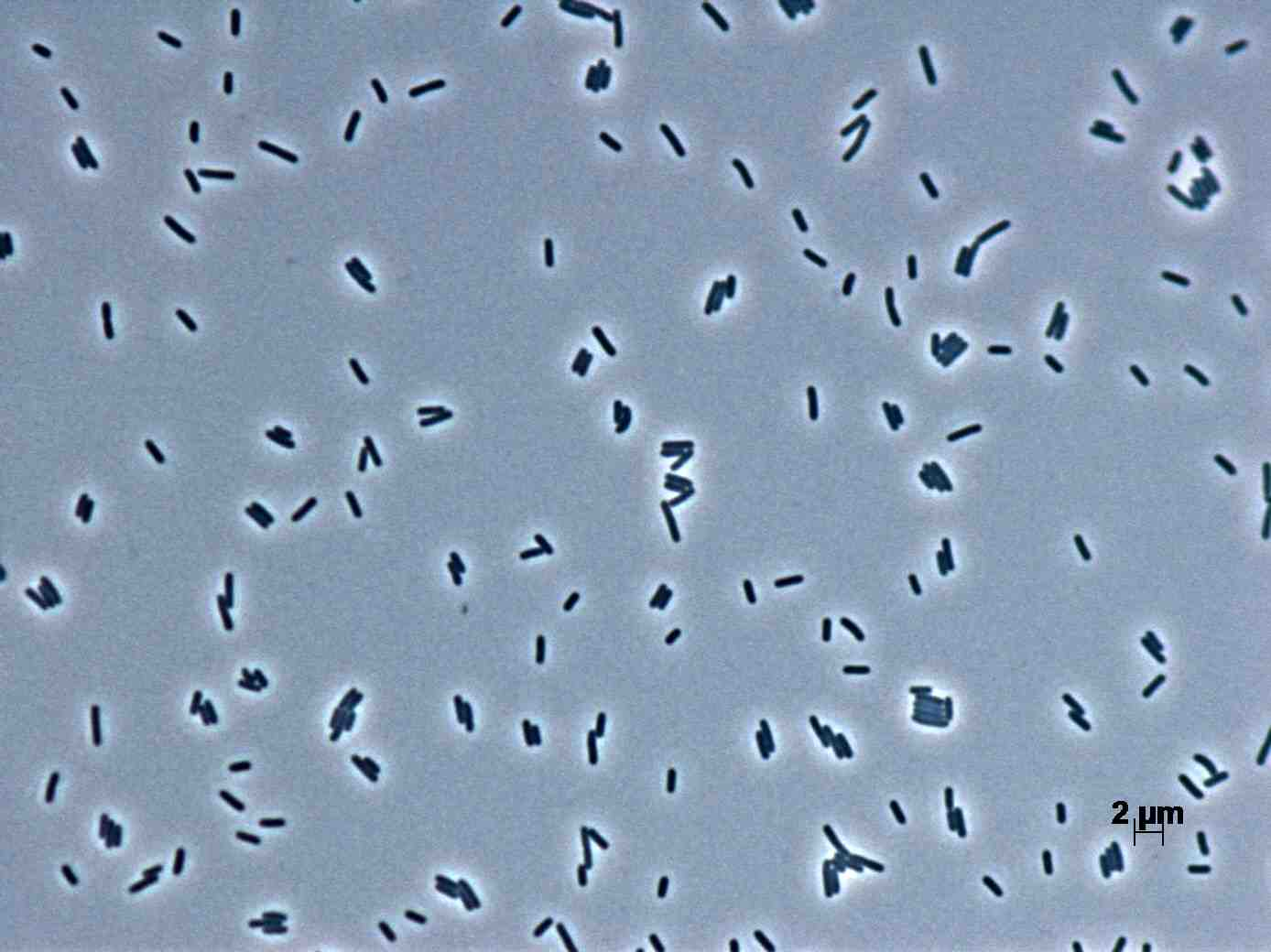
- Diaphorobacter nitroreducens

Scientific classification
- Domain: Bacteria
- Kingdom: Pseudomonadati
- Phylum: Pseudomonadota
- Class: Betaproteobacteria
- Order: Burkholderiales
- Family: Comamonadaceae
- Genus: Diaphorobacter; Khan and Hiraishi 2003

Species
- Diaphorobacter aerolatus Diaphorobacter nitroreducens Diaphorobacter oryzae Diaphorobacter polyhydroxybutyrativorans Diaphorobacter ruginosibacter

= Diaphorobacter =

Genus of bacteria

Diaphorobacter is a genus of bacteria from the family Comamonadaceae.
