= Caldimonas manganoxidans =

Scientific classification
- Domain: Bacteria
- Kingdom: Pseudomonadati
- Phylum: Pseudomonadota
- Class: Betaproteobacteria
- Order: Burkholderiales
- Family: Comamonadaceae
- Genus: Caldimonas
- Species: C. manganoxidans

Binomial name
- Caldimonas manganoxidans Takeda et al. 2002

Type strain
- ATCC BAA-369, CIP 107619, HS, IFO 16448, JCM 10698, NBRC 16448

Species of bacterium

Caldimonas manganoxidans is a Gram-negative, aerobic and thermophilic bacterium from the genus Caldimonas which has been isolated from a hot spring.
