= Hylemonella =

Scientific classification
- Domain: Bacteria
- Kingdom: Pseudomonadati
- Phylum: Pseudomonadota
- Class: Betaproteobacteria
- Order: Burkholderiales
- Family: Comamonadaceae
- Genus: Hylemonella; Spring et al. 2004

Species
- H. gracilis

Genus of bacteria

Hydrogenophaga is a genus of bacteria from the family of Comamonadaceae with one known species (Hylemonella gracilis). Hylemonella gracilis has been isolated from pondwater.
