= Roseateles terrae =

Scientific classification
- Domain: Bacteria
- Kingdom: Pseudomonadati
- Phylum: Pseudomonadota
- Class: Betaproteobacteria
- Order: Burkholderiales
- Family: Comamonadaceae
- Genus: Roseateles
- Species: R. terrae

Binomial name
- Roseateles terrae Gomila et al. 2008

Type strain
- CCUG 52222 (=CECT 7247)

Species of bacterium

Roseateles terrae is a Gram-negative, aerobic, oxidase- and catalase-positive bacterium with a single polar flagellum from the genus Roseateles, which was isolated from soil in Japan. Its cell length is 2 μm and width is 0.5 μm. It does not produce pigments.
