= Roseateles =

Scientific classification
- Domain: Bacteria
- Kingdom: Pseudomonadati
- Phylum: Pseudomonadota
- Class: Betaproteobacteria
- Order: Burkholderiales
- Family: Comamonadaceae
- Genus: Roseateles; Suyama et al. 1999

Type species
- Roseateles depolymerans

Species
- Roseateles aquatilis Roseateles depolymerans Roseateles terrae

Genus of bacteria

Roseateles is a genus of bacteria from the family Comamonadaceae.
