= Ottowia =

Scientific classification
- Domain: Bacteria
- Kingdom: Pseudomonadati
- Phylum: Pseudomonadota
- Class: Betaproteobacteria
- Order: Burkholderiales
- Family: Comamonadaceae
- Genus: Ottowia; Spring et al. 2004

Species
- O. beijingensis O. flava O. oryzae O. shaoguanensis O. pentelensis O. thiooxydans

Genus of bacteria

Ottowia is a genus of bacteria from the family of Comamonadaceae.
