= Caldimonas =

Scientific classification
- Domain: Bacteria
- Kingdom: Pseudomonadati
- Phylum: Pseudomonadota
- Class: Betaproteobacteria
- Order: Burkholderiales
- Family: Comamonadaceae
- Genus: Caldimonas; Takeda et al. 2002

Type species
- Caldimonas manganoxidans

Species
- C. manganoxidans C. hydrothermale C. taiwanensis

Genus of bacteria

Caldimonas is a genus of bacteria from the family of Comamonadaceae.
