= Acidovorax delafieldii =

Scientific classification
- Domain: Bacteria
- Kingdom: Pseudomonadati
- Phylum: Pseudomonadota
- Class: Betaproteobacteria
- Order: Burkholderiales
- Family: Comamonadaceae
- Genus: Acidovorax
- Species: A. delafieldii

Binomial name
- Acidovorax delafieldii (Davis 1970) Willems et al. 1990

Species of bacterium

Acidovorax delafieldii is a Gram-negative soil bacterium. It belongs to Comamonadaceae.
