= Tepidimonas =

Scientific classification
- Domain: Bacteria
- Kingdom: Pseudomonadati
- Phylum: Pseudomonadota
- Class: Betaproteobacteria
- Order: Burkholderiales
- Family: Comamonadaceae
- Genus: Tepidimonas; Moreira et al. 2000

Type species
- Tepidimonas ignava Moreira et al. 2000

Species
- Tepidimonas aquatica Tepidimonas fonticaldi Tepidimonas ignava Tepidimonas taiwanensis Tepidimonas thermarum

Genus of bacteria

Tepidimonas is a genus of Gram-negative, strictly aerobic, oxidase- and catalase-positive, rod-shaped, slightly thermophilic bacteria from the family Comamonadaceae.
