= Extensimonas =

Scientific classification
- Domain: Bacteria
- Kingdom: Pseudomonadati
- Phylum: Pseudomonadota
- Class: Betaproteobacteria
- Order: Burkholderiales
- Family: Comamonadaceae
- Genus: Extensimonas; Zhang et al. 2013

Type species
- Extensimonas vulgaris

Species
- E. vulgaris

Genus of bacteria

Extensimonas is a Gram-negative, neutrophilic and non-spore-forming genus of bacteria from the family of Comamonadaceae with one known species (Extensimonas vulgaris). Extensimonas vulgaris has been isolated from industrial wastewater from Xiaoshan in China.
