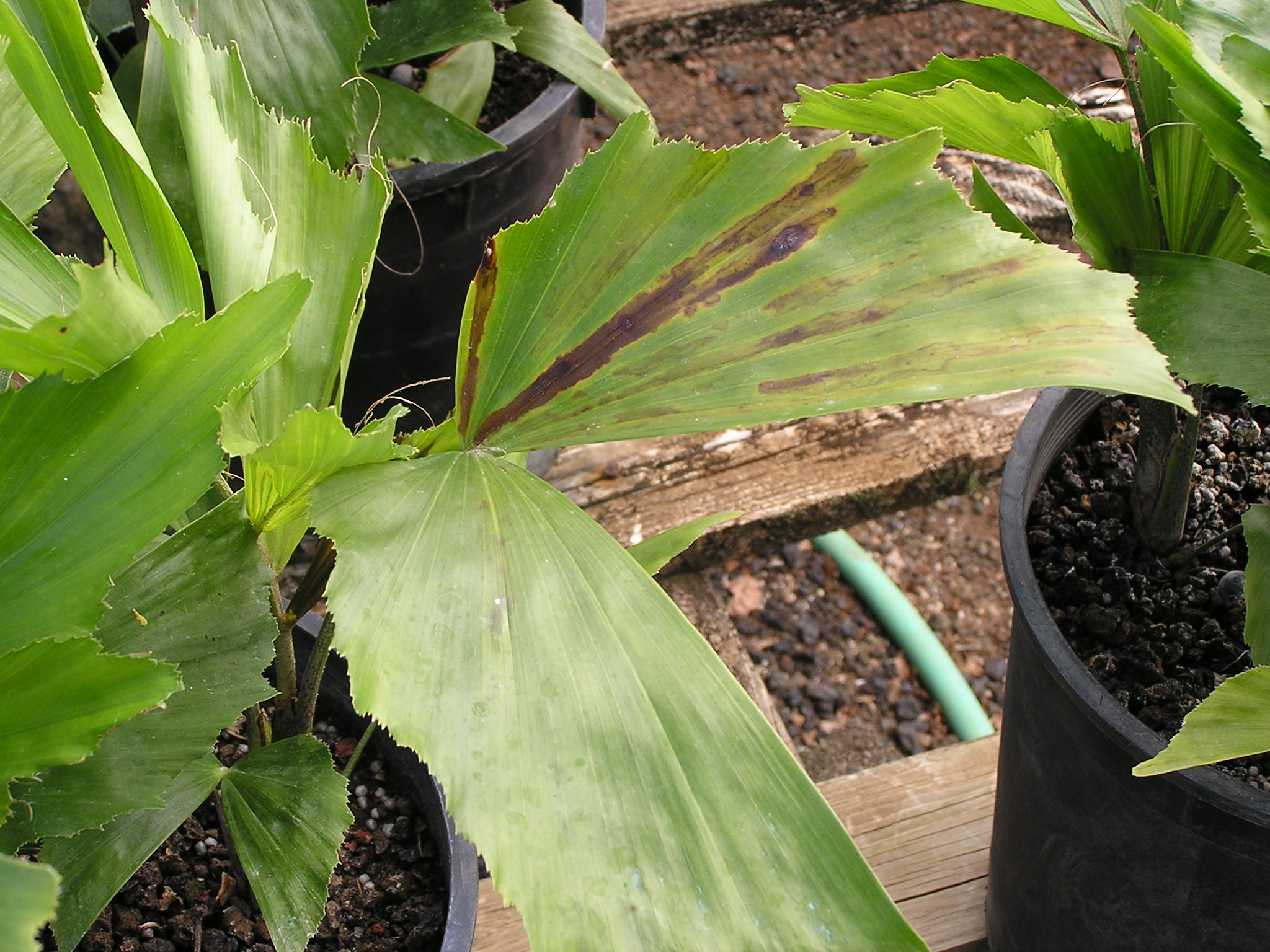
- Bacterial leaf blight of fishtail palm caused by Acidovorax avenae subsp. avenae

Scientific classification
- Domain: Bacteria
- Kingdom: Pseudomonadati
- Phylum: Pseudomonadota
- Class: Betaproteobacteria
- Order: Burkholderiales
- Family: Comamonadaceae
- Genus: Acidovorax

Type species
- Acidovorax facilis

Species
- Acidovorax aerodenitrificans; Acidovorax anthurii; Acidovorax caeni; Acidovorax cattleyae; Acidovorax citrulli; Acidovorax defluvii; Acidovorax delafieldii; Acidovorax facilis; Acidovorax konjaci; Acidovorax oryzae; Acidovorax radicis; Acidovorax soli; Acidovorax temperans; Acidovorax valerianellae; Acidovorax wohlfahrtii

= Acidovorax =

Genus of bacteria

Acidovorax is a genus in the family Comamonadaceae. The genus contains some plant pathogens, such as Acidovorax avenae, which causes bacterial fruit blotch on cucurbit crops. Other Acidovorax sp. perform Fe(II) oxidation in anaerobic environments, forming iron minerals in the soil.
