= Albidiferax =

Scientific classification
- Domain: Bacteria
- Kingdom: Pseudomonadati
- Phylum: Pseudomonadota
- Class: Betaproteobacteria
- Order: Burkholderiales
- Family: Comamonadaceae
- Genus: Albidiferax
- Species: A. ferrireducens

Binomial name
- Albidiferax ferrireducens corrig. Ramana and Sasikala 2009s

Genus of bacteria

Albidiferax is a genus in the phylum Pseudomonadota (Bacteria).

== Etymology ==
The name Albidiferax derives from:
Latin adjective albidus, whitish, white; Latin adjective ferax, fertile; Neo-Latin masculine gender noun Albidiferax, whitish and fertile.

== Species ==
The genus contains a single species, namely Albidiferax ferrireducens ( corrig. (Finneran et al. 2003) Ramana and Sasikala 2009, (Type species of the genus).; Latin noun ferrum, iron; Latin participle adjective reducens (from Latin v. reducere), leading back, bringing back and in chemistry converting to a different oxidation state; Neo-Latin participle adjective ferrireducens, iron-reducing (converting iron to a reduced oxidation state).)

== See also ==
- Bacterial taxonomy
- Microbiology
