= Caenimonas =

Scientific classification
- Domain: Bacteria
- Kingdom: Pseudomonadati
- Phylum: Pseudomonadota
- Class: Betaproteobacteria
- Order: Burkholderiales
- Family: Comamonadaceae
- Genus: Caenimonas; Ryu et al. 2008

Type species
- Caenimonas koreensis

Species
- C. koreensis C. terrae

Genus of bacteria

Caenimonas is a genus from the family of Comamonadaceae.
