= Giesbergeria =

Scientific classification
- Domain: Bacteria
- Kingdom: Pseudomonadati
- Phylum: Pseudomonadota
- Class: Betaproteobacteria
- Order: Burkholderiales
- Family: Comamonadaceae
- Genus: Giesbergeria; Grabovich et al. 2006

Type species
- Giesbergeria voronezhensis

Species
- G. anulus G. giesbergeri G. kuznetsovii G. sinuosa G. voronezhensis

Genus of bacteria

Giesbergeria is a genus of bacteria from the family of Comamonadaceae. Giesbergeria is named after the Dutch microbiologist G. Giesberger.
