= Polaromonas cryoconiti =

Scientific classification
- Domain: Bacteria
- Kingdom: Pseudomonadati
- Phylum: Pseudomonadota
- Class: Betaproteobacteria
- Order: Burkholderiales
- Family: Comamonadaceae
- Genus: Polaromonas
- Species: P. cryoconiti

Binomial name
- Polaromonas cryoconiti Margesin et al. 2012

Type strain
- Cr4-35, DSM 24248, DSM 24278, KACC 15090, LMG 26050

Species of bacterium

Polaromonas cryoconiti is a Gram-negative, psychrophilic bacterium from the genus Polaromonas, which was isolated from an alpine glacier.
