= Alicycliphilus =

Scientific classification
- Domain: Bacteria
- Kingdom: Pseudomonadati
- Phylum: Pseudomonadota
- Class: Betaproteobacteria
- Order: Burkholderiales
- Family: Comamonadaceae
- Genus: Alicycliphilus; Mechichi et al. 2003

Type species
- A. denitrificans

Genus of bacteria

Alicycliphilus is a genus in the phylum Pseudomonadota (Bacteria).

== Etymology ==
The name Alicycliphilus derives from:
Greek adjective aliphos, fat; Latin noun cyclus, circle or ring; Neo-Latin pref. alicycli-, referring to circular fat-like organic compounds; Neo-Latin adjective philus from Greek adjective philos (φίλος) meaning friend, loving; Neo-Latin masculine gender adjective Alicycliphilus, alicyclic compound-liking, referring to the substrates used for the isolation of this organism.

== Species ==
The genus contains a single species, namely A. denitrificans. The specific epithet denitrificans is a Neo-Latin participle adjective meaning denitrifying.

== See also ==
- Bacterial taxonomy
- Microbiology
