= Poly(hexamethylene carbonate) =

Identifiers
CAS Number	61630-98-6
ChemSpider	none

Properties
Chemical formula	(C_{7}H_{12}O_{3})_{n}
Molar mass	Variable
- Except where otherwise noted, data are given for materials in their standard state (at 25 °C [77 °F], 100 kPa). Infobox references

Poly(hexamethylene carbonate) (PHC) is an organic polymer. It can be biodegredated to form adipic acid and di(6-hydroxyhexyl) carbonate by Roseateles depolymerans 61A. PHC can be synthesized to terminate in primarily hydroxyl groups or methyl carbonate groups depending on the concentrations of monomers during synthesis. PHC with the hydroxyl end groups has less thermal stability than PHC with methyl carbonate end groups. The hydroxyl group allow for an unzipping reaction to take place in which the polymer chain bends back on itself and the hydroxyl group reacts with an acetyl mid chain, resulting in a shorter chain and a looped molecule. This type of degradation quickly shorten the length of the PHC.
