= Pacificitalea =

Scientific classification
- Domain: Bacteria
- Kingdom: Pseudomonadati
- Phylum: Pseudomonadota
- Class: Alphaproteobacteria
- Order: Rhodobacterales
- Family: Roseobacteraceae
- Genus: Pacificitalea; Hördt et al. 2020
- Species: P. manganoxidans

Binomial name
- Pacificitalea manganoxidans (Wang et al. 2015) Hördt et al. 2020

Type strain
- JCM 19384, KCTC 32473, strain DY2-5

Synonyms
- Celeribacter manganoxidans Wang et al. 2015

Genus of bacteria

Pacificitalea manganoxidans is a Gram-negative, strictly aerobic, manganese-oxidizing and non-motile bacterium which has been isolated from sediments of the Pacific Clarion-Clipperton fracture zone in China. It is the only species in the genus Pacificitalea.
