= Hydrogenophaga =

Scientific classification
- Domain: Bacteria
- Kingdom: Pseudomonadati
- Phylum: Pseudomonadota
- Class: Betaproteobacteria
- Order: Burkholderiales
- Family: Comamonadaceae
- Genus: Hydrogenophaga; Willems et al. 1989

Species
- H. aquatica H. atypica H. bisanensis H. caeni H. crassostreae H. defluvii H. flava H. laconesensis H. luteola H. intermedia H. palleronii H. pseudoflava H. soli H. taeniospiralis

Genus of bacteria

Hydrogenophaga is a genus of comamonad bacteria, several of which were formerly classified in the genus Pseudomonas.
