= Hydrogenophaga intermedia =

Scientific classification
- Domain: Bacteria
- Kingdom: Pseudomonadati
- Phylum: Pseudomonadota
- Class: Betaproteobacteria
- Order: Burkholderiales
- Family: Comamonadaceae
- Genus: Hydrogenophaga
- Species: H. intermedia

Binomial name
- Hydrogenophaga intermedia Contzen et al. 2001, sp. nov.

Type strain
- CIP 107269, DSM 5680, IAM 14919, JCM 21401, KCTC 12151, NBRC 102510

Species of bacterium

Hydrogenophaga intermedia is a Gram-negative, oxidase-positive bacterium from the Comamonadaceae family. It has the ability to degrade 4-aminobenzenesulfonate.
