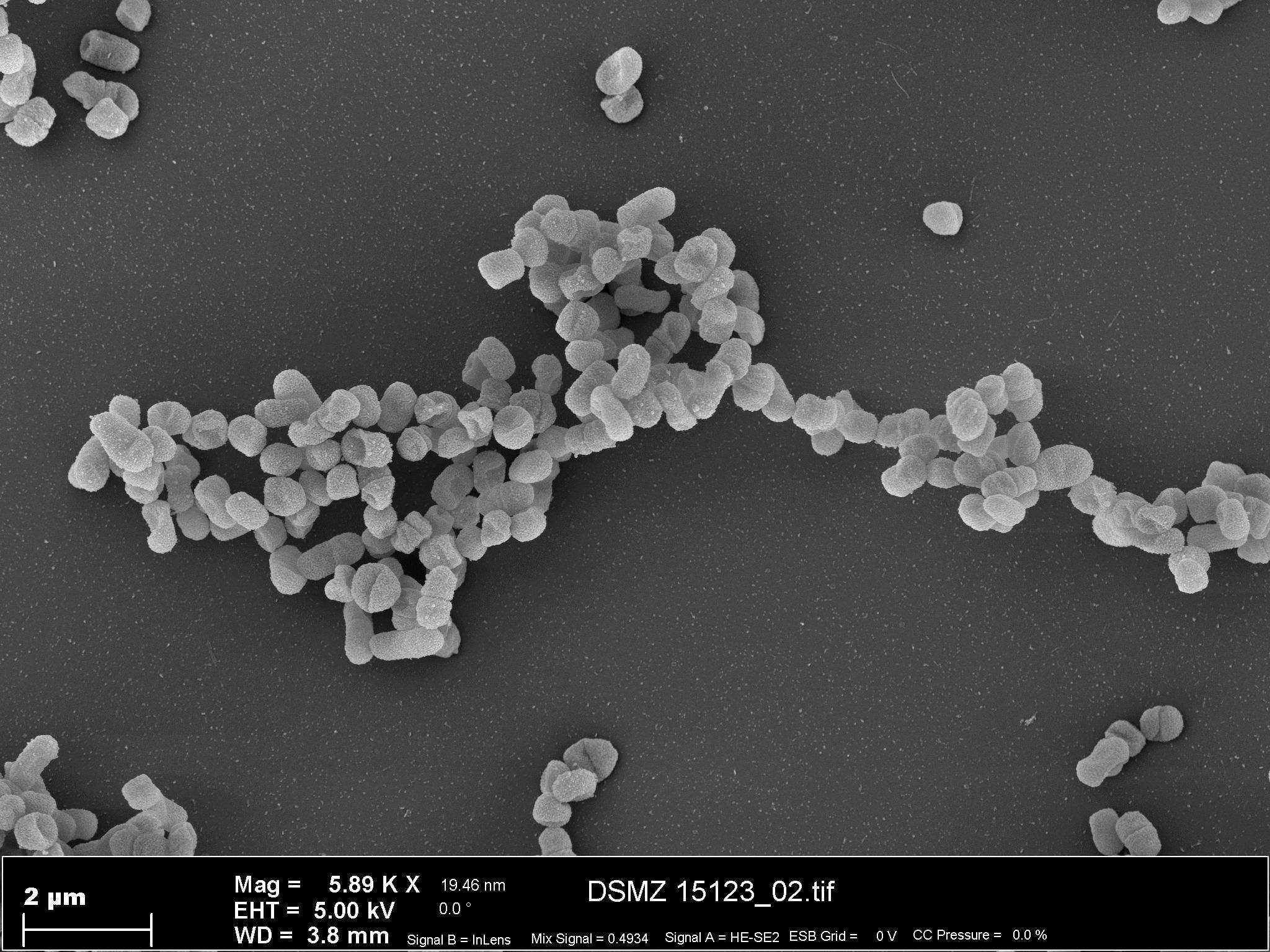
- Brachymonas denitrificans

Scientific classification
- Domain: Bacteria
- Kingdom: Pseudomonadati
- Phylum: Pseudomonadota
- Class: Betaproteobacteria
- Order: Burkholderiales
- Family: Comamonadaceae
- Genus: Brachymonas; Hiraishi et al., 1995, gen. nov.

Type species
- Brachymonas denitrificans

Species
- Brachymonas chironomi Brachymonas denitrificans Brachymonas petroleovorans

= Brachymonas (bacterium) =

Genus of bacteria

Brachymonas is a genus of gram-negative, aerobic bacteria.
