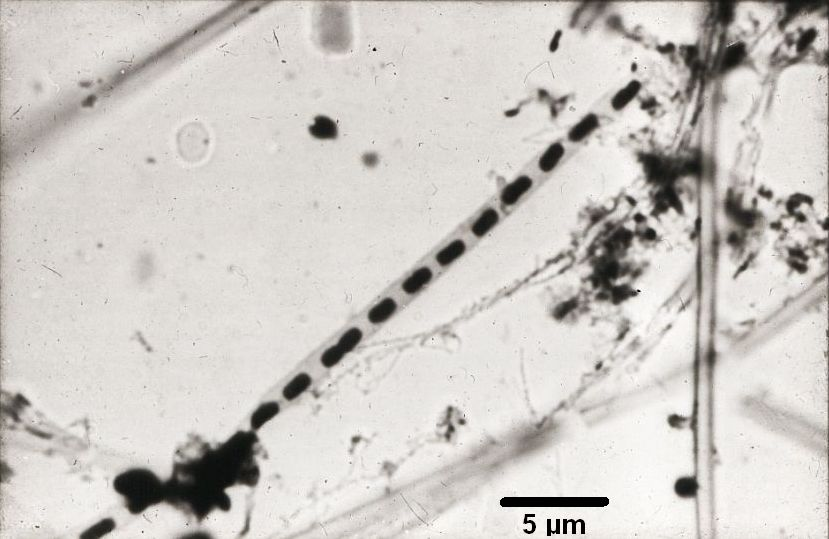
- Leptothrix sp. under a light microscope

Scientific classification
- Domain: Bacteria
- Kingdom: Pseudomonadati
- Phylum: Pseudomonadota
- Class: Betaproteobacteria
- Order: Burkholderiales
- Family: Comamonadaceae; Willems et al. 1991

Genera
- Acidovorax; Albidiferax; Alicycliphilus; Brachymonas; Caenibacterium; Caenimonas; Caldimonas; Comamonas; Curvibacter; Delftia; Diaphorobacter; Extensimonas; Giesbergeria; Hydrogenophaga; Hylemonella; Ideonella; Kinneretia; Lampropedia; Limnohabitans; Macromonas; Malikia; Oryzisolibacter; Ottowia; Pelomonas; Polaromonas; Pseudoacidovorax; Pseudorhodoferax; Ramlibacter; Rhodoferax; Roseateles; Schlegelella; Simplicispira; Sphaerotilus; Tepidicella; Tepidimonas; Thiomonas; Variovorax; Verminephrobacter; Xenophilus

= Comamonadaceae =

Family of bacteria

The Comamonadaceae are a family of the Betaproteobacteria. Like all Pseudomonadota, they are Gram-negative. They are aerobic and most of the species are motile via flagella. The cells are curved rod-shaped.
