= Xenophilus azovorans =

Scientific classification
- Domain: Bacteria
- Kingdom: Pseudomonadati
- Phylum: Pseudomonadota
- Class: Betaproteobacteria
- Order: Burkholderiales
- Family: Comamonadaceae
- Genus: Xenophilus
- Species: X. azovorans

Binomial name
- Xenophilus azovorans Blümel et al. 2001

Type strain
- ATCC BAA-794, ATCCBAA-794, CCUG 47268, DSM 13620, KF46F, NCIMB 13707

Species of bacterium

Xenophilus azovorans is a bacterium from the genus Xenophilus which has been isolated from soil in Switzerland.

== Overview ==
Xenophilus azovorans is a motile, Gram-negative, non-spore forming rod-shaped bacterium. Rods are straight or sometimes slightly curved and were measured to be 0.5-1 μm by 1-3 μm under a light microscope. They exist singly or in pairs. Grown at 30 degrees Celsius on nutrient agar, it gives rise to opaque, yellow-colored colonies. These colonies can sometimes be difficult to detect as singular to due slimy extracellular secretions. X. azovorans has a high GC content of 69.73 percent, which is characteristic of its genus. Its most notable characteristic is its ability to degrade Orange II azo dyes. Synthetic azo dyes are necessary for the construction of cosmetics, leather goods, textiles, and paper products. However, they are not usually degraded in typical waste-treatment systems and are of significant concern to environmentalists.

== Nomenclature ==
The genus Xenophilus comes from the Greek words "xeno" meaning foreign or strange and "philia" which translates to friendship or fondness. The species name azovorans comes from its ability to degrade azo dyes and the Latin "vorare," meaning devour.

== Discovery and isolation ==
Previously known as Pseudomonas sp. strain KF46F, Xenophilus azovorans was first isolated by Kulla et al. in 1984 from a soil inoculate that had been enriched with carboxy-orange II (1-(4'-carboxyphenylazo)-2-naphthol) as a sole carbon source. Then, in an attempt to clarify taxonomy of bacterial strains capable of degrading azo compounds, scientists characterized X. azovorans strain KF46F^{T} from this original culture. This strain is a non-mucoid version of KF46F which has been preserved for over 25 years by freezing. In the lab, the strain was able to grow on nutrient-rich media, but failed to completely degrade Orange II under such conditions. Fatty acid extraction was analyzed by a Hewlett Packard model gas chromatograph and prepared by the Microbial Identification System protocol. Isolation of genomic DNA was performed by Ausubel et al. in 1996. Amplification of the 16S ribosomal RNA and subsequent phylogenetic analysis was performed using the ARB software package. ARB software is a graphic package that contains tools needed for the handling of sequence database and data analysis and has led to the establishment of an interdisciplinary bioinformatics group. Extrachromosomal DNA in the form of two large plasmids was detected by pulsed-field gel electrophoresis.

== Neighboring strains ==
Sequencing of the 16S ribosomal RNA gene revealed phylogenetic relatives within 95.0 to 96.1 percent similarity. Those relatives are as follows: Hydrogena, Acidovorax, Comamonas, and Xylophilus. Xenophilus azovorans can be set apart from these other genera based on its unique fatty acid composition. A phylogenetic tree was built using the maximum-parsimony method, and close branches are listed below.

=== Acidovorax anthurii ===
Acidovorax anthurii, also a member of Family Comamonadacea, causes bacterial leaf-spot on the plant anthurium.

=== Comamonas testosteroni ===
Comamonas testosteroni is a rare human pathogen associated with acute appendicitis. It is known to have extremely low virulence and very rarely cause disease. Similar to X. azovorans, it was previously classified within the Pseudomonas group.

=== Hydrogenophaga flava ===
Isolated from mud and soil in the USSR, Hydrogenophaga flava is a Gram-negative facultatively autotrophic hydrogen bacteria.

=== Xenophilus aerolatus ===
Xenophilus aerolatus, strain designation 5516S-2T is a Gram-negative, motile, bacillus aerobe. Its colonies are circular and yellow in pigment, with entire (smooth) margins. It was as first isolated on May 16, 2005, from air in an outdoor region of downtown Suwon, Korea by Soo-Jin Kim. Optimum growth conditions happen at 25 to 35 degrees Celsius, a NaCl concentration of 0-2 percent, and at pH 5.0 to 9.0. It is oxidase and catalase positive. X. aerolatus has a GC content of 69 percent, which is normal for its genus. As its name suggests, X. aerolatus was first isolated from the air of Suwon, Korea. Although not known to be pathogenic, Xenophilus aerolatus has been recorded as a complication of peritoneal dialysis.

== Physiology ==
X. azovorans are Gram-negative bacteria with cells 0. 5 to 1 μm in width and 1 to 3 μm in length. The organism is known as strain KF46F^{T} and was grown on nutrient agar for three days at 30 degrees Celsius. The carbon and energy source used for cultivation was carboxy-Orange II. Under the direction of a light microscope, the organism was found to give rise to circular, yellow-pigmented colonies. After cultivation, X. azovorans were determined to be aerobic, motile, and non-spore forming. X. azovorans grows at an optimal temperature of 30 degrees Celsius. It is also important to note that strain KF46F^{T} is able to grow on various media like nutrient broth (30 degrees Celsius) and Luria-Burtani, but is usually not able to degrade carboxy-Orange II when grown on these media. Strain KF46F^{T} consists of predominant polar lipids such as phosphatidylethanolamine, diphosphatidylglycerol, phosphatidylglycerol, and has an unknown aminophospholipid.

== Genomics ==
The complete genome of X. azovorans DSM 13620^{T} has been sequenced by the DOE Joint Genome Institute (JGI) with the principal investigator being Nikos Kyrpides. The genome was sequenced using Whole Genome Sequencing. Specifically, the methods include Ilumina, Illumina HiSeq 2000, and Illumina HiSeq 2500 sequencing. The bacteria has 6349 genes and 6280 protein coding genes. It also has 69 RNA genes in its genome.

The 16s ribosomal RNA gene of X. azovorans KF46F^{T} has been amplified using the polymerase chain reaction (PCR) and has been sequenced. The gene has a sequence length of 1484 base pairs. Researchers performed pulse field gel electrophoresis, a similar method described by Barton et al., and determined that the strain contains two plasmids of sizes 100 and 350 kb. Per high performance liquid chromatography (HPLC) methods described by Mesbah and Whitman, GC content of X. azovorans KF46F^{T} was determined to be approximately 70 percent.

== Metabolism ==
X. azovorans is a chemoorganoheterotroph that carries out oxidative phosphorylation and uses oxygen as a terminal electron acceptor. The organism also has a gene predicted for nitrate reduction. The major quinone isolated was ubiquinone Q-8. This isolation was performed by HPLC methods as described by B.J. Tindall.

Based on research performed by Blumel et al., the organism was characterized by growth on different carbon sources and sugar fermentation. The characterization methods were taken from Kampfer et al. The organism is able to use a number of amino acids, sugars, and carboxylic acids as a carbon and energy source. A few examples include utilization of D-Fructose and D-Mannitol. Based on pathways shown on KEGG, 10.51 percent of X.azovoran's genome is genes that contribute to amino acid metabolism. As far as carbohydrate metabolism is understood, the organism also has a complete TCA cycle and glycolysis pathway on KEGG. Approximately 6.79 percent of the organism's genes contribute to Xenobiotic biodegradation and metabolism. Specifically, the organism has genes predicted for aminobenzoate and benzoate degradation.

The organism tests positive for oxidase and catalase, but cannot produce urease, unlike its closely related neighbor Xenophilus aerolatus.

== Ecology ==
X. azovorans was cultivated from the oral microbiota of domestic dogs. Researchers identified the bacterium by using comparative 16s rRNA sequencing. Specifically, a small percentage of cultivable X. azovorans was found in the dental plaque of the dogs.

X. azovorans has also been found in a compost-packed biofilter. The biofilter was treated with benzene-contaminated air. The bacterium was identified by using microbial population fingerprinting methods and the subsequent sequencing of fragments in the population by PCR. As the amount of benzene on the filter increased, the amount of cultivable bacteria increased as well. This was determined by cell plate counting and ribosomal intergenic spacer analysis (RISA).

== Applications ==
Aerobic azoreductases make a significant contribution to the aerobic treatment of wastewaters which are colored by azo dyes. Azo dyes have been determined to be xenobiotic compounds that have characteristics that defer biodegradation. Due to this significant use, the azoreductase gene from X. azovorans strain KF46F^{T} was purified using affinity chromatography methods and cloned using PCR. Specifically, the gene has been determined to have high activity with the following azo dyes: Acid Orange 7, 1-(2-Pyridylazo)-2-naphthol, Solvent Orange 7, and Acid Red 88. Untreated wastewater can be harmful to human populations due to the role they play in mutagenic activity. Research was performed at an azo dye processing plant which is near a large river and a drinking-water treatment plant. It was found that 3 percent of waste from the azo dye processing plant ended up in the river that provides water to thousands of people. This is a very dangerous situation because it has been suggested that CYP450 enzymes in the human intestine activate azo dyes. Nevertheless, it has been determined that the intestine would suffer greatly as well as damage to DNA in colon cells. Other studies, such as the one performed by Myslak et al., determined that painters exposed to azo dyes for a long period of time developed bladder cancer. All in all, it is important that more research be done on the X. azovorans azoreductase gene due to its ability to break down chemicals in wastewater and to potentially prevent many humans from developing intestinal diseases.
