= Ardra =

Ardra may refer to:

- Kingdom of Ardra, a former West African kingdom
- Amplified Ribosomal DNA Restriction Analysis, a molecular biology technique
- Ardra, a continent in the video game War of the Visions: Final Fantasy Brave Exvius
- Ardra Nakshatra, a lunar mansion in Hindu astrology
- Ardra, the villain in the Star Trek: The Next Generation episode "Devil's Due"

== See also ==
- Ardara (disambiguation)
