= George Herbert Weiss =

American mathematician (1930–2017)

- Born: February 19, 1930
- Died: February 14, 2017 (aged 86); Silver Spring, Maryland
- Known for: Continuous-time random walk
- Spouse: Delia Weiss
- Children: 3
- Scientific career
- Fields: Mathematician
- Institutions: National Institutes of Health
- Website: mscl.cit.nih.gov/homepages/ghw/

George H. Weiss (February 19, 1930 – February 14, 2017) was an American applied mathematician and physicist at the National Institutes of Health, known for his work on random walks. He did his undergraduate studies at the City College of New York and Columbia University, graduating in 1951, and earned a Ph.D. from the University of Maryland in 1958.

== Awards ==
In 1967, Weiss and Marvin Zelen shared the Washington Academy of Sciences award for their contributions in Mathematics. Established in 1939, this award recognizes noteworthy accomplishments by young scientists (40 years of age and under). In May 2010, the NIH held a symposium entitled "Random Walks in Biology and Beyond", in honor of Weiss's 80th birthday and recent retirement. In July 2010, at the Mexican Meeting on Mathematical and Experimental Physics, Weiss was awarded the Leopoldo García-Colín-Scherer Medal. This medal has been established in 2001 and awarded every three years to recognize outstanding international scientists for their contributions to the development of science.

== Research ==
Main contributions of Weiss are in the theory of random walks, in particular, the development of the Continuous Time Random Walk (CTRW). The original article that introduced CTRW has been cited more than 2000 times, and this work found applications in many different fields. In the summer of 2017, the European Physical Journal B (Condensed Matter and Complex Systems) is planning to publish a Special Issue: "Continuous Time Random Walk: fifty years on", which celebrates 50 years since the appearance of this seminal paper. The submissions to this issue are accepted until 31 May 2017 (EPJB). Weiss himself has made many significant contributions in applying the CTRW framework in the areas of optical imaging, financial market theory, and other fields. In recent years, his research in optical imaging was focusing on the application of CTRW in the case of the spatially anisotropic optical properties.

Weiss also used the renewal theory techniques to analyze the traffic flow, aiming to understand the problems of traffic delay and congestion. Besides his contributions in applications of CTRW to optical imaging, made also significant contributions in general medical research, and has worked extensively on crystalline lattices and their properties.

== Family ==
George H. Weiss was married to Delia Weiss (née Orgel; a sister of chemist Leslie Orgel). They have three children and nine grandchildren. He lived in Silver Spring, Maryland until his death.

== Selected publications ==
Books

- Maradudin, A. A.; Montroll, E. W.; Weiss, G. H. (1963), Theory of Lattice Dynamics in the Harmonic Approximation, Solid State Physics, Academic Press, MR 0154684.
- Weiss, George H. (1994), Aspects and Applications of the Random Walk, Random Materials and Processes, North-Holland Publishing Co., Amsterdam, ISBN 0-444-81606-2, MR 1280031.
- Shmueli, Uri; Weiss, George H. (1995), Introduction to Crystallographic Statistics, International Union of Crystallography Book Series, vol. 6, Oxford University Press, ISBN 978-0198559269.

Research articles

- Kimura, Motoo; Weiss, George H. (1964), "The stepping stone model of population structure and the decrease of genetic correlation with distance", Genetics, 49 (4): 561–576, doi:10.1093/genetics/49.4.561, PMC 1210594, PMID 17248204.
- Montroll, Elliott W.; Weiss, George H. (1965), "Random walks on lattices. II", Journal of Mathematical Physics, 6 (2): 167–181, Bibcode:1965JMP.....6..167M, doi:10.1063/1.1704269, MR 0172344.
