= Sarah Morris =

English painter

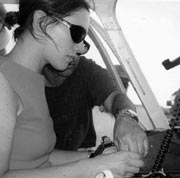
- Born: 20 June 1967 (age 59); Sevenoaks, Kent, England
- Education: Brown University; Cambridge University
- Known for: painting, film
- Awards: Berlin Prize Fellow (1999–2000); Joan Mitchell Foundation Award (2001) Omaggio in Histoire(s) du cinéma at the Locarno Film Festival (2012) Artist in Focus at the Rotterdam International Film Festival

Sarah Morris (born 20 June 1967 in Sevenoaks, Kent, England) is an American and British artist. (Note: Sources are mixed in reporting her nationality; Grove Art says that she is "American ... of English birth".) She lives in New York City in the United States.

== Personal life and education ==
Morris was born in Sevenoaks, Kent, in south-east England, on 20 June 1967. She attended Brown University from 1985 to 1989, Cambridge University, and the Independent Study Program of the Whitney Museum of American Art in 1989–90. She was a Berlin Prize fellow at the American Academy in Berlin in 1999–2000; in 2001 she received a Joan Mitchell Foundation painting award. She was married to Liam Gillick.

== Work ==
Morris works in both painting and film, and considers the two to be interconnected.

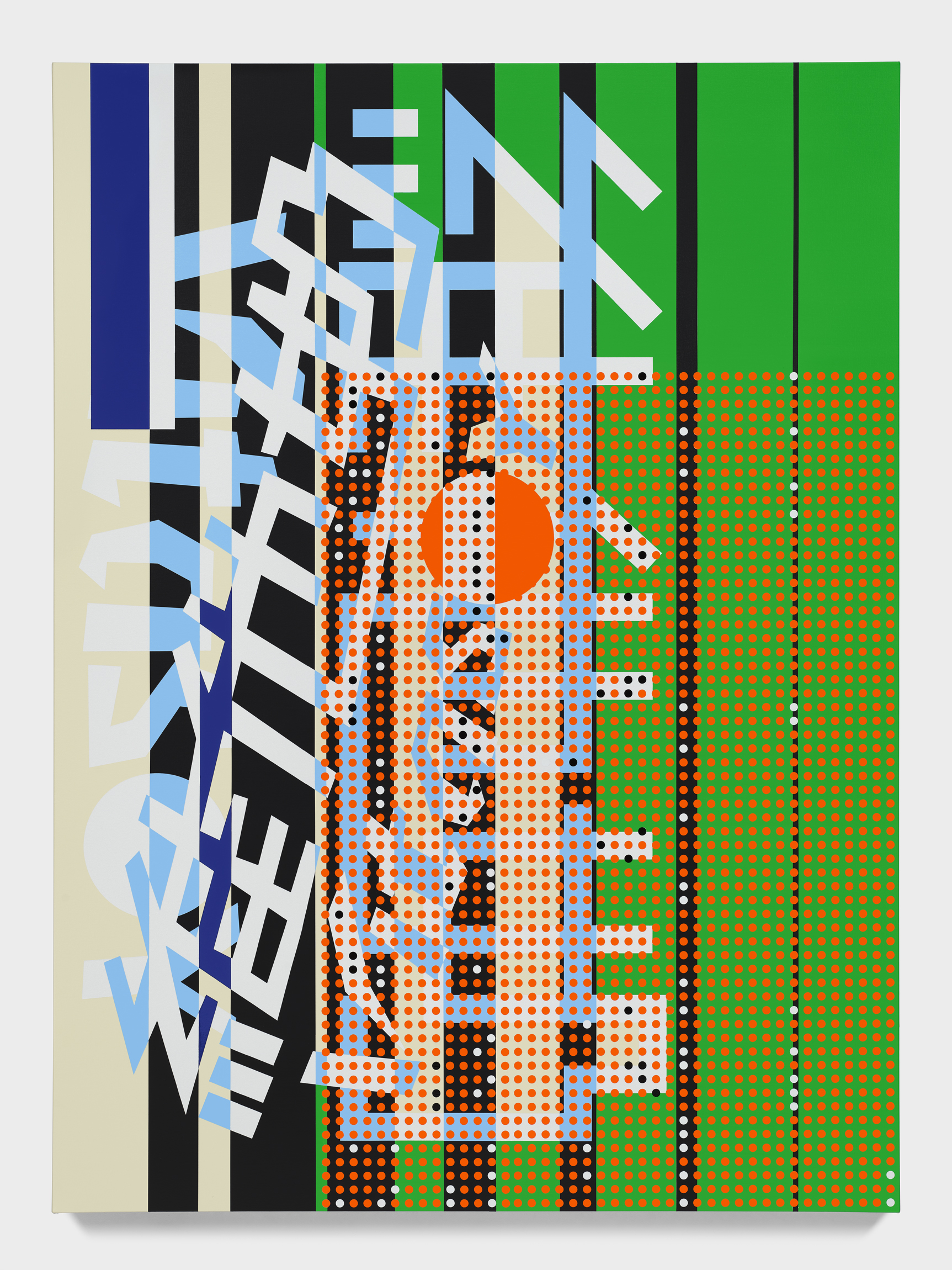
Vitasoy (Hong Kong) 207x152 cm

From about 1997 her paintings were geometric Modernist grid designs with flat planes of colour; a related series was of glass-faced skyscrapers with geometric landscape designs reflected in their façades. Among her earlier painting styles were screen-prints reminiscent of Andy Warhol, word-paintings, and paintings of shoes.

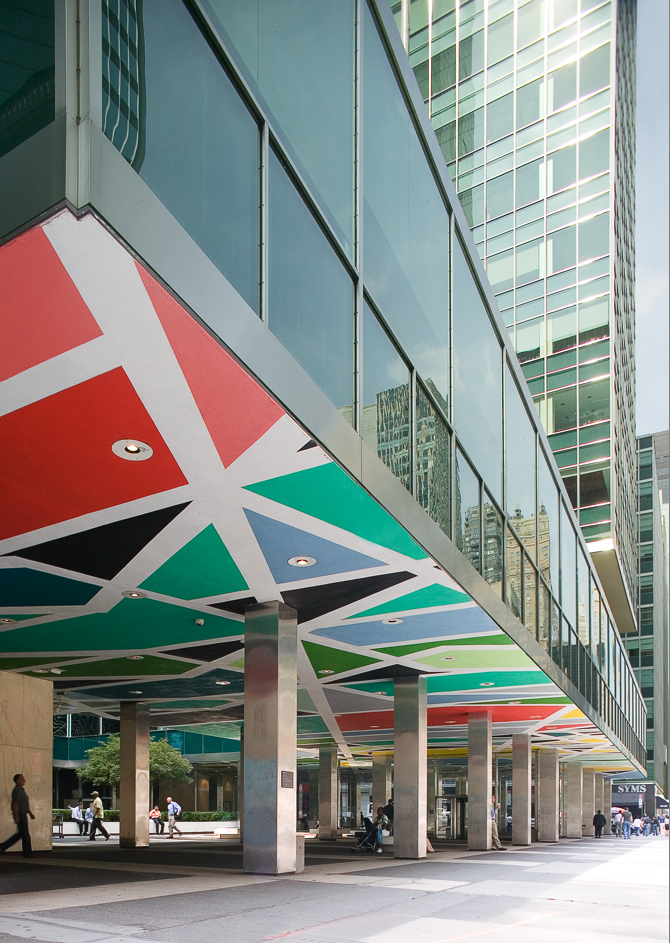
Robert Towne, 2006. Lever House, Manhattan

Morris's films have been characterized as portraits that focus on the psychology of individuals or cities. Her films about cities, like Midtown, Chicago, Los Angeles, and Rio depict urban scenes, capturing the architecture, politics, industry and leisure which define a specific place. Other films describe a place through the viewpoint of an individual, like psychologist Dr. George Sieber describing the terrorist event at the Olympic Stadium in Munich in the film 1972 or the industry politics of Hollywood from the viewpoint of screenwriter and producer in the eponymous film Robert Towne.

=== Exhibitions ===
She has shown internationally, with solo exhibitions at Hamburger Bahnhof in Berlin (2001), Palais de Tokyo in Paris (2005), Fondation Beyeler in Basel (2008), Museum für Moderne Kunst in Frankfurt (2009), Museo d’Arte Moderna di Bologna (2009), Musée National Fernand Léger in Biot (2012), M Museum, Leuven, Belgium (2015), Kunsthalle Wein, Vienna, Austria (2016), Espoo Museum of Modern Art, Espoo, Finland (2017), UCCA, Beijing, China (2018), Tai Kwun Contemporary, Hong Kong (2024)

Her mid-career retrospective titled "All Systems Fail" traveled to multiple cities and museums in 2023 and 2024 including: Deichtorhallen Hamburg, Germany , Kunstmuseen Krefeld, Germany , Zentrum Paul Klee, Bern, Switzerland and Kunstmuseum Stuttgart, Germany .

She has created site-specific works for various institutions including the Lever House, Kunsthalle Bremen in Germany, Kunstsammlung Nordrhein-Westfalen Museum, Düsseldorf, Germany, the lobby of UBS in New York City, the Gloucester Road tube station in London, the Metropolitan Transportation Authority, Dutch Kills / 39th Ave Subway Station, Ad-Diriyah Biennale in Riyadh, Saudi Arabia, St. Louis Lambert International Airport, General Dynamics Headquarters in Reston, Virginia, Tulsa Convention Center, Tulsa, Oklahoma, Gateway School for Sciences, Queens, New York, and Cleveland Clinic, Cleveland, Ohio, Key Biscayne Community Center, Key Biscayne, Florida.

Morris's films have been featured at the following:

- Ullens Center for Contemporary Art in Beijing (Entire filmography)
- Fondation Louis Vuitton in Paris (Strange Magic)
- Museum of Contemporary Art in Chicago (Chicago)
- Sotheby's in New York (Points on a Line)
- Barbican Centre in London (Beijing, Midtown)
- Guggenheim in New York (Midtown, AM/PM, Capital, Miami, Los Angeles)
- Centre Pompidou (Midtown, AM/PM, Capital, Miami, Los Angeles)
- M+ in Hong Kong (ETC)
- Locarno Film Festival, Locarno, Italy (Rio) Tribute

== Public collections ==
Kennedy Center (Capital) (2001), National Museum of Women in the Arts, Washington, D.C.

- Albright-Knox Art Gallery, Buffalo
- Berardo Collection, Sintra, Portugal
- Beyeler Foundation, Riehen, Switzerland
- British Council, London
- Centre d’Art Contemporain, Le Consortium, Dijon
- Centre Pompidou, Paris
- Cooper Hewitt Smithsonian Design Museum, New York
- Dallas Museum of Art, Dallas
- DekaBank, Frankfurt am Main
- Fondazione Prada, Milan, Italy
- Fondation Louis Vuitton, Paris
- F.R.A.C. Bourgogne, Dijon
- F.R.A.C. Poitou-Charentes
- Government Art Collection, London
- Solomon R. Guggenheim Museum, New York
- Hamburger Bahnhof, Museum fur Gegenwart, Berlin
- Jumex Museum, Ciudad de Mexico
- Kunsthalle Bremen, Bremen
- Kunstmuseum Wolfsburg, Wolfsburg
- Städtische Galerie im Lenbachhaus, Munich
- Luma Foundation, Arles, France
- Miami Art Museum
- Musee d’Art Moderne de la Ville de Paris
- Museum of Contemporary Art, Los Angeles
- Museum of Modern Art, New York
- Museum fur Moderne Kunst, Frankfurt
- M+, Hong Kong
- Nakanoshima Museum of Art, Osaka
- National Museum of Women in the Arts, Washington, D.C.
- National Gallery of Victoria, Melbourne
- Neue Nationalgalerie im Hamburger Bahnhof, Berlin
- Saastamoinen Foundation Art Collection
- Sammlung DaimlerChrysler, Berlin
- Stedelijk Museum, Amsterdam
- Tate Modern, London
- Yale Center for British Art, New Haven
- Victoria and Albert Museum, London
- UBS Art Collection, New York

== Filmography ==
- Midtown (1998)
- AM/PM (1999)
- Capital (2000)
- Miami (2002)
- Los Angeles (2004)
- Robert Towne (2006)
- 1972 (2008)
- Beijing (2008)
- Points on a Line (2010)
- Chicago (2011)
- Rio (2012)
- Strange Magic (2014)
- Abu Dhabi (2016)
- Finite and Infinite Games (2017)
- Sakura (2019)
- ETC (2024)

== Other activities ==
- Americans for the Arts, Member of the Artists Committee

== Origami lawsuit ==
In 2011 Morris was sued by a group of six origami artists, including American Robert J. Lang. They alleged that in 24 works (eventually discovered to be 33 or more) in her "Origami" series of paintings Morris had without permission or credit copied their original crease patterns, coloured them, and sold them as "found" or "traditional" designs. The case was settled out of court early in 2013; under the terms of the settlement, the creators of the crease patterns are to be given credit when the works are displayed.

List of affected paintings/models
Painting title	Year painted	Square painting edge sizes	Model title	Model composer
Angel	2009	214 cm	Harpy	Jason Ku
Bat	2007	214 cm	Bat	Noboru Miyajima
Black Ant	2009	214 cm	Harvestman (Phalangium)	Manuel Sirgo
Calypte Anna	2007	214 cm	Ruby-throated Hummingbird, opus 389	Robert J. Lang
Calypte Anna	2008	289 cm	Ruby-throated Hummingbird, opus 389	Robert J. Lang
Cat	2007	53.5 cm	Cat	Noboru Miyajima
Cat	2007	214 cm	Cat	Noboru Miyajima
Chaser	2008	214 cm	Dragonfly, opus 369	Robert J. Lang
Clerid Beetle	2009	214 cm	Scorpion (Buthus)	Manuel Sirgo
Crane	2008	214 cm	Dancing Crane, opus 460	Robert J. Lang
Cuttlefish	2009	214 cm	Sepia	Manuel Sirgo
Dragon	2007	214 cm	KNL Dragon, opus 132	Robert J. Lang
Falcon	2007	214 cm	Cooper’s Hawk, opus 464	Robert J. Lang
Falcon	2008	53.5 cm	Cooper’s Hawk, opus 464	Robert J. Lang
Goatfish	2007	152.5 cm	Goatfish, opus 202	Robert J. Lang
Grasshopper	2007	76.6 cm	Grasshopper, opus 83	Robert J. Lang
Grasshopper	2007	289 cm	Grasshopper, opus 83	Robert J. Lang
Hercules Beetle	2007	214 cm	Hercules Beetle, opus 271	Robert J. Lang
June Beetle	2009	214 cm	Cyclommatus metallifer	Nicola Bandoni
Kawasaki Cube	2008	53.5 cm	Kawasaki Cube #1	Toshikazu Kawasaki
Kawasaki Cube	2008	53.5 cm	Kawasaki Cube #1	Toshikazu Kawasaki
Kawasaki Cube	2008	214 cm	Kawasaki Cube #1	Toshikazu Kawasaki
Kawasaki Cube	2009	289 cm	Kawasaki Cube #1	Toshikazu Kawasaki
Leaf Mantis	2009	214 cm	Leaf Mantis	Manuel Sirgo
Lion	2007	214 cm	Lion	Noboru Miyajima
Mommoth	2007	53.5 cm	Mommoth	Noboru Miyajima
Mommoth	2007	214 cm	Mommoth	Noboru Miyajima
Mouse	2007	122 cm	Rat, opus 159	Robert J. Lang
Night Hawk	2008	214 cm	Stealth Fighter, opus 324	Robert J. Lang
Night Hunter	2007	214 cm	Night Hunter, opus 469	Robert J. Lang
Orchis	2008	214 cm	Orchid, opus 392	Robert J. Lang
Parrot	2009	214 cm	Macaw	Manuel Sirgo
Pegasus	2007	53.5 cm	Pegasus, opus 325	Robert J. Lang
Pegasus	2007	214 cm	Pegasus, opus 325	Robert J. Lang
Praying Mantis	2007	214 cm	Praying Mantis, opus 246	Robert J. Lang
Rabbit	2007	122 cm	Rabbit, opus 186	Robert J. Lang
Raccoon Dog	2007	122 cm	Raccoon Dog	Noboru Miyajima
Rhino Beetle	2008	214 cm	Eupatorus gracilicornus, opus 476	Robert J. Lang
Rockhopper	2007	20.8 cm	Penguin	Noboru Miyajima
Rockhopper	2007	122 cm	Penguin	Noboru Miyajima
Rockhopper	2009	289 cm	Penguin	Noboru Miyajima
Swan	2007	122 cm	Swan	Noboru Miyajima
Swan	2007	214 cm	Swan	Noboru Miyajima
Swan	2007	289 cm	Swan	Noboru Miyajima
Swan	2008	53.5 cm	Swan	Noboru Miyajima
Tarantula	2008	53.5 cm	Tarantula	Robert J. Lang
Tarantula	2008	214 cm	Tarantula	Robert J. Lang
Weasel	2007	76.6 cm	Weasel	Noboru Miyajima
Weasel	2007	214 cm	Weasel	Noboru Miyajima
Weasel	2008	122 cm	Weasel	Noboru Miyajima
Weasel	2008	289 cm	Weasel	Noboru Miyajima
Wolf	2007	289 cm	Wolf	Noboru Miyajima
