= Genome profiling =

Biotechnology that acquires genome information without sequencing

Genome profiling (GP) is a biotechnology that acquires genome information without sequencing. It can be used for identification and classification of organisms. It was pioneered by Japanese biophysicist Prof. Koichi Nishigaki and his colleagues at Saitama University in 1990 and later. The term 'DNA profiling' was changed to 'genome profiling' to avoid confusion, as the term 'DNA profiling' had begun to be used for a different technology in the field of forensics. In GP, small fragments of genomic DNA are randomly amplified (random PCR) and the random PCR products are subjected to temperature-gradient gel electrophoresis (TGGE) to generate a species-specific mobility pattern (genome profile). From this, species identification dots (spiddos) are assigned. This approach is clearly superior because it does not require prior knowledge of any gene sequence. It is clear that random PCR can produce commonly conserved genetic fragments (ccgf), which make it possible to measure the difference between organisms. The GP method has been successfully applied to a wide range of organisms, from viruses and bacteria to animals and plants, for identification and classification. Its unique merit is in the ultra-high performance to obtain the final results (identification and classification), since GP, in principle, requires only a single random PCR plus μTGGE experiment (~2 h task in all)

== Procedure and theory ==
The GP procedure is outlined in the following steps

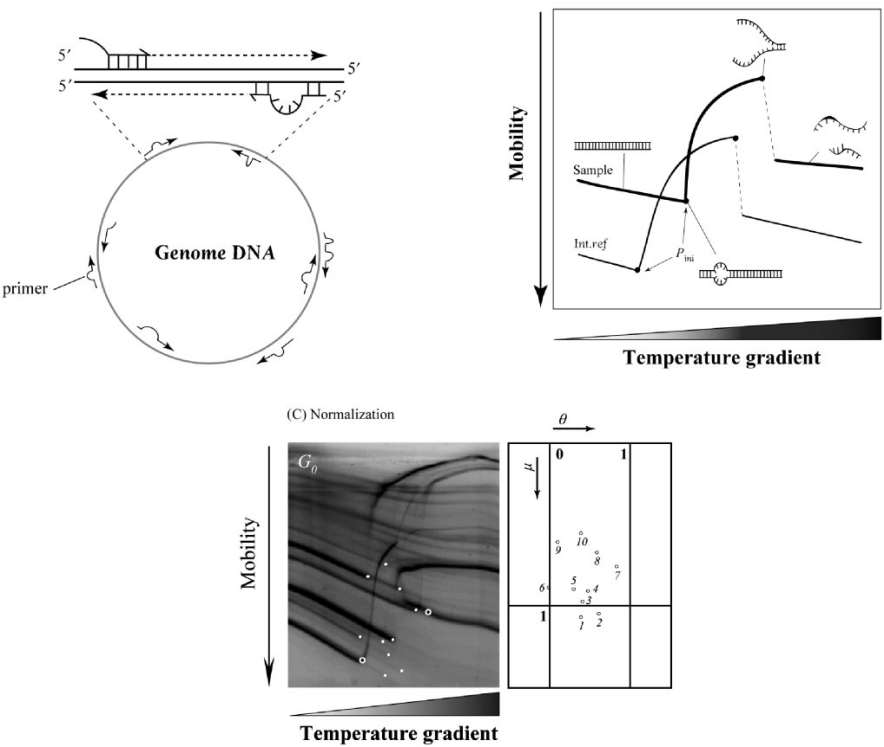
Whole process of GP: Beginning with random PCR which provides with DNA fragments from genomic DNA. Then, obtained DNAs are subjected to μTGGE where sequence-specific DNA melting profiles (genome profile) appear (schematically drawn; original photo in Panel C left). As increasing the temperature, DNA melting proceeds to: double-stranded, partially melted, and single-stranded depending on each DNA sequence. The initial melting point of each DNA is plotted (white dot) which is converted to spiddos (species identification dot(s): Panel C right) by use of internal references (shown in double circles in photo).

=== Random PCR ===
A set of genomic DNA and a single primer are subjected to a modified PCR operated at a lower annealing temperature (i.e. ~30 °C) than conventional PCR, allowing less stable template-primer hybrid structures to initiate the elongation reaction. Random PCR requires only a single short primer, whereas conventional PCR requires two types of primers (forward and reverse), and these sequences must be predetermined and specific to each template sequence. The primer pfM12 (dAGAACGCGCCTG) is known to be used universally for any kind of organism.

Although random PCR leads to the generation of DNA fragments that are not intentionally designed, the products are theoretically predictable based on knowledge of the template and primer sequences

=== Micro-TGGE (μTGGE) ===
Random PCR products are subjected to temperature-gradient gel electrophoresis to separate fragments by size and melting behavior. As the gel temperature increases, each double-stranded DNA fragment denatures (melts) at a specific temperature depending on its sequence. This causes a transition in mobility on the gel, resulting in a specific mobility pattern.

=== Spiddo extraction and analysis ===
Species identification dots (spiddos) are extracted from the genome profile as initial melting points for DNA bands. The positions of these bands are determined by the DNA sequence. In other words, spiddos are theoretically predictable and can be connected to the template sequence. Therefore, spiddos contain a type of information known as SIOWS (sequence-inherent information obtained without sequencing), which is unique and essential for GP technology based on DNA melting theory.

=== Genome distance ===
Using spiddo information, the difference between two genomes can be calculated in terms of pattern similarity score (PaSS). This parameter has been successfully used for species identification and classification, as well as for measuring the degree of mutation.

== Applications ==
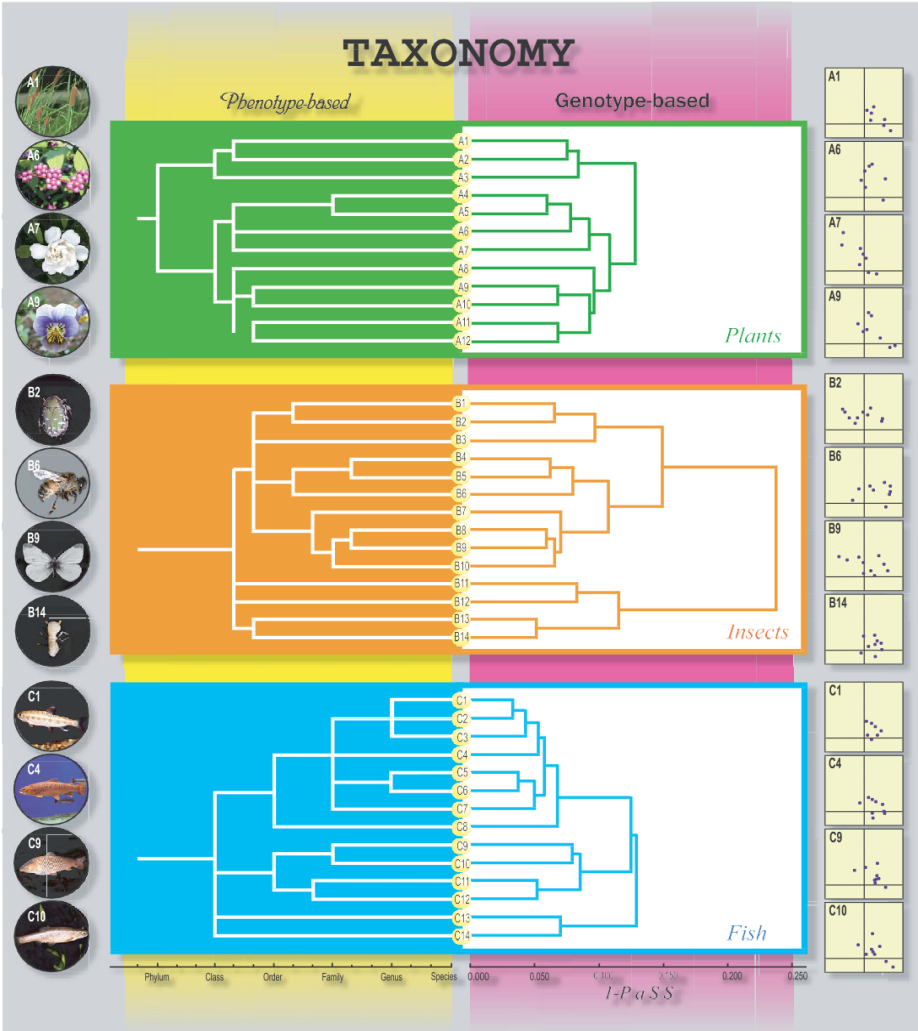
Application of GP in Taxonomy: Plants , insects, and fish are classified by GP (right half), showing excellent congruences with the classical phenotype-based taxonomic results (left half). Spiddos data are shown rightmost, which are ensemble of coordinate points determined by mobility- and melting temperature axes

GP has been applied to a variety of taxa, including viruses, bacteria, fungi, protozoa, insects, fish, animals and plants. An early study by Kouduka et al. reported the congruence between GP-based clustering and classical, phenotype-based taxonomy for insects, fish, and plants. Further investigation has revealed that insects can be more easily classified using GP than with traditional sequencing-based approaches, such as 18S rDNA sequencing. A GP-based genome database has been proposed and is ongoing, in which organisms are properly located in genome sequence space (the closer the similarity, the closer the distance).

GP has also been used to confirm the authenticity of fungal culture collections and to detect irreplaceable samples, such as single-celled protists, Radiolaria and Foraminifera, as well as forensic materials such as body fluids (blood, saliva and semen). For scientific purposes, GP has been used to discover continuous mutation of body cells, discriminate leaf origins from ambient trees and determine the family relationships of mice.

Utilizing the concept of genome distance, GP has been successfully implemented to detect mutagenic chemicals (mutagens). This technology is termed GPMA (GP-based mutation assay), in which a test organism, such as the bacterium Escherichia coli, is exposed to mutagenic (physical or chemical) reagents and investigated for sequence changes using genome distance.

== General remarks ==
GP is a unique genome analysis technique as it can acquire useful information (SIOWS: sequence-inherent information obtained without sequencing, expressed as spiddos) without the time-consuming process of DNA sequencing. GP is so simple that it can be performed using only basic random PCR and TGGE techniques with a single primer. Furthermore, GP is so universal that it can use the same primer (universal primer) for any organism, leading to the acquisition of the universal parameter, spiddos, which can be used to measure genome distance. Genome information can be compactly stored and utilized via spiddos in an internet database. If the entire GP procedure could be automated (currently, it involves a manual step), GP technology would be far easier to use and more accessible. On the other hand, the current system (PCR, TGGE, imager and computer) has the advantage of being inexpensive and able to be used for multiple purposes separately. In summary, in the age of next generation sequencing, when sophisticated and complicated procedures prevail, simple measures such as GP are complementary in importance.
