= Anomalous diffusion =

Diffusion process with a non-linear relationship to time

Mean squared displacement $\langle r^2(\tau)\rangle$ for different types of anomalous diffusion

Anomalous diffusion is a diffusion process with a non-linear relationship between the mean squared displacement (MSD), $\langle r^{2}(\tau )\rangle$, and time. This behavior is in stark contrast to Brownian motion, the typical diffusion process described by Albert Einstein and Marian Smoluchowski, where the MSD is linear in time (namely, $\langle r^{2}(\tau )\rangle =2dD\tau$ with d being the number of dimensions and D the diffusion coefficient). Extension of diffusion to a functional-diffusion is defined with a function of an observable, instead of tracking a single particle's trajectory, "meta-trajectory" as a function of an observable is tracked, such as the magnetization in the Ising model. Fractional diffusion equations were introduced in order to characterize anomalous diffusion phenomena.

Examples of anomalous diffusion in nature have been observed in ultra-cold atoms, harmonic spring-mass systems, scalar mixing in the interstellar medium, telomeres in the nucleus of cells, ion channels in the plasma membrane, colloidal particle in the cytoplasm, moisture transport in cement-based materials, and worm-like micellar solutions..

== Classes of anomalous diffusion ==
Unlike typical diffusion, anomalous diffusion is described by a power law,

$$\langle r^{2}(\tau )\rangle =K_\alpha\tau^\alpha\,$$

where $K_\alpha$ is the generalized diffusion coefficient with units $\mathrm{m^2\cdot s^{-\alpha}}$ and $\tau$ is the elapsed time. The classes of anomalous diffusions are classified as follows:

- α < 1: subdiffusion. This can happen due to crowding or walls. For example, a random walker in a crowded room, or in a maze, is able to move as usual for small random steps, but cannot take large random steps, creating subdiffusion. This appears for example in protein diffusion within cells, or diffusion through porous media. Subdiffusion has been proposed as a measure of macromolecular crowding in the cytoplasm.
- α = 1: Brownian motion.
- 1 < α < 2: superdiffusion. Superdiffusion can be the result of active cellular transport processes or due to jumps with a heavy-tail distribution.
- α = 2: ballistic motion. The prototypical example is a particle moving at constant velocity: $r = v\tau$.
- α > 2: hyperballistic. It has been observed in optical systems.

In 1926, using weather balloons, Lewis Fry Richardson demonstrated that the atmosphere exhibits super-diffusion. In a bounded system, the mixing length (which determines the scale of dominant mixing motions) is given by the von Kármán constant according to the equation $l_m={\kappa}z$, where $l_m$ is the mixing length, ${\kappa}$ is the von Kármán constant, and $z$ is the distance to the nearest boundary. Because the scale of motions in the atmosphere is not limited, as in rivers or the subsurface, a plume continues to experience larger mixing motions as it increases in size, which also increases its diffusivity, resulting in super-diffusion.

== Models ==
The types of anomalous diffusion given above allows one to measure the type. There are many possible ways to mathematically define a stochastic process which then has the right kind of power law. Some models are given here.

These are long range correlations between the signals continuous-time random walks (CTRW) and fractional Brownian motion (fBm), and diffusion in disordered media. Currently the most studied types of anomalous diffusion processes are those involving the following

- Generalizations of Brownian motion, such as the fractional Brownian motion and scaled Brownian motion
- Diffusion in fractals and percolation in porous media
- Continuous time random walks

These processes have growing interest in cell biophysics where the mechanism behind anomalous diffusion has direct physiological importance. Of particular interest, works by the groups of Eli Barkai, Maria Garcia-Parajo, Joseph Klafter, Diego Krapf, and Ralf Metzler have shown that the motion of molecules in live cells often show a type of anomalous diffusion that breaks the ergodic hypothesis. This type of motion require novel formalisms for the underlying statistical physics because approaches using microcanonical ensemble and Wiener–Khinchin theorem break down.

In 2021, Gorka Muñoz-Gil, Carlo Manzo and Giovanni Volpe started the AnDi Challenge to evaluate different methods to quantify anomalous diffusion. The second edition of the competition in 2024 further evaluated methods for detecting and quantifying changes in single-particle motion.

== See also ==
- Lévy flight – Random walk with heavy-tailed step lengths
- Random walk – Process forming a path from many random steps
- Percolation – Filtration of fluids through porous materials
- Long term correlations
- Long-range dependence – Phenomenon in linguistics and data analysis
- Hurst exponent – Measure of the long-range dependence of a time series
- Detrended fluctuation analysis (DFA) – Method to detect power-law scaling in time series
- Fractal – Infinitely detailed mathematical structure
