= Xenophilus arseniciresistens =

Scientific classification
- Domain: Bacteria
- Kingdom: Pseudomonadati
- Phylum: Pseudomonadota
- Class: Betaproteobacteria
- Order: Burkholderiales
- Family: Comamonadaceae
- Genus: Xenophilus
- Species: X. arseniciresistens

Binomial name
- Xenophilus arseniciresistens Li et al. 2014

Type strain
- CCTCC AB2012103, KACC 16853, YW8

Species of bacterium

Xenophilus arseniciresistens is a Gram-negative, aerobic, arsenite-resistant and motile bacterium from the genus Xenophilus which has been isolated from soil.
