= Xenophilus (bacterium) =

Scientific classification
- Domain: Bacteria
- Kingdom: Pseudomonadati
- Phylum: Pseudomonadota
- Class: Betaproteobacteria
- Order: Burkholderiales
- Family: Comamonadaceae
- Genus: Xenophilus; Blümel et al. 2001

Type species
- Xenophilus azovorans

Species
- X. aerolatus X. arseniciresistens X. azovorans

Genus of bacteria

Xenophilus is a genus of bacteria from the family Comamonadaceae.
