= John Montroll =

American origami artist (born 1960)

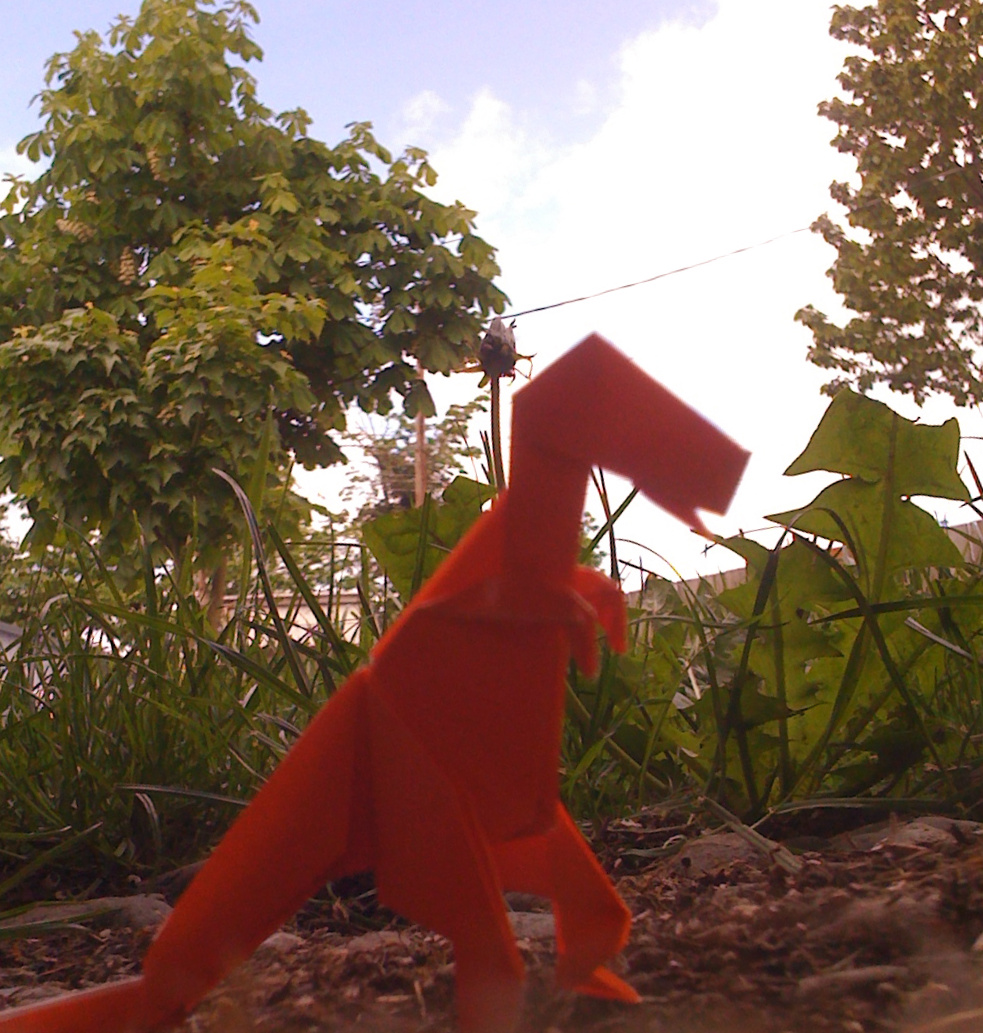
An origami Tyrannosaurus folded from Montroll's instructions

John Montroll (born January 1, 1960) is an American origami artist, author, teacher, and mathematician. He has written many books on origami, promoting the single-square, no-cut, no glue approach. Montroll taught mathematics at St. Anselm's Abbey School in Washington, D.C. from 1990 to 2021.

== Biography ==
John Montroll was born in Washington, D.C. He is the son of Elliott Waters Montroll, an American scientist and mathematician. He has a Bachelor of Arts degree in Mathematics from the University of Rochester, a Master of Arts in Electrical Engineering from the University of Michigan, and a Master of Arts in applied mathematics from the University of Maryland.

Montroll mastered his first origami book, Isao Honda's How to make Origami, at the age of six, the same age he began creating his own origami animals. He became a member of the Origami Center of America at age twelve. He attended his first origami convention at age 14. In 2021, Montroll retired from his job at St. Anselm's Abbey School in Washington, D.C., where he taught mathematics, as well as an origami class. One of John Montroll's hobbies is whistling. He claims to be able to whistle in five octaves and to have shown this talent at two whistling conventions in Louisburg, North Carolina.

John Montroll pioneered modern origami with the publication of his first book, Origami for the Enthusiast; Dover Publications, 1979, which was the first origami book where each model is folded from single square sheet and no cuts. In the same book he introduced the origami term "double rabbit ear fold." He is also known for inventing the "dog base". His work in the field of origami was briefly mentioned in the York series by author Laura Ruby.

== Publications ==
- Origami for the Enthusiast; Dover Publications, 1979 ISBN 0486237990
- Animal Origami for the Enthusiast; Dover Publications, 1985 ISBN 0486247929
- Origami American Style; Zenagraf, 1990 ISBN 0962725404
- Origami Sculptures (with Andrew Montroll); Antroll Pub. Co., 1990 ISBN 187765602X
- Origami Sea Life (with Robert J. Lang); Dover Publications, 1990 ISBN 0486267652
- Prehistoric Origami; Dover Publications, 1990 ISBN 0486265889
- African Animals in Origami; Dover Publications, 1991 ISBN 0486269779
- Easy Origami; Dover Publications, 1992 ISBN 0486272982
- Origami Inside-Out; Dover Publications, 1993 ISBN 0486276740
- Birds in Origami; Dover Publications, 1995 ISBN 0486283410
- North American Animals in Origami; Dover Publications, 1995 ISBN 0486286673
- Favorite Animals in Origami; Dover Publications, 1996 ISBN 0486291367
- Mythological Creatures and the Chinese Zodiac in Origami; Dover Publications, 1996 ISBN 0486289710
- Teach Yourself Origami; Dover Publications, 1998 ISBN 0486401413
- Bringing Origami to Life; Dover Publications, 1999 ISBN 0486407144
- Dollar Bill Animals in Origami; Dover Publications, 2000 ISBN 0486411575
- Bugs and Birds in Origami; Dover Publications, 2001 ISBN 0486417735
- A Plethora of Origami Polyhedra; Dover Publications, 2002 ISBN 0486422712
- Dollar Bill Origami; Dover Publications, 2003 ISBN 0486429822
- A Constellation of Origami Polyhedra; Dover Publications, 2004 ISBN 0486439585
- Origami: Birds And Insects; Dover Publications, 2004 ISBN 0486439720
- Origami: Wild Animals; Dover Publications, 2004 ISBN 0486439704
- Easy Christmas Origami; Dover Publications, 2006 ISBN 0486450244
- Christmas Origami; Dover Publications, 2006 ISBN 0486450252
- Storytime Origami; Dover Publications, 2009 ISBN 0486467864
- Origami Polyhedra Design; AK Peters, 2009 ISBN 1568814585
- eZ Origami; Kindle Edition by Antroll Publishing Company (April 17, 2010)
- eZ Origami; Smashwords Edition by eOrigami Publishing (May 8, 2010)
- Easy Dollar Bill Origami; Dover Publications (May 20, 2010), ISBN 0486470091
- Dinosaur Origami; Dover Publications (June 9, 2010), ISBN 0486477800
- Origami Jungle Birds; Kindle Edition by Antroll Publishing Company; 1 edition (June 16, 2010)
- Origami Under The Sea (with Robert J. Lang); Dover Publications (July 15, 2010) ISBN 0486477843
- Origami Dinosaurs for Beginners; Dover Publications, 2013, ISBN 0486498190
