= Origami Polyhedra Design =

2009 book

- Author: John Montroll
- Publisher: A K Peters
- Publication date: 2009

Origami Polyhedra Design is a book on origami designs for constructing polyhedra. It was written by the origami artist and mathematician John Montroll, and it was published in 2009 by A K Peters.

== Topics ==
There are two traditional methods for making polyhedra out of paper: polyhedral nets and modular origami. In the net method, the faces of the polyhedron are placed to form an irregular shape on a flat sheet of paper, with some of these faces connected to each other within this shape; it is cut out and folded into the shape of the polyhedron, and the remaining pairs of faces are attached together. In the modular origami method, many similarly-shaped "modules" are each folded from a single sheet of origami paper, and then assembled to form a polyhedron, with pairs of modules connected by the insertion of a flap from one module into a slot in another module. This book does neither of those two things. Instead, it provides designs for folding polyhedra, each out of a single uncut sheet of origami paper.

After a brief introduction to the mathematics of polyhedra and the concepts used to design origami polyhedra, book presents designs for folding 72 different shapes, organized by their level of difficulty. These include the regular polygons and the Platonic solids, Archimedean solids, and Catalan solids, as well as less-symmetric convex polyhedra such as dipyramids and non-convex shapes such as a "sunken octahedron" (a compound of three mutually-perpendicular squares). An important constraint used in the designs was that the visible faces of each polyhedron should have few or no creases; additionally, the symmetries of the polyhedron should be reflected in the folding pattern, to the extent possible, and the resulting polyhedron should be large and stable.

== Audience and reception ==
Reviewer Tom Hagedorn writes that "The book is well designed and organized and makes you want to start folding polyhedra," and that its instructions are "clear and easy to understand"; he recommends it to anyone interested in origami, polyhedra, or both. Reviewer Rachel Thomas recommends it to origami folders, to demonstrate to them the beauty of geometric forms, and to mathematicians, to show these forms in a new light and demonstrate the creativity of origami design. The book can also be used as a source for mathematical school projects, and to provide hands-on experience with geometry concepts such as length, angles, surface area, and volume; some of its designs are suitable for students as young as middle school, although others require more experience as an origami folder.

== See also ==
- List of books about polyhedra
