= Diego Krapf =

Argentine-Israeli physicist

- דיאגו קרפף
- Born: 21 November 1973 (age 52); Rosario, Argentina
- Education: Hebrew University of Jerusalem
- Known for: Anomalous diffusion; single-molecule biophysics
- Spouse: Susan Sasson
- Scientific career
- Fields: Biophysics
- Workplaces: Colorado State University
- Doctoral advisor: Amir Sa'ar
- Other academic advisors: Cees Dekker; Serge Lemay

Diego Krapf (Hebrew: דיאגו קרפף; born November 21, 1973) is an Argentine-Israeli-American physicist known for his work on anomalous diffusion and ergodicity breaking. He currently is a professor in the School of Biomedical and Chemical Engineering at Colorado State University.

== Early life and education ==
Diego Krapf was born on November 21, 1973, to Martha Elbert and Luis Krapf. He spent his childhood growing up in Rosario, Argentina, and he attended the Instituto Politécnico Superior.

In 1992, after finishing high school, Krapf immigrated to Israel, where he spent half a year in Kibbutz Gan Shmuel and then moved to Jerusalem. He enrolled in physics at the Hebrew University of Jerusalem.

Krapf holds a BSc in physics (1997), a MSc in applied physics (2000) and a PhD in applied physics (2004) from the Hebrew University of Jerusalem. After finishing his PhD, he completed a postdoc at the Delft University of Technology (2007), doing research in nanoelectrode fabrication and single molecule experiments using nanopores under the supervision of Cees Dekker and Serge Lemay.

== Research ==
Since 2007, Krapf is a faculty member in Colorado State University, where he currently heads a Biophysics lab that focuses on anomalous diffusion and cellular architecture using a combination of analytical and experimental tools including single particle tracking and super-resolution imaging.

In 2011, Krapf and his team at Colorado State University showed that the motion of membrane proteins on the surface of mammalian cells display anomalous diffusion with a non-ergodic underlying physical mechanism. These results represented a breakthrough in the understanding of membrane dynamics because they provide a completely new way of interpreting the motion of membrane proteins. In 2017, the Krapf lab discovered that due to complex branching processes the actin cytoskeleton adjacent to the plasma membrane of mammalian cells form an intricate fractal structure. In 2018, an international team led by Krapf involving researchers from the University of Massachusetts and the Instituto de Biología y Medicina Experimental (Argentina) revealed the organization of the actin-based cytoskeleton in the sperm flagellum using three-dimensional super-resolution imaging. It was discovered that in the midpiece of murine sperm, the actin cytoskeleton forms a double-helix that follows the mitochondrial sheath, a type of filamentous actin structure that had not been previously observed.

== Awards ==
- 2022 Art Corey Award for Outstanding International Contributions
- 2020 - 2021 George T. Abell Outstanding Research Faculty Award
- 2020 Dr. Bernardo Houssay Award of the Argentine Society of Biology
- 2019 César Milstein Award by the Ministry of Science, Technology and Productive Innovation, Argentina
- 2018 Interdisciplinary Scholarship Award, Colorado State University
- 2018 George T. Abell Outstanding Mid-Career Faculty Award
- 2000 Rector Scholarship, Hebrew University of Jerusalem
- 1999 Levy Eshkol Award, Israeli Ministry of Science and Technology, Israel
