= Continuous-time random walk =

Random walk with random time between jumps

In mathematics, a continuous-time random walk (CTRW) is a generalization of a random walk where the wandering particle waits for a random time between jumps. It is a stochastic jump process with arbitrary distributions of jump lengths and waiting times. More generally it can be seen to be a special case of a Markov renewal process.

== Motivation ==
CTRW was introduced by Montroll and Weiss as a generalization of physical diffusion processes to effectively describe anomalous diffusion, i.e., the super- and sub-diffusive cases. An equivalent formulation of the CTRW is given by generalized master equations. A connection between CTRWs and diffusion equations with fractional time derivatives has been established. Similarly, time-space fractional diffusion equations can be considered as CTRWs with continuously distributed jumps or continuum approximations of CTRWs on lattices.

== Formulation ==
A simple formulation of a CTRW is to consider the stochastic process $X(t)$ defined by

$$X(t) = X_0 + \sum_{i=1}^{N(t)} \Delta X_i,$$

whose increments $\Delta X_i$ are iid random variables taking values in a domain $\Omega$ and $N(t)$ is the number of jumps in the interval $(0,t)$. The probability for the process taking the value $X$ at time $t$ is then given by

$$P(X,t) = \sum_{n=0}^\infty P(n,t) P_n(X).$$

Here $P_n(X)$ is the probability for the process taking the value $X$ after $n$ jumps, and $P(n,t)$ is the probability of having $n$ jumps after time $t$.

== Montroll–Weiss formula ==
We denote by $\tau$ the waiting time in between two jumps of $N(t)$ and by $\psi(\tau)$ its distribution. The Laplace transform of $\psi(\tau)$ is defined by

$$\tilde{\psi}(s)=\int_0^{\infty} d\tau \, e^{-\tau s} \psi(\tau).$$

Similarly, the characteristic function of the jump distribution $f(\Delta X)$ is given by its Fourier transform:

$$\hat{f}(k)=\int_\Omega d(\Delta X) \, e^{i k\Delta X} f(\Delta X).$$

One can show that the Laplace–Fourier transform of the probability $P(X,t)$ is given by

$$\hat{\tilde{P}}(k,s) = \frac{1-\tilde{\psi}(s)}{s} \frac{1}{1-\tilde{\psi}(s)\hat{f}(k)}.$$

The above is called the Montroll–Weiss formula.

== Examples ==
The homogeneous Poisson point process is a continuous time random walk with exponential holding times and with each increment deterministically equal to 1.
