= Roger Wartell =

Roger M. Wartell
- Born: New York, New York
- Education: Stevens Institute of Technology; University of Rochester
- Known for: Development of TGGE
- Scientific career
- Fields: RNA Based Regulation of Gene Expression
- Workplaces: Georgia Tech
- Doctoral advisor: Elliott Waters Montroll

Roger Martin Wartell is the former chair of the school of biology, part of the College of Sciences at the Georgia Institute of Technology.

== Biography ==
=== Early life ===
Roger Wartell was born in New York, New York. He received his B.S. degree in physics from Stevens Institute of Technology in 1966. In 1971 he received his Ph.D. in physics from the University of Rochester, where he worked in the group of Elliott Waters Montroll on the DNA helix-coil transition. From 1971 to 1973 he was a NIH postdoctoral fellow in the laboratory of Robert Wells at the University of Wisconsin-Madison. He was a visiting professor at the University of Wisconsin-Madison in 1978–1979, and visiting scholar at National Institutes of Health-Bethesda from 1987 to 1988.

=== Georgia Tech ===
Wartell joined the faculty at Georgia Tech in 1974, and received a NIH Career Development Award in 1979. He served as associate chair of the Georgia Institute of Technology School of Physics from 1987 to 1988. With a 1/3 joint appointment in biology, he was appointed acting chair of the Georgia Tech School of Biology in 1990. Under his tenure as chair (1990–2004), the undergraduate curriculum was revised to provide students with three areas of emphasis: environmental biology, microbiology, and molecular biology and faculty size increased from 12 to 26. The areas reflected the research and educational interests of the faculty.

He is a member of the NASA Astrobiology Institute at Georgia Tech. His research is focused on protein-RNA interactions in gene regulation, ribosomal evolution, and ribozyme reactions in ice.

== Notable awards ==
- NIH Career Development Award, 1979.

== Notable publications ==
- Jain, K.; Updegrove, T. B.; Wartell, R. M. (2011). "A Thermodynamic Perspective of sRNA-mRNA Interactions and the Role of Hfq". Frontiers in Nucleic Acids. ACS Symposium Series. Vol. 1082. p. 111. doi:10.1021/bk-2011-1082.ch007. ISBN 978-0-8412-2623-4.
- Wartell, R. M.; Benight, A. S. (1985). "Thermal denaturation of DNA molecules: A comparison of theory with experiment". Physics Reports. 126 (2): 67–107. Bibcode:1985PhR...126...67W. doi:10.1016/0370-1573(85)90060-2.
- Sun, X.; Zhulin, I.; Wartell, R. (2002). "Predicted structure and phyletic distribution of the RNA-binding protein Hfq". Nucleic Acids Research. 30 (17): 3662–3671. doi:10.1093/nar/gkf508. PMC 137430. PMID 12202750.
