= Michael F. Shlesinger =

- Michael F. Shlesinger in 2006 on the occasion of receiving the Saalfeld Award
- Born: August 8, 1948 (age 78); Brooklyn, New York
- Education: University of New York at Stony Brook; University of Rochester
- Known for: Fractal time Nonlinear dynamics
- Awards: Saalfeld Award Weisskopf Medal
- Scientific career
- Workplaces: University of Maryland, College Park; ONR; US Naval Academy
- Doctoral advisor: Elliott Waters Montroll

Michael F. Shlesinger (born August 8, 1948 in Brooklyn, New York) is a physicist notable for his work in the area of nonlinear dynamics. He is the co-founder of the journal Fractals. His pioneering work in statistical predictions and descriptions of random and deterministic processes has influenced the physics of amorphous solids and glasses, classical mechanics, and biophysics. He is known as a proponent of fractal time and is also known for his work on fractal stochastic processes related to areas such as disordered materials and turbulence.

He has a son named Ben who has two daughters.

== Education ==
In 1970, Shlesinger obtained his BS degree in physics and mathematics from State University of New York at Stony Brook, and obtained his MA in 1972 from the University of Rochester. In 1975, he obtained his PhD from the University of Rochester under Elliott Waters Montroll for a thesis titled A Stochastic Theory of Anomalous Transient Photocurrents in Certain Xerographic Films and of the 1/f Noise in Neural Membrane.

== Career ==
Initially he worked at the University of Maryland, College Park. In 1983, he joined Office of Naval Research (ONR) and started their nonlinear dynamics program in 1984. He went on to head their physics division, before being named ONR's chief scientist for nonlinear science. His contributions to nonlinear dynamics and statistical physics include the publication of over 200 papers, editorship of over 20 books, and the organization of over 30 conferences. In 2008, he took up the Kinnear Chair in Physics at the US Naval Academy, Annapolis, United States. In 2021, he published An Unbounded Experience in Random Walks with Applications (World Scientific Pub). In 2024 he published the book "Why Not Nonlinear Algebra" about his 40 year career at ONR.

== Honors ==
Shlesinger was elected as a fellow of the American Physical Society in 1993. In 2004, he received the Presidential Rank Award. In 2006, he received ONR's Saalfeld Award for outstanding lifetime achievement. In 2008, he was honored with a festschrift to mark his 60th birthday, entitled 25 Years of Nonlinear Dynamics at ONR, based on a conference held on Amelia Island, Florida, July 20–22, 2008.

== Name ==
His middle name is the single initial "F"—he does not have a full middle name; another famous example of this is the middle initial of Harry S. Truman.

== See also ==
- Fractal time
- Nonlinear dynamics

== Bibliography ==
- Shlesinger, M. F. (18 September 1987). "Fractal time and 1/f noise in complex systems". Annals of the New York Academy of Sciences. 504 (1): 214–228. Bibcode:1987NYASA.504..214S. doi:10.1111/j.1749-6632.1987.tb48734.x. PMID 3477117. S2CID 83594835.
- Shlesinger, M. F. (1 July 1987). "Fractal Time and 1/f Noise in Complex Systems". Annals of the New York Academy of Sciences. 504 (1 Perspectives): 214–228. Bibcode:1987NYASA.504..214S. doi:10.1111/j.1749-6632.1987.tb48734.x. PMID 3477117. S2CID 83594835.
- Shlesinger, M. F. (1 October 1988). "Fractal Time in Condensed Matter". Annual Review of Physical Chemistry. 39 (1): 269–290. Bibcode:1988ARPC...39..269S. doi:10.1146/annurev.pc.39.100188.001413.
- Shlesinger, M. F. (1 October 1988). "Fractal Time in Condensed Matter". Annual Review of Physical Chemistry. 39 (1): 269–290. Bibcode:1988ARPC...39..269S. doi:10.1146/annurev.pc.39.100188.001413.
- "Michael F. Shlesinger - Google Scholar Citations". scholar.google.com.
- "Michael F. Shlesinger - Office of Naval Research, Arlington". ResearchGate.
