= Xenophilus aerolatus =

Scientific classification
- Domain: Bacteria
- Kingdom: Pseudomonadati
- Phylum: Pseudomonadota
- Class: Betaproteobacteria
- Order: Burkholderiales
- Family: Comamonadaceae
- Genus: Xenophilus
- Species: X. aerolatus

Binomial name
- Xenophilus aerolatus Kim et al. 2010

Type strain
- DSM 19424, KACC 12602, 5516S-2

Synonyms
- Xenophilus aerolata

Species of bacterium

Xenophilus aerolatus is a Gram-negative, aerobic, rod-shaped and motile bacterium from the genus Xenophilus which has been isolated from air from Suwon in Korea.
