= Ardara =

Ardara may refer to:

- Ardara, Sardinia, Italy, a comune (municipality)
- Ardara, County Donegal, Ireland, a small town
- Ardara Road Halt railway station, County Donegal, Ireland, a former station
- Ardara, Pennsylvania, United States, a coal mining ghost town, and an unincorporated community on the outskirts of Pittsburgh
