= Elliott Waters Montroll =

American mathematician

Elliott W. Montroll
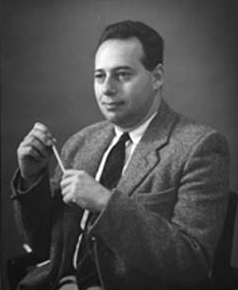
- Elliott Waters Montroll (1916–1983)
- Born: May 4, 1916; Pittsburgh, Pennsylvania, United States
- Died: December 3, 1983 (aged 67); Chevy Chase, Maryland, United States
- Education: University of Pittsburgh
- Known for: Traffic flow analysis, Continuous-time random walk
- Awards: Lanchester Prize (1959)
- Scientific career
- Fields: Mathematician
- Workplaces: Yale University; Cornell University; Princeton University; Kellex Corporation; Polytechnic Institute of Brooklyn; Office of Naval Research; Courant Institute; University of Maryland; Thomas J. Watson Research Center; Institute for Defense Analysis; University of Rochester
- Doctoral advisor: James Sturdevant Taylor
- Doctoral students: Michael F. Shlesinger; Leopoldo García-Colín; Roger Wartell

Notes
- He is the father of John Montroll.

Elliott Waters Montroll (May 4, 1916, in Pittsburgh, Pennsylvania – December 3, 1983, in Chevy Chase, Maryland) was an American scientist and mathematician.

== Education ==
Elliott Montroll was born on May 4, 1916, in Pittsburgh, Pennsylvania, and received his elementary and high school education at the Dormont Public Schools. In 1933 he entered the University of Pittsburgh and in 1937 he received a BS degree in chemistry. From 1937 until 1939 he was a graduate assistant in the Mathematics Department of the University of Pittsburgh, and during the first semester of the school year 1939–1940 he carried out research in the Chemistry Department of Columbia University. He was awarded a Ph.D. in mathematics at the University of Pittsburgh in 1939, with a thesis Some Notes and Applications of the Characteristic Value Theory of Integral Equations in which he applied integral equations to the study of imperfect gases. A paper published jointly with Joseph E. Mayer in 1941 Statistical mechanics of imperfect gases also examined ideas developing out of his thesis.

== Career ==
Montroll had an exceptionally varied career: was a Sterling Research Fellow at Yale University where his work on the Ising model of a ferromagnet led him to solve certain Markov chain problems. Following this he was a research associate at Cornell University in 1941–42, where he began his studies of the problem of finding the frequency spectrum of elastic vibrations in crystal lattices. During 1942–43 Montroll was an instructor in physics at Princeton University.

In 1943, Montroll was appointed as head of the Mathematics Research Group at the Kellex Corporation in New York, working on programs associated with the Manhattan Project. In 1944 he went to the Polytechnic Institute of Brooklyn, as adjunct professor of chemistry, then in 1946 he returned to the University of Pittsburgh as assistant, and then associate, professor of physics and mathematics. During this time he also served as head of the Physics Branch of the Office of Naval Research from 1948 to 1950. In 1950 he was appointed as a research fellow at the Courant Institute in New York. In 1951 he was appointed Research Professor in the Institute for Fluid Dynamics and Applied Mathematics at the University of Maryland.

However, in 1960, he took the post of Director of General Sciences at the IBM Thomas J. Watson Research Center in Yorktown Heights, New York. In 1963 he held the position of Vice President for Research at the Institute for Defense Analysis in Washington, D.C.

In 1966, he returned to the academic world as 'Albert Einstein Professor of Physics, and the Director of the Institute for Fundamental Studies, at the University of Rochester. Montroll stayed at the University of Rochester until 1981. After retirement, he accepted two further positions, one back at the University of Maryland and the other at the University of California, Irvine

== Honors ==
He was elected to the National Academy of Sciences (United States) in 1969, and to the American Academy of Arts and Sciences in 1973. His work on traffic flow led to him winning (jointly) the Lanchester Prize of the Operations Research Society of America in 1959.

== Personal life ==
He was married to Shirley Abrams on May 7, 1943. He was the father of ten including John Montroll. Has one sister Madelyn Montroll. Now Madelyn Todd.
