= Robert J. Lang =

American physicist (born 1961)

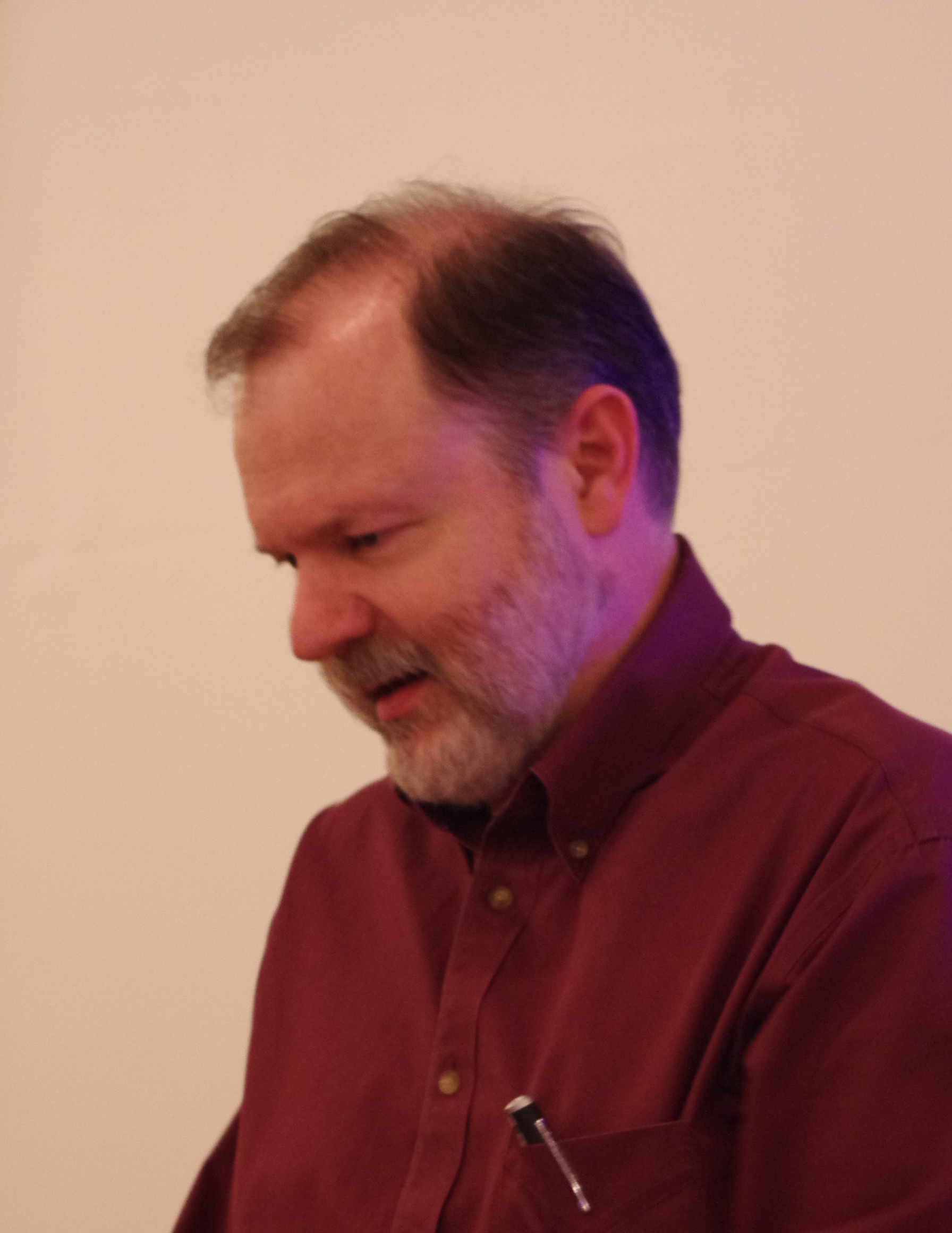
- Lang in 2012
- Born: May 4, 1961 (age 65); Dayton, Ohio, U.S.
- Education: California Institute of Technology; Stanford University
- Known for: Mathematics of origami
- Scientific career
- Fields: Optoelectronics, physics, mathematics
- Workplaces: NASA

Robert James Lang (born May 4, 1961) is an American physicist who is also one of the foremost origami artists and theorists in the world. He is known for his complex and elegant designs, most notably of insects and animals. He has studied the mathematics of origami and used computers to study the theories behind origami. He has made great advances in making real-world applications of origami to engineering problems.

== Education and early occupation ==
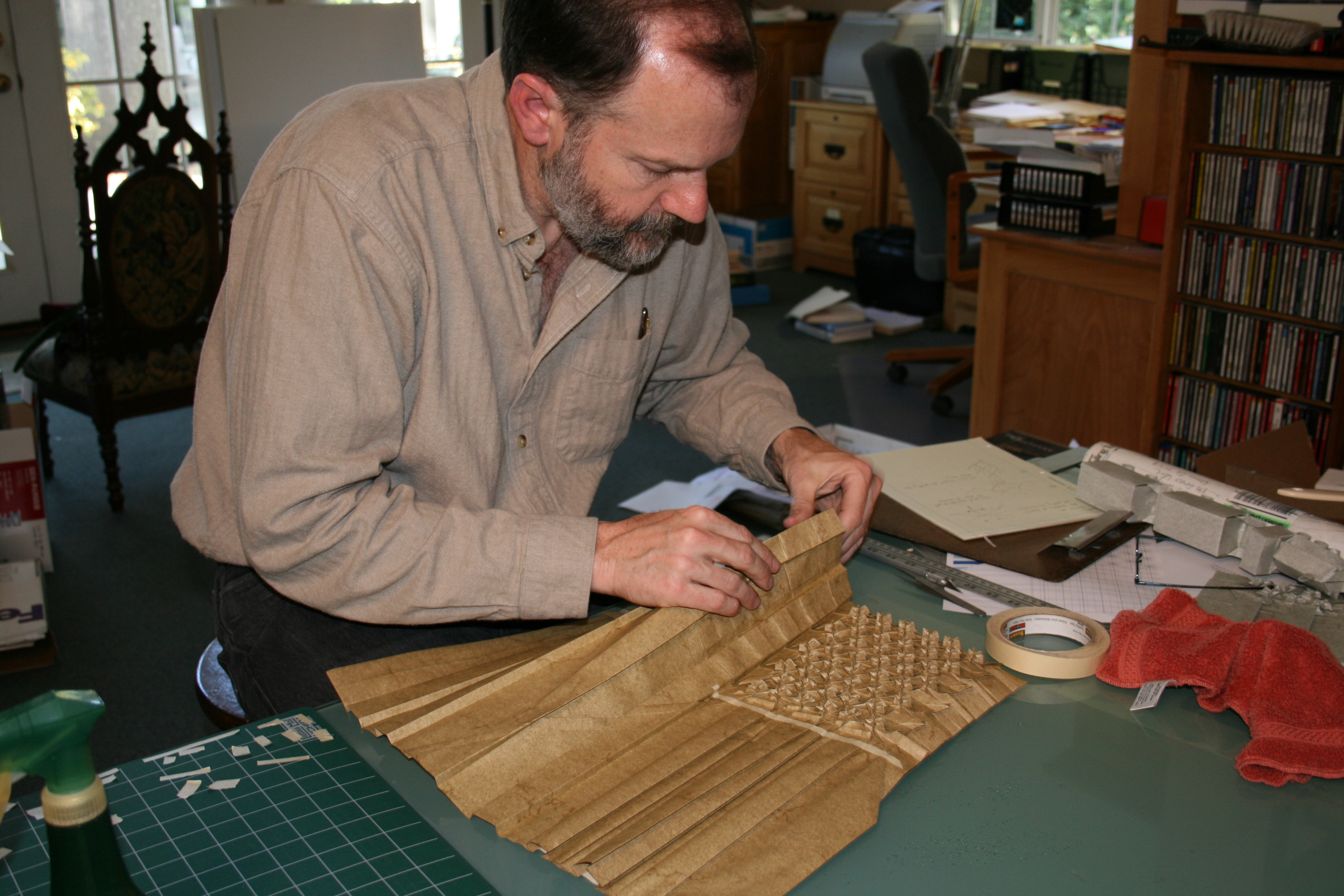
Robert Lang folding an origami American flag, which includes 50 stars and 13 stripes, from a single uncut square

Lang was born in Dayton, Ohio, and grew up in Atlanta, Georgia. Lang studied electrical engineering at the California Institute of Technology, where he met his wife-to-be, Diane. He earned a master's degree in electrical engineering at Stanford University in 1983, and returned to Caltech for a Ph.D. in applied physics, with a dissertation titled Semiconductor Lasers: New Geometries and Spectral Properties.

Lang began work for NASA's Jet Propulsion Laboratory in 1988. Lang also worked as a research scientist for Spectra Diode Labs of San Jose, California, and then at JDS Uniphase, also of San Jose.

Lang has authored or co-authored over 80 publications on semiconductor lasers, optics, and integrated optoelectronics, and holds 46 patents in these fields. In 2001, Lang left the engineering field to be a full-time origami artist and consultant. However, he still maintains ties to his physics background: he was the editor-in-chief of the IEEE Journal of Quantum Electronics from 2007 to 2010, and has done part-time laser consulting for Cypress Semiconductor, among others. Lang currently resides in Altadena, California. In January 2025, both Lang's residence and studio burned down during the Eaton Fire.

== Origami ==
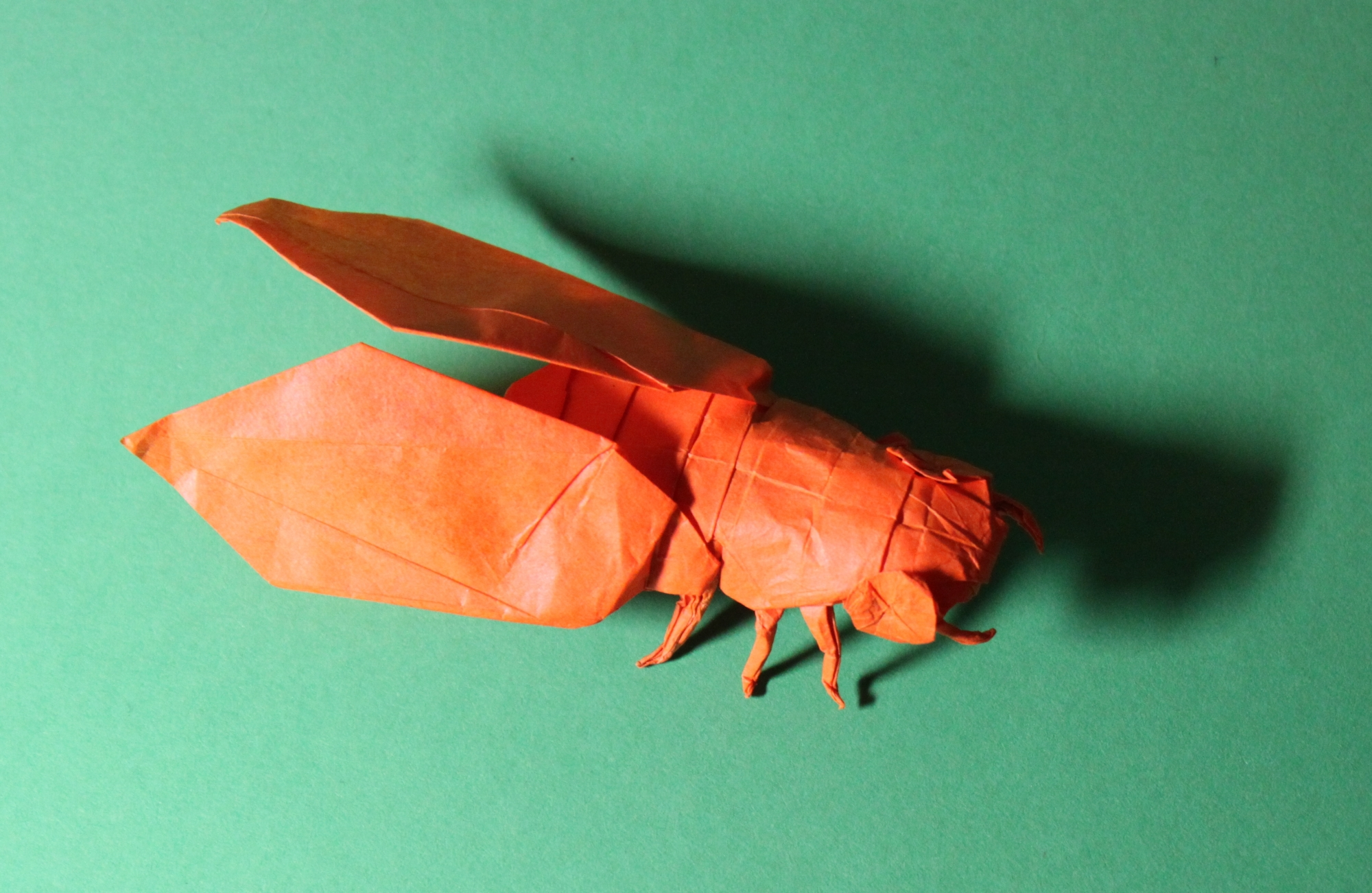
Cicada by Lang

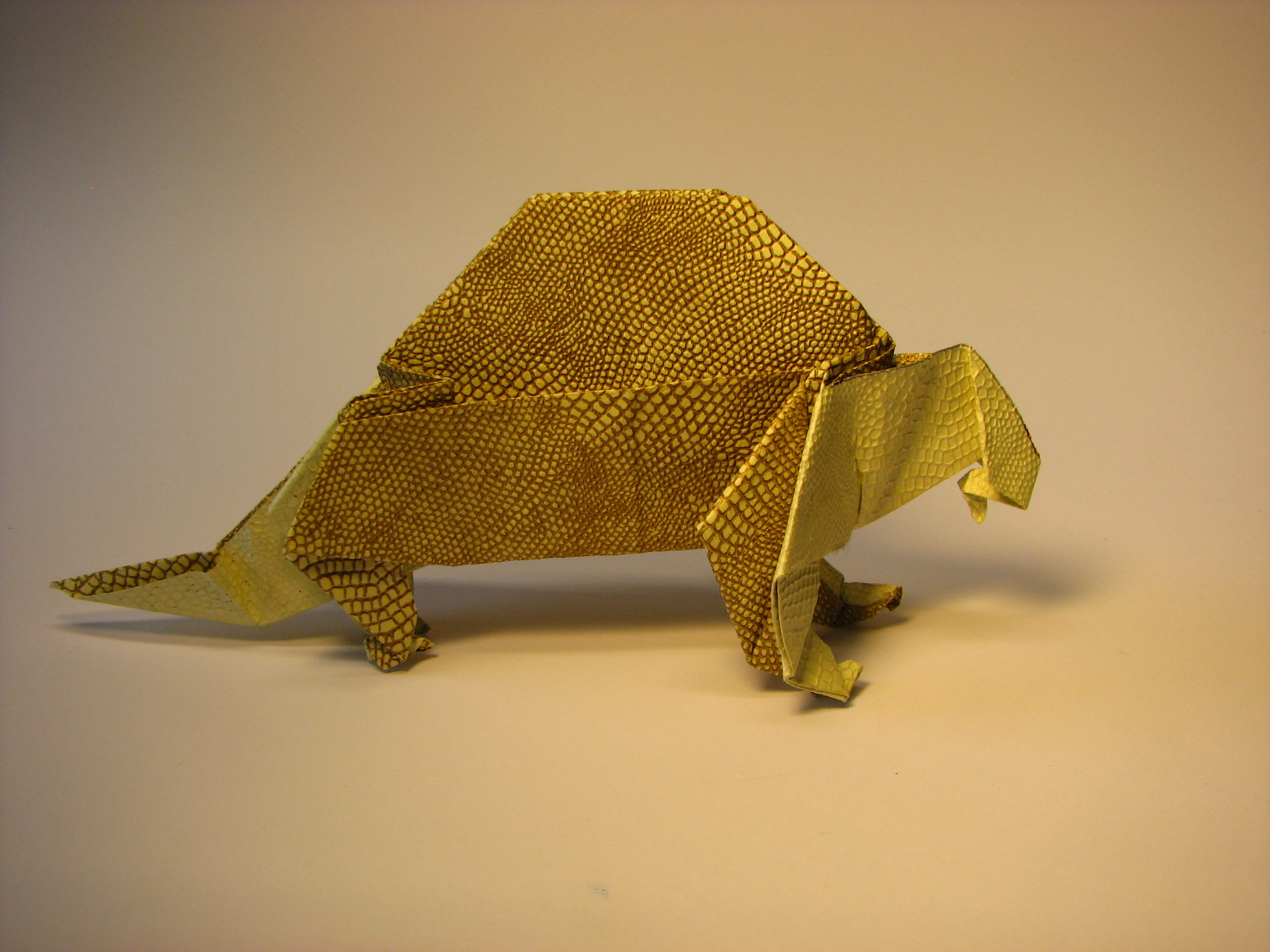
Dimetrodon by Lang

Lang was introduced to origami at the age of six by a teacher who had exhausted other methods of keeping him entertained in the classroom. By his early teens, he was designing original origami patterns. Lang used origami as an escape from the pressures of undergraduate studies. While studying at Caltech, Lang came into contact with other origami masters such as Michael LaFosse, John Montroll, Joseph Wu, and Paul Jackson through the Origami Center of America, now known as OrigamiUSA.

While in Germany for postdoctoral work, Lang and his wife were enamored of Black Forest cuckoo clocks, and he became a sensation in the origami world when he successfully folded one after three months of design and six hours of actual folding.

In 1990, Lang first attempted to write computer code that would solve origami problems, and the result was his first version of Tree Maker. Lang takes full advantage of modern technology in his origami, including using a laser cutter to help score paper for complex folds.

Lang is recognized as one of the leading theorists of the mathematics of origami. He has developed ways to algorithmetize the design process for origami, and is the author of the proof of the completeness of the Huzita–Hatori axioms.

Lang specializes in finding real-world applications for the various theories of origami he has developed. These included designing folding patterns for a German airbag manufacturer. He has worked with the Lawrence Livermore National Laboratory in Livermore, California, where a team is developing a powerful space telescope, with a 100 m (328 ft) lens in the form of a thin membrane. Lang was engaged by the team to develop a way to fit the tremendous lens, known as the Eyeglass, into a small rocket in such a way that the lens can be unfolded in space and will not suffer from any permanent marks or creases. Lang is the author or co-author of eight books and many articles on origami. Lang also designed the Google Doodle for Akira Yoshizawa's 101st birthday, which was used by Google on March 14, 2012.

== Awards and honors ==
In 2012 he became a fellow of the American Mathematical Society.

== Bibliography ==
- The Complete Book of Origami; Dover Publications, 1988, ISBN 0-553-38016-8
- Origami Zoo (with Stephen Weiss); St. Martin's Press, 1989, ISBN 0-312-04015-6
- Origami Sea Life (with John Montroll); Dover Publications, 1990, ISBN 0-486-26765-2
- Origami Animals; Crescent, 1992 (out of print), ISBN 0-517-07320-X OCLC 439612324
- Origami Insects and their Kin; Dover Publications, 1995, ISBN 0-486-28602-9
- Origami in Action; St. Martin's Press, 1996, ISBN 0-312-15618-9
- Origami Design Secrets: Mathematical Methods for an Ancient Art; A K Peters, 2003, ISBN 1-56881-194-2
- Twists, Tilings, and Tessellations: Mathematical Methods for Geometric Origami; CRC Press, 2018, ISBN 9781482262414

== See also ==
- Napkin folding problem
