= Electropherogram =

Laboratory technique

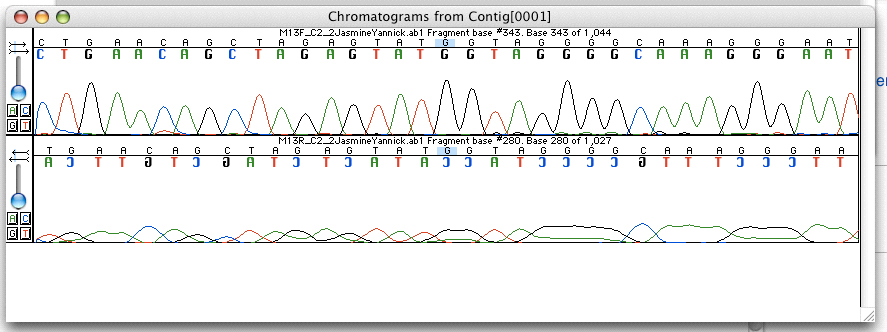
Screenshot of a chromatogram inside the program "Sequencher"

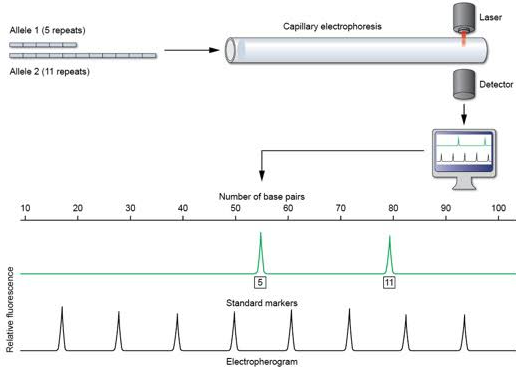
Capillary Electrophoresis to Electropherogram process (Courtesy of www.biointeractive.org)

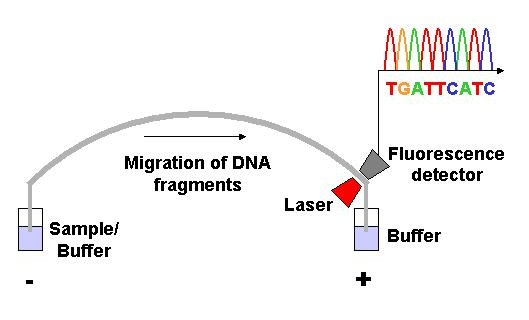
Generation of results

An electropherogram (also called electrophoretogram, sequencing chromatogram, EPG, and e-gram) is a record or chart produced when electrophoresis is used in an analytical technique, primarily in the fields of forensic biology, molecular biology, and biochemistry. The method plots data points that represent a specific time and fluorescence intensity at various wavelengths of light to represent a DNA profile.

In the field of genetics, an electropherogram is a plot of DNA fragment sizes, typically used for genotyping such as DNA sequencing. The data is plotted with time, shown via base pairs (bps), on the x-axis and fluorescence intensity on the y-axis. Such plots are often achieved using an instrument such as an automated DNA sequencer paired with capillary electrophoresis (CE). Such electropherograms may be used to determine DNA sequence genotypes, or genotypes that are based on the length of specific DNA fragments or number of short tandem repeats (STR) at a specific locus by comparing the sample to internal size standards and allelic ladder data using the same size standard. These genotypes can be used for:

- genealogical DNA testing
- DNA paternity testing
- DNA profiling
- phylogenetics
- population genetics

== See also ==
- Gel electrophoresis of nucleic acids
- Chromatography
