= Amplified Ribosomal DNA Restriction Analysis =

Amplified rDNA (Ribosomal DNA) Restriction Analysis is the extension of the technique of RFLP (restriction fragment length polymorphism) to the gene encoding the small (16s) ribosomal subunit of bacteria. The technique involves an enzymatic amplification using primers directed at the conserved regions at the ends of the 16s gene, followed by digestion using tetracutter Restriction enzymes. The pattern obtained is said to be representative of the species analysed. Patterns obtained from several restriction enzymes can be used to phylogenetically characterize cultured isolates and 16s genes obtained through cloning from community DNA

== ARDRA rationale and procedure ==
Vaneechoutte et al., were among the first to use this method and applied it to characterize Mycobacterium species and Acinetobacter species Numerous other studies have applied ARDRA for different bacterial taxa. Because it targets the comparatively conserved 16s ribosomal gene, ARDRA is fast and cost-effective for comparing community fingerprints, but its discriminatory power is limited and multiple restriction enzymes may be needed to obtain adequate resolution. Based on the simple formula for the frequency of random occurrence of a Restriction site, a 4-bp sequence can occur once every 256 bp. A restriction enzyme having a recognition site of more than 4 bp would be irrelevant with respect to a gene of approximately 1500 bp such as that coding for the 16s ribosomal subunit. A number of tetracutter Restriction enzymes are available in the market. For the sake of statistical significance, at least three restriction enzymes must be used for the analysis to overcome the probability of certain restriction enzymes to yield similar patterns for not so unrelated organisms.

The amplicon to be analysed must preferably correspond to a size of greater than 1000 bp, purely for the sake of encountering a greater possibility of the restriction site. The amplicons must be preferably purified before digestion. This can be done by numerous commercially available purification kits. Care should be taken to choose the restriction enzymes. Certain restriction enzymes recognize the same sites, and cannot contribute productively to the analysis. Overnight digestion (10–16 hours) of about 300-500 ng of amplicon DNA in a 20 μL system with 4-5 units of Restriction Enzyme along with the recommended buffer at the prescribed temperature is recommended. Following digestion, the reaction is stopped and the entire digest run in a 2-3% agarose gel at 90-100 V. The gel should be of a length that would allow proper resolution of minor fragments, as small as 100–200 bp.

Analysis of the patterns is done with methods used for RAPD patterns. Clusters of related bacteria can be represented in the form of a cladogram or phylogram. After initial analysis a multivariate analysis program such as NT-SYS or PAST furnishing details about the presence or absence of bands, marked as 1(for presence) and 0(for absence). The data can be subsequently used for generating a phylogram or cladogram. The data table can be used to plot a phylogenetic tree that would indicate the relationship of the organisms based on the restriction pattern obtained from their respective 16s genes. Commercial software is also available for the analysis of these patterns, most used are the packages GelCompar II and BioNumerics.
