= Ribosomal intergenic spacer analysis =

Ribosomal RNA (rRNA) intergenic spacer analysis (RISA) is a method of microbial community analysis that provides a means of comparing differing environments or treatment impacts without the bias imposed by culture-dependent approaches. RISA involves PCR amplification of a region of the rRNA gene operon between the small (16S) and large (23S) subunits called the intergenic spacer region ISR.

By using oligonucleotide primers targeted to conserved regions in the 16S and 23S genes, RISA fragments can be generated from most of the dominant bacteria in an environmental sample. While the majority of the rRNA operon serves a structural function, portions of the 16S-23S intergenic region can encode tRNAs depending on the bacterial species. However the taxonomic value of the ISR lies in the significant heterogeneity in both length and nucleotide sequence. In RISA, we attempt to exploit the length heterogeneity of the ISR, which has been shown to range between 150 and 1500 bp with the majority of the ISR lengths being between 150 and 500 bp.

The resulting PCR product will be a mixture of fragments contributed by several dominant community members. This product is electrophoresed in a polyacrylamide gel, and the DNA is visualized following staining. The result is a complex banding pattern that provides a community-specific profile, with each DNA band corresponding to a bacterial population on the original assemblage.
