= List of endophytes =

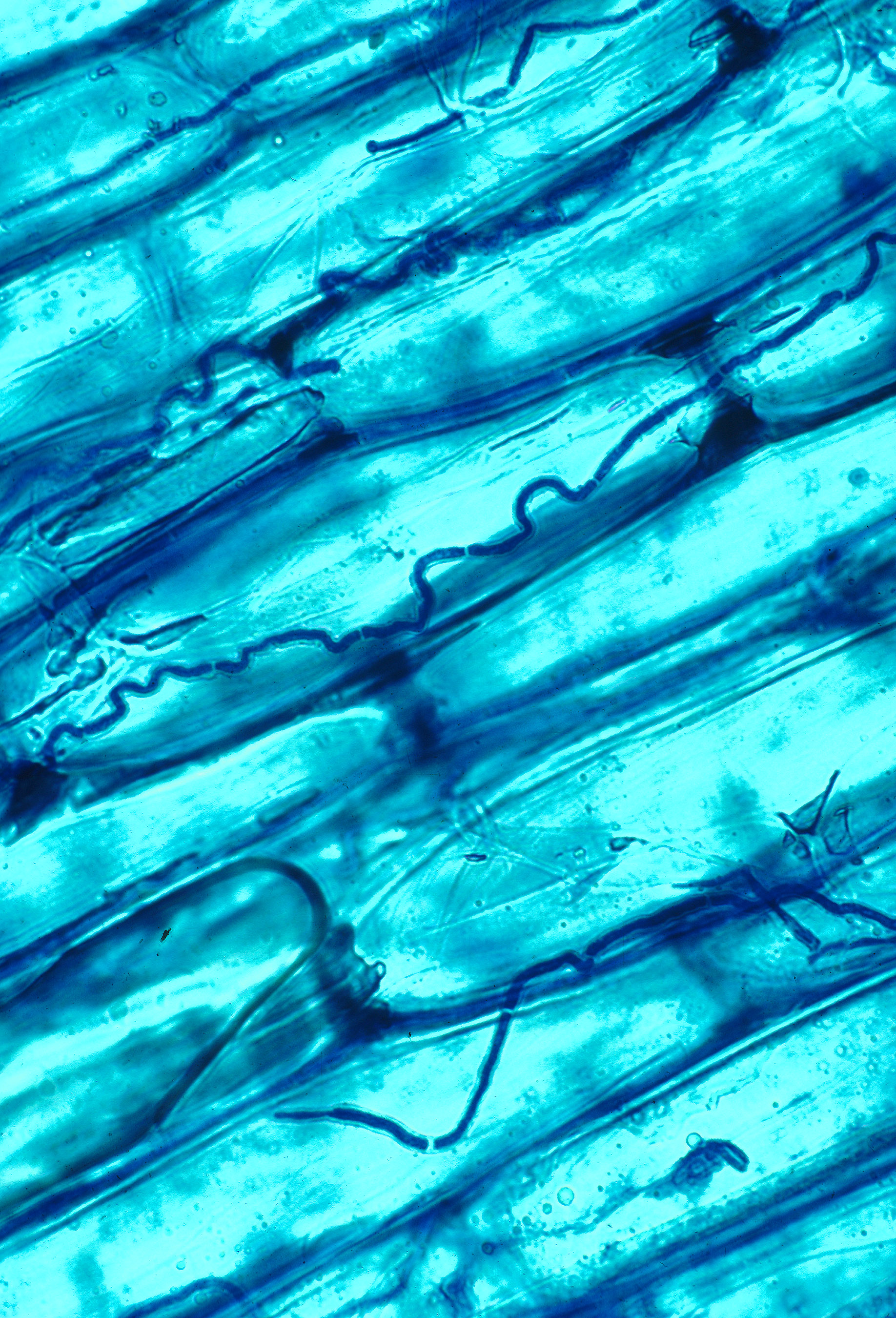
Neotyphodium coenophialum in leaves of tall fescue

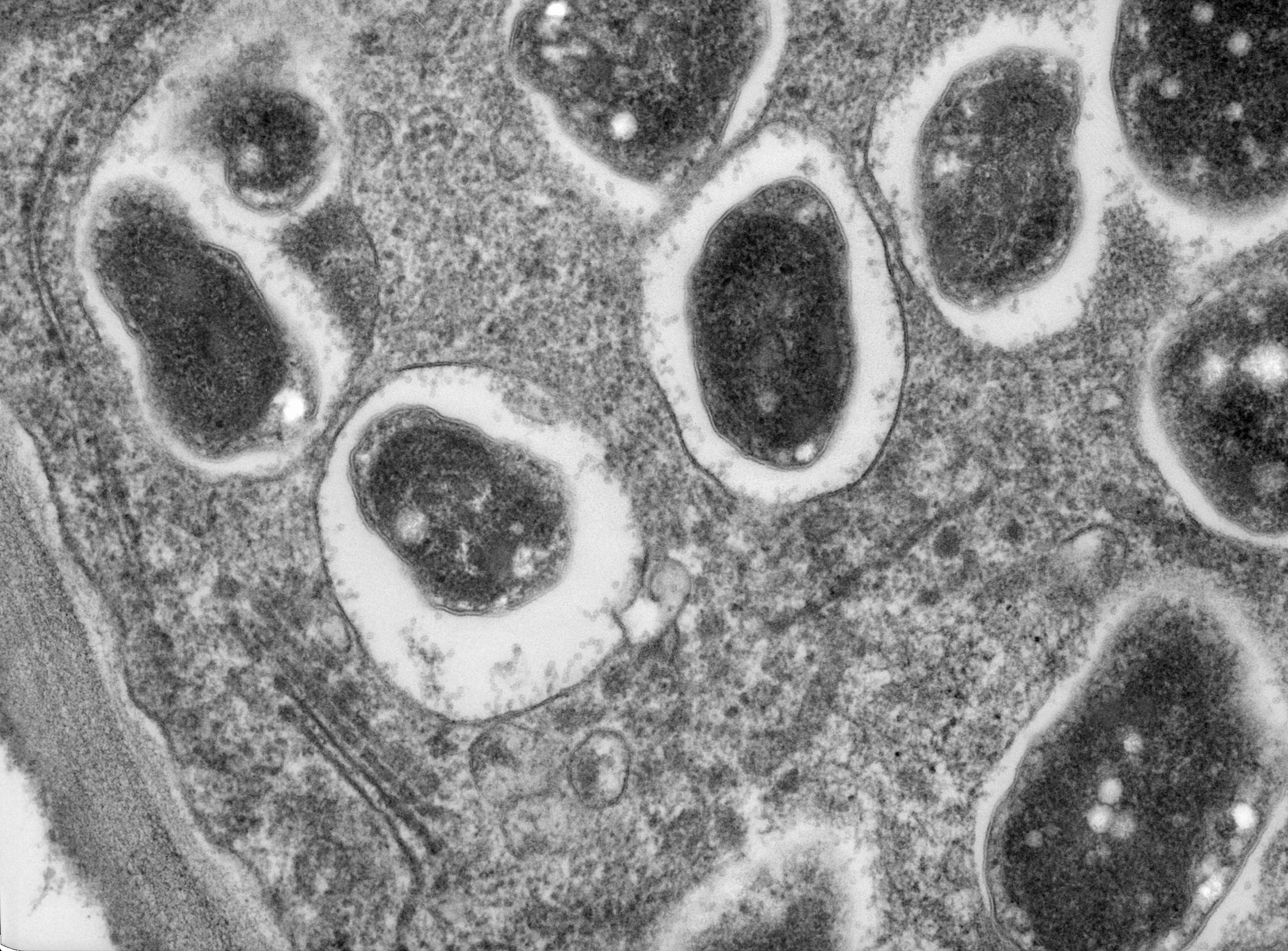
Bradyrhizobium japonicum in root nodules of soybean

Endophytes are microorganisms, primarily fungi and bacteria, that live within the tissues of plants without causing apparent disease symptoms for at least part of their life cycle. Some of them are mutualistic symbionts with beneficial effects on their host, such as improved growth or resistance against disease or environmental stress, and are being used as microbial inoculants. However, pathogens and saprophytes may also be endophytic at some point of their life cycle. Endophytes are distinct from mycorrhizal fungi or rhizosphere microbes in that they live entirely within the plant. Most endophytes known are bacteria or fungi, although there are also some endophytic algae and oomycetes.

This list contains genera with endophytic species (but which may also have non-endophytic species). Species are only listed in notable cases. Where specific variants or cultivars of a species are endophytic, this is detailed on the taxon's page. The host range is "wide" when it does not include only a specific lineage of plants; in that case, the lineage is given.

== Bacteria ==
See also Rhizobia for the nitrogen-fixing bacteria on roots of legumes (Fabaceae).

| Genus/species | Phylum | Class | Order | Host range | Roots/shoots colonized? |
|---|---|---|---|---|---|
| Acidovorax facilis | Proteobacteria | Betaproteobacteria | Burkholderiales | ? | ? |
| Bradyrhizobium | Proteobacteria | Alphaproteobacteria | Rhizobiales | legumes | roots |
| Rhizobium | Proteobacteria | Alphaproteobacteria | Rhizobiales | legumes | roots |
| Rhodococcus rhodochrous | Actinobacteria | Actinobacteria | Actinomycetales | ? | ? |
| Rhodococcus rhodochrous | Actinobacteria | Actinobacteria | Actinomycetales | ? | ? |

== Fungi ==
| Genus/species | Phylum | Class | Order | Host range | Roots/shoots colonized? |
|---|---|---|---|---|---|
| Colletotrichum | Ascomycota | Sordariomycetes | Glomerellales | wide | shoots & roots |
| Curvularia | Ascomycota | Dothideomycetes | Pleosporales | wide | shoots & roots |
| Epichloë | Ascomycota | Sordariomycetes | Hypocreales | grasses | shoots |
| Fusarium | Ascomycota | Sordariomycetes | Hypocreales | wide | shoots & roots |
| Mycosphaerella | Ascomycota | Dothideomycetes | Capnodiales | ? | ? |
| Neotyphodium | Ascomycota | Sordariomycetes | Hypocreales | grasses | shoots |
| Piriformospora | Basidiomycota | Agaricomycetes | Sebacinales | wide | roots |
| Cladosporium | Ascomycota | Dothideomycetes | Capnodiales | wide | |
| Serendipita | Basidiomycota | Agaricomycetes | Sebacinales | wide | roots |

== Algae and oomycetes ==
| Genus/species | Phylum | Class | Order | Host range | Roots/shoots colonized? |
|---|---|---|---|---|---|
| Pythium oligandrum | Heterokontophyta, | Oomycota | Pythiales | wide | roots |

== See also ==
- List of symbiotic organisms
- List of symbiotic relationships
- Plant pathology
- Plant use of endophytic fungi in defense
