= Sebacina schweinitzii =

Scientific classification
- Kingdom: Fungi
- Division: Basidiomycota
- Class: Agaricomycetes
- Order: Sebacinales
- Family: Sebacinaceae
- Genus: Sebacina
- Species: S. schweinitzii

Binomial name
- Sebacina schweinitzii (Peck) Oberw.

Synonyms
- Thelephora schweinitzii Peck; Tremellodendron schweinitzii (Peck) G.F. Atk.; Sebacina pallida Oberw., Garnica & K. Riess; Thelephora pallida Schwein. DC; Tremellodendron pallidum Burt

Species of fungi

Sebacina schweinitzii spores at a magnification of approximately 1000x. From Bodman in The American Midland Naturalist. 1942

Sebacina schweinitzii, more commonly known as the jellied false coral fungus or false coral fungus, is a basidiomycete mushroom in the genus Sebacina. The earliest name given with the species is Thelephora pallida, published by Lewis David de Schweinitz in 1832, but that name is illegitimate. This fungus was officially described by American mycologist Charles Horton Peck in 1878 as Thelephora schweinitzii, but since then has been renamed multiple times and changed genera. It is named after Schweinitz, who is widely considered the "father of North American mycology."

== Taxonomy ==
Sebacina schweinitzii has been known by many names. The oldest is Thelephora pallida, which was published by Lewis David de Schweinitz in the Transactions of the American Philosophical Society (dated 1832, printed 1834), in Bethlehem, Pennsylvania "on the ground in forest". In 1878, Charles Horton Peck published Thelephora schweinitzii in the annual report of the New York State Museum (dated 1876).

In 1902, George Francis Atkinson transferred the species to the genus Tremellodendron, creating the combination Tremellodendron schweinitzii. The name was then changed again in 1915 by Edward Angus Burt to Tremellodendron pallidum, as he attempted to change the species name back to honour Schweinitz. This name was deemed illegitimate by botanical law due to another species already having the name pallidum. Both names for the species remained in use, however, and T. pallidum persisted for many years, continuing to appear in ecological studies and field guides of ectomycorrhizal fungi.

As DNA sequencing became more common in mycology, scientists Franz Oberwinkler and colleagues merged the genus Tremellodendron into the genus Sebacina to make Sebacina a monophyletic group. In their 2014 paper they renamed this fungus Sebacina pallida. In 2017 this name was also found to be illegitimate because its basionym, Thelephora pallida from Schwein., is a later homonym of Thelephora pallida, an entirely different species named in 1800. This led to the fungus gaining its current name, with Roland Kirschner, Oberwinkler and Tina Hofmann honoring Peck's renaming, Sebacina schweinitzii.

== Phylogeny ==
In a 2014 study of ribosomal DNA by Oberwinkler and colleagues, S. schweinitzii (then Tremellodendron schweinitzii) fell in a strongly supported clade with six other Sebacina collections. The traditional genus Tremellodendron, which included roughly 8–15 species, was not a single evolutionary lineage. Its species instead fell into three separate Sebacina clades, including the type species T. candidum in one and T. schweinitzii in another. This is why these same authors changed the scientific nomenclature of the species as discussed in the Taxonomy section above. The authors concluded that the upright, coralloid basidiocarp evolved several different times in Sebacina. The clade containing Sebacina schweinitzii includes both crust-like and coral-like fungi, so overall fungal body shape is a poor guide to identification.

The species boundaries in this group of fungi are still partially unsettled, as a 2004 study found that collections labeled with both T. schweinitzii and T. pallidum were genetically distinct, suggesting a possible cryptic species. DNA sequencing from the historic "type" specimens would be needed to help resolve this issue.

== Morphology ==
The fruiting bodies of Sebacina schweinitzii are tough and fleshy and grow in clusters on the ground. Bodman described them as erect, up to about 10 cm (3.9 in) tall and 6 cm (2.4 in) wide, with the tips coming together to form a single fused base. It has flattened, jagged, anastomosing branches coming off of the body, with toothlike ends. Coral like shape which forms "rosette-like structures when well developed." The body is leathery and dry, not gelatinous. It generally starts as a white or yellow color and can become green with age due to algae. As this fungus ages and dries the branches may also become yellowish or brown.

This fungus may look like a coral fungus such as Clavaria and is commonly confused with true coral fungi, as its growth habit mimics them closely. Sebacina Schweinitzii is not a coral, however, and has the internal structure of a jelly fungus, which is why it is called a "false coral." It is placed in this group because of its spore producing basidia. The basidia are cruciate-septate, and "pear shaped when young" as described by Bodman. These basidia are divided into four cells by cross-shaped walls. The center of the fungus body is made of parallel strands of unbranched hyphae that go the entire length of the basidiocarp. The hyphae of the subhymenium branch freely. No clamp connections are visible. The basidiospores can germinate by producing secondary spores.

The spore print is white. The spores utilize ballistospores for areal dispersal. The spores are 7-12 x 4-6 µ; allantoid; hyaline in KOH; smooth.

== Ecology ==
Sebacina schweinitzii is an ectomycorrhizal fungus, which forms mutually beneficial relationships with the roots of hardwood trees such as oak trees. This fungus grows on the ground, on moss, or on pieces of wood in hardwood forests. It can start its slow development in the spring but it tends to grow in the wetter, warmer seasons of summer and fall.

Ectomycorrhizal status was first shown for Sebacinaceae in 2002 and molecular evidence was gained in 2004. Additionally, ectomycorrhizal Sebacinaceae are difficult to grow in pure culture, possibly because they depend on their host trees for carbon.

This species has a large range across the United States East coast with specimens being found as far North as Canada and Maine, as far south as Florida, and as far West as New Mexico. It can also be found in Europe and South America.

== Biology and relevance to humans ==
Although Sebacina schweinitzii is not toxic to humans, it is generally considered inedible due to its stringy or leathery texture and chewiness, as well as its unpleasant flavor. This should also not be consumed due to its close resemblance to many coral mushrooms, some of which can be toxic or cause nausea and other health issues.

Ectomycorrhizal Sebacinaceae are among the most species-rich and abundant ectomycorrhizal fungal groups in temperate and tropical forests, and dominate on ectomycorrhizal plants in Arctic and alpine regions as well. More genome sequencing and research needs to be done on Sebacina to fully understand their ectomycorrhizal connections and how these fungi function in a forest ecosystem.
