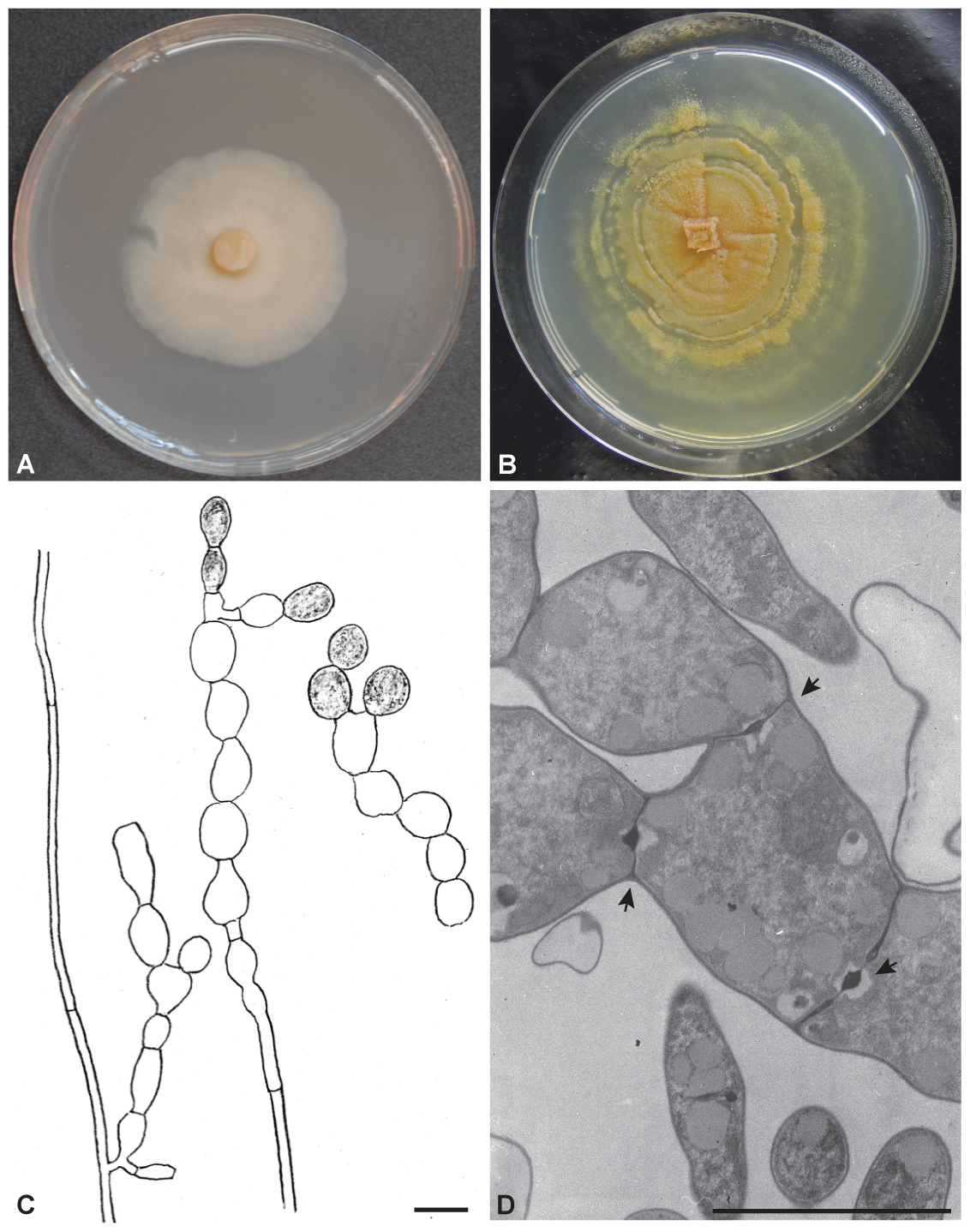
- Morphology of Serendipita herbamans: (A) Colony after two weeks of inoculation on MYP agar. (B) Colony after 6 months of inoculation on MYP agar. (C) Cylindrical and monilioid hyphae without clamps. Older monilioid hyphae become slightly yellow coloured. (D) Transmission electron micrographs showing monilioid hyphae with a septal porus at the constrictions (arrows). Scale bar C, D = 5 µm.

Scientific classification
- Kingdom: Fungi
- Division: Basidiomycota
- Class: Agaricomycetes
- Order: Sebacinales
- Family: Serendipitaceae
- Genus: Serendipita; P.Roberts (1993)

Type species
- Serendipita vermifera (Oberw.) P.Roberts (1993)

Species
- S. australiana S. communis S. evanescens S. herbamans S. inclusa S. indica S. interna S. invisibilis S. lyrica S. occidentalis S. orliensis S. rarihospitum S. restingae S. sacchari S. secunda S. sigmaspora S. talbotii S. vermifera S. warcupii S. whamiae S. williamsii

Synonyms
- Piriformospora

= Serendipita =

Genus of fungi

Serendipita is a genus in the family Serendipitaceae. The type species, Serendipita vermifera, was first described by Oberwinkler in 1964 (originally Sebacina vermifera). There is a large molecular diversity, but the absence of macroscopic fruiting bodies and limited number of micromorphological traits limit the characterization of species within this genus. Depending on the species they are considered either endophytic or obligate parasites.

== Taxonomy ==
The genus name Serendipita was first designated in 1993. In 2016, this genus was moved into its own family, Serendipitaceae, based on molecular phylogeny.

Notable species:

- Serendipita vermifera: commonly found in or near corticoid fungi in decaying wood. Historically, they are considered intrahymenial fungi or obligate parasites. However, evidence suggests that they are able to live freely on surfaces of rotting wood.
- Serendipita indica (formerly Piriformospora indica): an endophytic root-colonizing species. Their potential ability to promote plant growth and resistance to pathogens makes them an interesting option for agricultural biostimulation.

== Description ==
Serendipita produce thin, sparsely branched hyphae that are either clamped or unclamped. Their basidia are formed in single or small clusters, commonly from one sub-basidial cell. Young basidia are globose or ovoid and become ellipsoid when they mature. They contain 1-4 tubular sterigmata per basidium. They lack hyphidia and do not have a macroscopic fruiting body. Their spores are often elongated.
