= Tremelloscypha =

Scientific classification
- Kingdom: Fungi
- Division: Basidiomycota
- Class: Agaricomycetes
- Order: Sebacinales
- Family: Sebacinaceae
- Genus: Tremelloscypha; Reid (1979)

Type species
- Tremelloscypha australiensis Reid (1979)

Species
- Tremelloscypha australiensis Tremelloscypha gelatinosa Tremelloscypha dichroa Tremelloscypha amesii

Genus of fungi

Tremelloscypha is a genus of fungi in the family Sebacinaceae. The genus was first established by Derek Reid in 1979 when he described the first species Tremelloscypha australiensis.

== Description ==
They commonly produce conspicuous basidiocarps, typically with the hymenium or subhymenium with basidia being located on the lower part of the fruiting bodies. The texture of their hyphae is dry and loose.

== Ecology ==
Tremelloscypha are mycorrhizal symbionts and they mark the transition from saprobic to mycorrhizal nutritional modes in Sebacinales, with the latter likely persisting in all subsequent evolved taxa.
