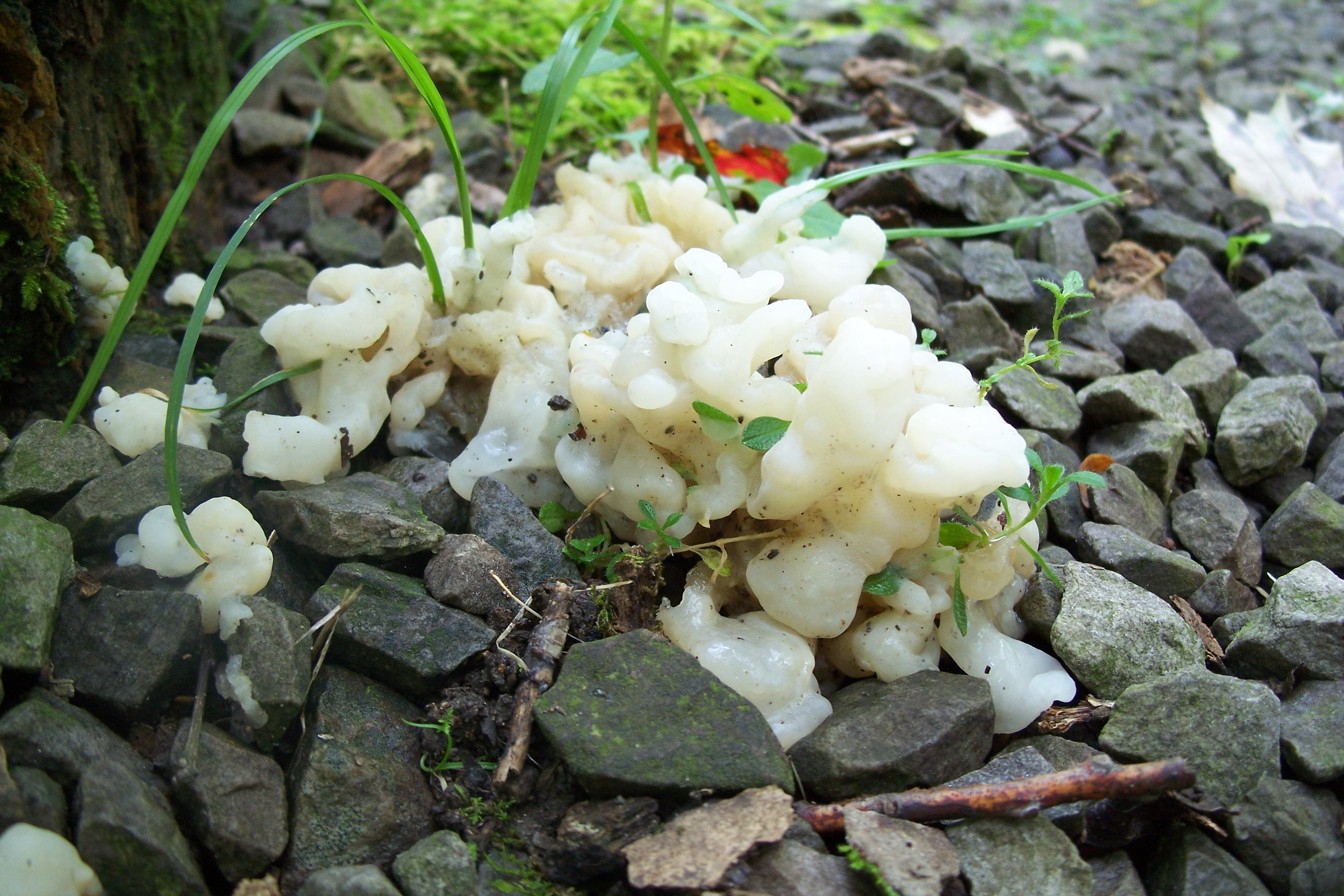
- Sebacina sparassoidea, West Virginia

Scientific classification
- Kingdom: Fungi
- Division: Basidiomycota
- Class: Agaricomycetes
- Order: Sebacinales
- Family: Sebacinaceae
- Genus: Sebacina
- Species: S. sparassoidea

Binomial name
- Sebacina sparassoidea (Lloyd) P. Roberts (2003)

Synonyms
- Tremella sparassoidea Lloyd (1921); Corticium tremellinum var. reticulatum Berk. (1873); Tremella reticulata (Berk.) Farl. (1908)

= Sebacina sparassoidea =

Sebacina sparassoidea
- Mycological characteristics
- Smooth hymenium
- No distinct cap
- Hymenium attachment is irregular or not applicable
- Lacks a stipe
- Spore print is white
- Ecology is mycorrhizal
- Edibility is unknown

Sebacina sparassoidea, the white coral jelly fungus, is a species of fungus in the family Sebacinaceae. Its coral-like basidiocarps (fruit bodies) are typically a yellowish off-white and have a gelatinous and elastic texture. Found in eastern North America, in humid environments amongst rotting logs of deciduous trees, particularly oaks, it is often observed growing throughout the months of August to September.

== Taxonomy ==
The white coral jelly fungus was first described in 1873 by British mycologist Miles Joseph Berkeley as a variety, var. reticulatum, of Corticium tremellinum. In 1908 it was raised to species level and placed in the genus Tremella, as Tremella reticulata, by American mycologist William Gilson Farlow. In 2003 British mycologist Peter Roberts re-examined the species and transferred it to the genus Sebacina. Since a different species (Sebacina reticulata Pat.) already existed with the species epithet reticulata, the new combination in Sebacina was applied to the earliest available synonym, as Sebacina sparassoidea.

== Description ==
Fruit bodies of the white coral jelly fungus are composed of multiple, erect, coalescing, hollow lobes or branches arising from a central point. Such structures are roughly 3 to 20 cm in diameter and 3 to 12 cm tall. The associated spore print is white. Microscopically, the hyphae lack clamp connections. Basidia are septate. Basidiospores are ellipsoid, 9–13 × 6–7 μm.

== Edibility ==
Sources disagree about edibility. However it is never considered dangerous, nor is it of exceptional culinary use.
