= Streptomyces tritolerans =

Scientific classification
- Domain: Bacteria
- Kingdom: Bacillati
- Phylum: Actinomycetota
- Class: Actinomycetes
- Order: Streptomycetales
- Family: Streptomycetaceae
- Genus: Streptomyces
- Species: S. tritolerans

Binomial name
- Streptomyces tritolerans Dastager et al. 2009

Type strain
- CCTCC AA 206013, DAS 165, DSM 41899

Species of bacterium

Streptomyces tritolerans is a bacterium species from the genus of Streptomyces which has been isolated from soil in Karnataka in India. The species was subsequently described as being both a plant endophyte and resident in the guts of earthworms and silkworms. S. tritolerans is one of several Actinobacteria which has been shown to promote plant growth under high stress conditions.

== See also ==
- List of Streptomyces species
