= Aspergillus endophyticus =

Scientific classification
- Kingdom: Fungi
- Division: Ascomycota
- Class: Eurotiomycetes
- Order: Eurotiales
- Family: Aspergillaceae
- Genus: Aspergillus
- Species: A. endophyticus

Binomial name
- Aspergillus endophyticus V. Hubka, A.J. Chen & R.A. Samson (2017)

Species of fungus

Aspergillus endophyticus is a species of fungus in the genus Aspergillus, section Aspergillus. It was isolated as an endophyte of Acer pseudoplatanus in the Czech Republic.

The identified extrolites produced by A. endophyticus include auroglaucin, bisanthrons, dihydroauroglaucin, echinulins, emodin, erythroglaucin, flavoglaucin, isoechinulins, neoechinulins, physcion, and tetrahydroauroglaucin.

== Growth and morphology ==
A. endophyticus has been cultivated on both yeast extract sucrose agar (YES) plates and Malt Extract Agar Oxoid® (MEAOX) plates. The growth morphology of the colonies can be seen in the pictures below.

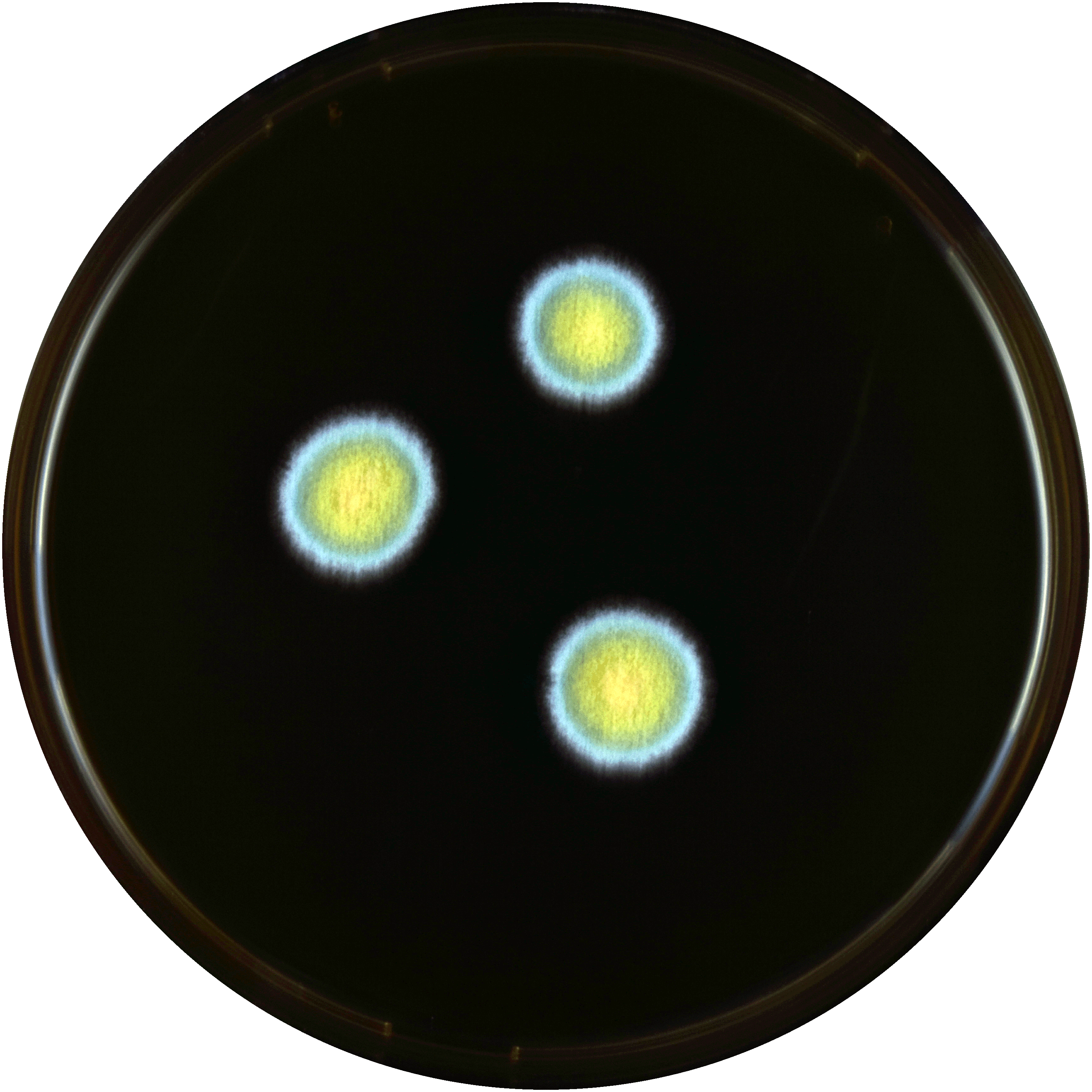
Aspergillus endophyticus growing on MEAOX plate

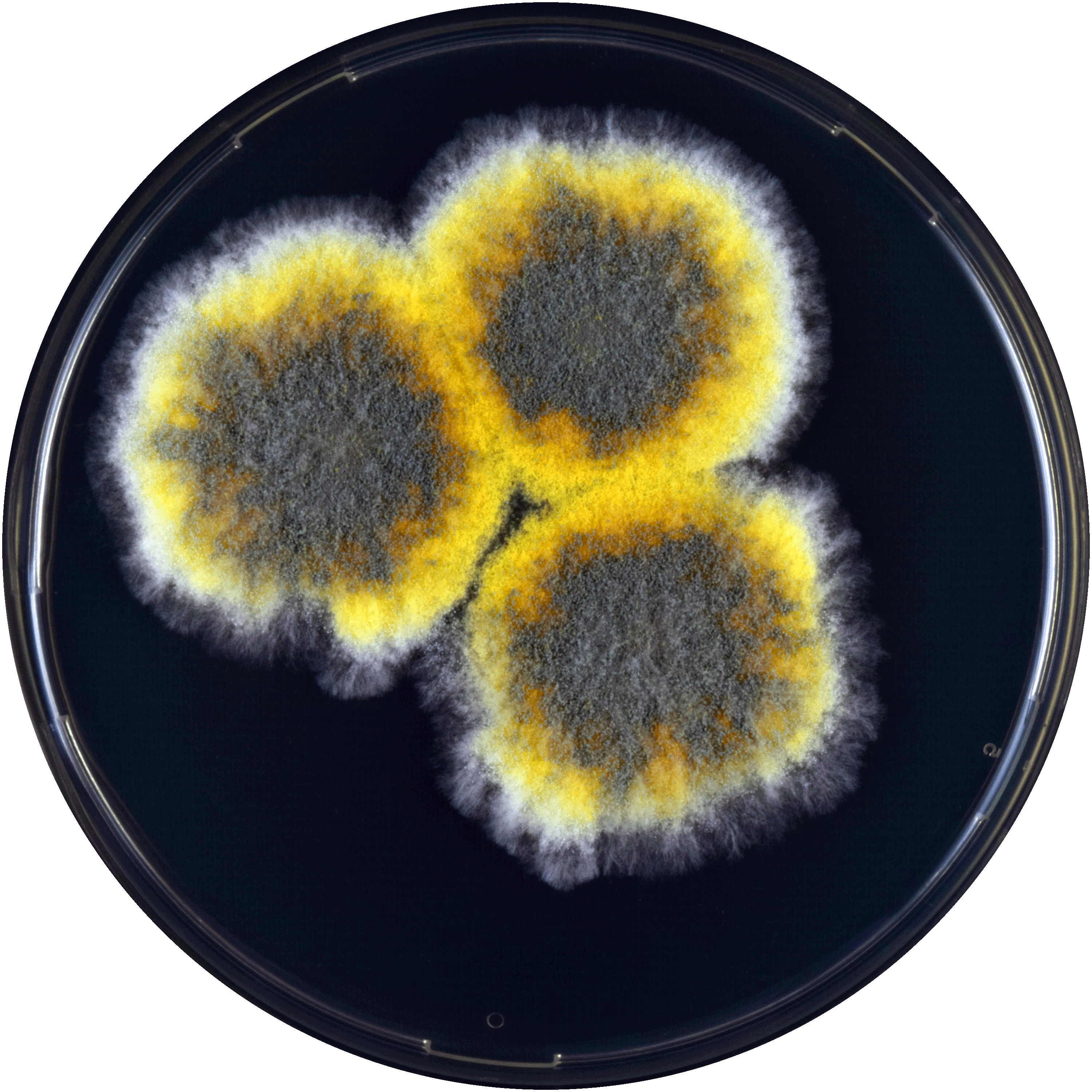
Aspergillus endophyticus growing on YES plate
