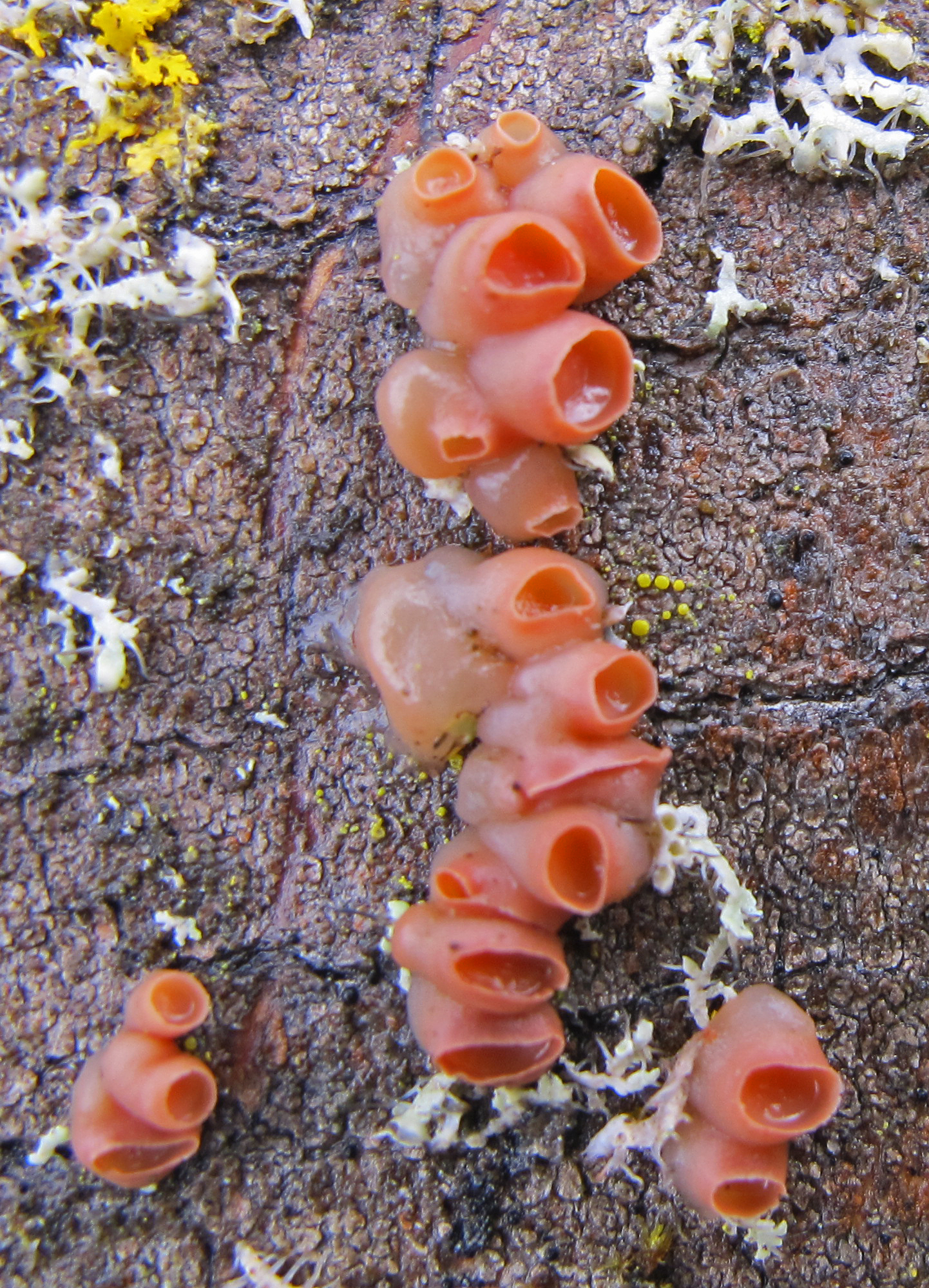
- Ditangium cerasi

Scientific classification
- Domain: Eukaryota
- Kingdom: Fungi
- Division: Basidiomycota
- Class: Agaricomycetes
- Order: Sebacinales
- Family: Sebacinaceae
- Genus: Ditangium; P. Karst. (1870)

Type species
- Ditangium insigne P. Karst. (1870)

Species
- Ditangium altaicum Ditangium cerasi Ditangium incarnatum

Synonyms
- Craterocolla

= Ditangium =

Genus of fungi

Ditangium is a genus of fungi in the family Sebacinaceae. Species form gelatinous basidiocarps (fruitbodies) on wood, often with similarly gelatinous anamorphs (asexual states). Species appear to be saprobic and occupy deciduous and coniferous trees at an early decomposition stage.

== Taxonomy ==
Historically, the name Digantium referred to the anamorphic state and Craterocolla to the teleomorphic state. Following changes to the International Code of Nomenclature for algae, fungi, and plants, the practice of giving different names to teleomorph and anamorph forms of the same fungus was discontinued, meaning that Craterocolla became a synonym of the earlier name Ditangium.
