= Plant use of endophytic fungi in defense =

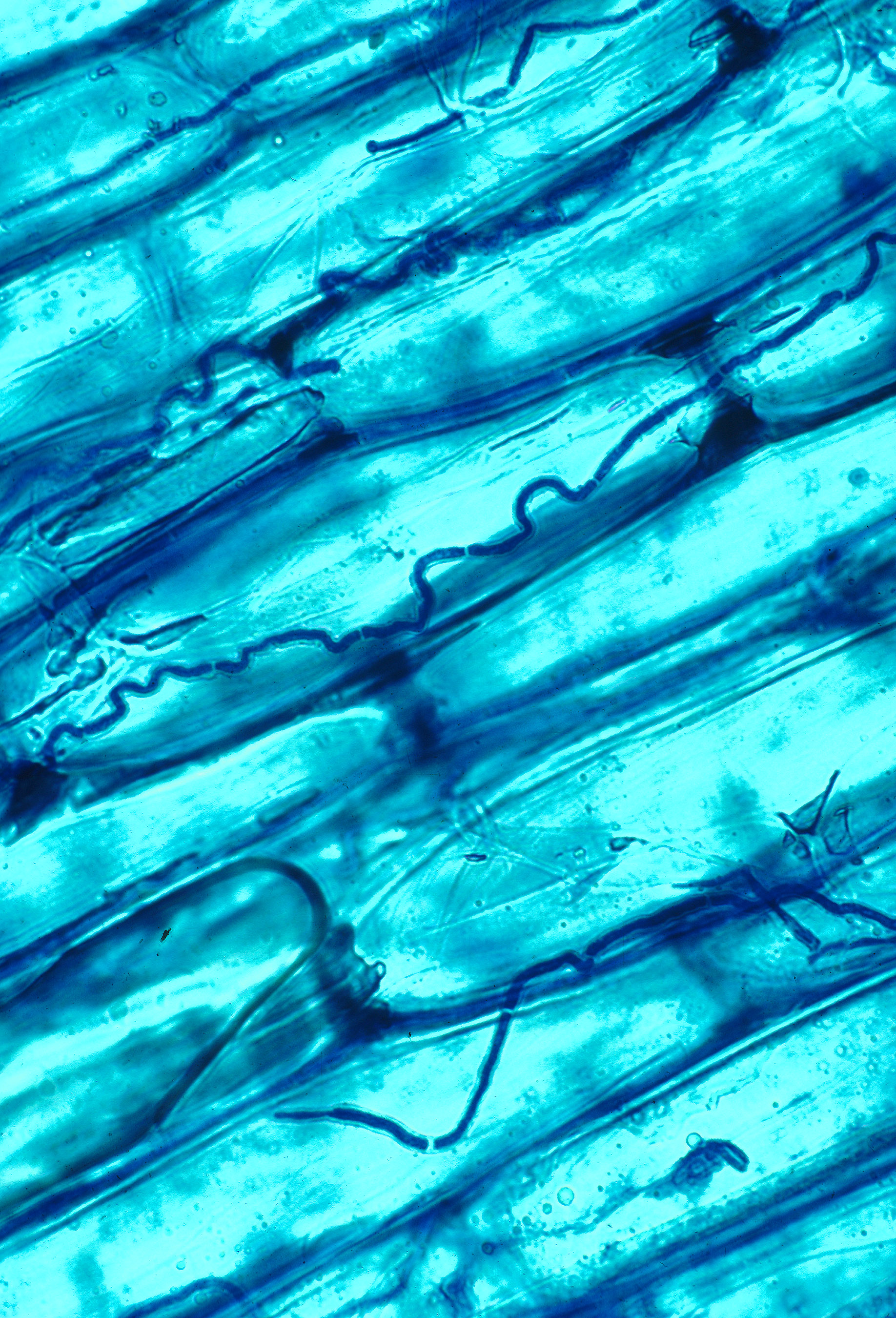
Neotyphodium spp. are commonly associated with tall fescue in the leaf sheath tissue. They produce secondary metabolites toxic to herbivores.

Plant use of endophytic fungi in defense occurs when endophytic fungi, which live symbiotically with the majority of plants by entering their cells, are utilized as an indirect defense against herbivores. In exchange for carbohydrate energy resources, the fungus provides benefits to the plant which can include increased water or nutrient uptake and protection from phytophagous insects, birds or mammals. Once associated, the fungi alter nutrient content of the plant and enhance or begin production of secondary metabolites. The change in chemical composition acts to deter herbivory by insects, grazing by ungulates and/or oviposition by adult insects. Endophyte-mediated defense can also be effective against pathogens and non-herbivory damage.

This differs from other forms of indirect defense in that the fungi live within the plant cells and directly alter their physiology. In contrast, other biotic defenses such as predators or parasites of the herbivores consuming a plant are normally attracted by volatile organic compounds (known as semiochemicals) released following damage or by food rewards and shelter produced by the plant. These defenders vary in the time spent with the plant: from long enough to oviposit to remaining there for numerous generations, as in the ant-acacia mutualism. Endophytic fungi tend to live with the plant over its entire life. The endophytic fungi grow in the intercellular spaces of the plants, parallel to the leaves and stems, as elongated and thinly-dispersed branched hyphae. The fungal hyphae penetrates the host plant's embryo and grows along the seeds to infect the new plants that will grow from the seeds, which is a process of transmission that is known as vertical transmission.

== Diversity of endophytic associations ==
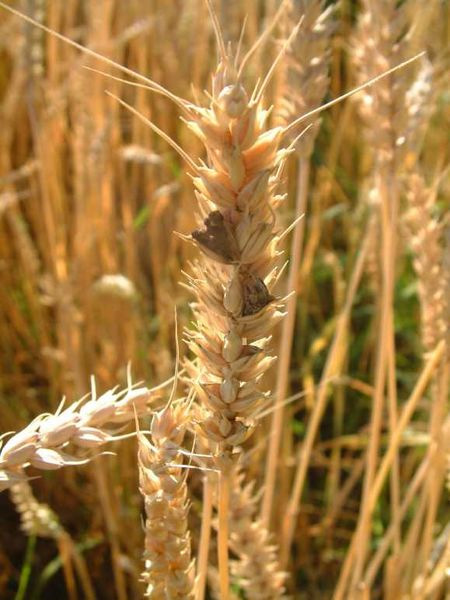
Claviceps spp. fungus growing on wheat spikes, a common endophyte of the grasses.

The fungal endophytes are a diverse group of organisms forming associations almost ubiquitously throughout the plant kingdom. The endophytes which provide indirect defense against herbivores may have come from a number of origins, including mutualistic root endophyte associations and the evolution of entomopathogenic fungi into plant-associated endophytes. The endomycorrhiza, which live in plant roots, are made up of five groups: arbuscular, arbutoid, ericoid, monotropoid, and orchid mycorrhizae. The majority of species are from the phylum Glomeromycota with the ericoid species coming from the Ascomycota, while the arbutoid, monotropoid and orchid mycorrhizae are classified as Basidiomycota. The entomopathogenic view has gained support from observations of increased fungal growth in response to induced plant defenses and colonization of plant tissues.

Examples of host specialists are numerous – especially in temperate environments – with multiple specialist fungi frequently infecting one plant individual simultaneously. These specialists demonstrate high levels of specificity for their host species and may form physiologically adapted host-races on closely related congeners. Piriformospora indica is an interesting endophytic fungus of the order Sebacinales, the fungus is capable of colonising roots and forming symbiotic relationship with every possible plant on earth. P. indica has also been shown to increase both crop yield and plant defence of a variety of crops(barley, tomato, maize etc.) against root-pathogens. However, there are also many examples of generalist fungi which may occur on different hosts at different frequencies (e.g. Acremonium endophytes from five subgenera of Festuca) and as part of a variety of fungal assemblages. They may even spread to novel, introduced plant species. Endophytic mutualists associate with species representative of every growth form and life history strategy in the grasses and many other groups of plants. The effects of associating with multiple strains or species of fungus at once can vary, but in general, one type of fungus will be providing the majority of benefit to the plant.

== Mechanisms of defense ==
=== Secondary metabolite production ===
Some chemical defenses once thought to be produced by the plant have since been shown to be synthesized by endophytic fungi. The chemical basis of insect resistance in endophyte-plant defense mutualisms has been most extensively studied in the perennial ryegrass and three major classes of secondary metabolites are found: indole diterpenes, ergot alkaloids and peramine. Related compounds are found across the range of endophytic fungal associations with plants. The terpenes and alkaloids are inducible defenses which act similarly to defensive compounds produced by plants and are highly toxic to a wide variety of phytophagous insects as well as mammalian herbivores. Peramine occurs widely in endophyte-associated grasses and may also act as a signal to invertebrate herbivores of the presence of more dangerous defensive chemicals. Terpenoids and ketones have been linked to protection from specialist and generalist herbivores (both insect and vertebrate) across the higher plants.

Generalist herbivores are more likely than specialists to be negatively affected by the defense chemicals that endophytes produce because they have, on average, less resistance to these specific, qualitative defenses. Among the chewing insects, infection by mycorrhizae can actually benefit specialist feeders even if it negatively affects generalists. The overall pattern of effects on insect herbivores seems to support this, with generalist mesophyll feeders experiencing negative effects of host infection, although phloem feeders appear to be affected little by fungal defenses.

Secondary metabolites may also affect the behaviour of natural enemies of herbivorous species in a multi-trophic defense/predation association. For instance, terpenoid production attracts natural enemies of herbivores to damaged plants. These enemies can reduce numbers of invertebrate herbivores substantially and may not be attracted in the absence of endophytic symbionts. Multi-trophic interactions can have cascading consequences for the entire plant community, with the potential to vary widely depending on the combination of fungal species infecting a given plant and the abiotic conditions.

=== Altered nutrient content ===
Due to the inherently nutrient-exchange based economy of the plant-endophyte association, it is not surprising that infection by fungi directly alters the chemical composition of plants, with corresponding impacts on their herbivores. Endophytes frequently increase apoplastic carbohydrate concentration, altering the C:N ratio of leaves and making them a less efficient source of protein. This effect can be compounded when the fungus also uses plant nitrogen to form N-based secondary metabolites such as alkaloids. For example, the thistle gall fly (Urophora cardui) experiences reduced performance on plants infected with endophytic fungi due to the decrease in N-content and ability to produce large quantities of high-quality gall tissue. Additionally, increased availability of limiting nutrients to plants improves overall performance and health, potentially increasing the ability of infected plants to defend themselves.

== Impacts on host plants ==
=== Herbivory prevention ===
Studies of fungal infection consistently reveal that plants with endophytes are less likely to suffer substantial damage, and herbivores feeding on infected plants are less productive. There are multiple modes through which endophytic fungi reduce insect herbivore damage, including avoidance (deterrence), reduced feeding, reduced development rate, reduced growth and/or population growth, reduced survival, and reduced oviposition. Vertebrate herbivores such as birds, rabbits and deer show the same patterns of avoidance and reduced performance. Even below-ground herbivores such as nematodes and root-feeding insects are reduced by endophyte infection. The strongest evidence for anti-herbivore benefits of fungal endophytes come from studies of herbivore populations being extirpated when allowed to feed only on infected plants. Examples of local extinction have been documented in crickets, larval armyworms and flour beetles.

Yet chemical defenses produced by fungal endophytes are not universally effective, and numerous insect herbivores are unaffected by a given compound at one or more life history stages; larval stages are often more susceptible to toxins than adults. Even endophytes which purportedly provide some defense benefit to their hosts such as the Neotyphidium partner of many grass species in the alpine tundra do not always lead to avoidance or ill-effects on herbivores due to spatial variation in levels of consumption.

=== Mutualism-pathogenicity continuum ===
Not all endophytic symbioses confer protection from herbivores – only some species associations act as defense mutualisms. The difference between a mutualistic endophyte and a pathogenic one can be indistinct and dependent on interactions with other species or environmental conditions. Some endophytic fungi can counteract the negative impacts of pathogenic fungi in some plants such as Siberian ryegrass (Elymus sibiricus) by increasing seed germination, coleoptile and radicle length, and seedling weight. Some fungi which are pathogens in the absence of herbivores may become beneficial under high levels of insect damage, such as species which kill plant cells in order to make nutrients available for their own growth, thereby altering nutritional content of leaves and making them a less desirable foodstuff. Some endomycorrhizae may provide defense benefits but at the cost of lost reproductive potential by rendering grasses partially sterile with their own fungal reproductive structures taking precedence. This is not unusual among fungi, as non-endophytic plant pathogens have similar conditionally beneficial effects on defense. Some species of endophyte may be beneficial for the plants in other ways (e.g. nutrient and water uptake) but will provide less benefit as a plant receives more damage and not produce defensive chemicals in response. The effect of one fungus on the plant can be altered when multiple strains of fungi are infecting a given individual in combination.

Some endomycorrhizae may actually promote herbivore damage by making plants more susceptible to it. For example, some oak fungal endophytes are positively correlated with the levels of damage from leaf miners (Cameraria spp.), although negatively correlated with number of larvae present due to a reduction of oviposition on infected plants, which partially mitigates the higher damage rate. This continuum between mutualism and pathogenicity of endophytic fungi has major implications for plant fitness depending on the species of partners available in a given environment; mutualist status is conditional in a way similar to pollination and can shift from one to the other just as frequently.

=== Fitness and competitive ability ===
Fungal endophytes which provide defensive services to their host plants may exert selective pressures favouring association through enhanced fitness relative to uninfected hosts. The fungus Neotyphodium spp. infects grasses and increases fitness under conditions with high levels of interspecific competition. It does this through a combination of benefits including anti-herbivore defenses and growth promoting factors. The customary assumption that plant growth promotion is the main way fungal mutualists improve fitness under attack from herbivores is changing; alteration of plant chemical composition and induced resistance are now recognized as factors of great importance in improving competitive ability and fecundity. Plants undefended by chemical or physical means at certain points in their life histories have higher survival rates when infected with beneficial endophytic fungi. The general trend of plants infected with mutualistic fungi outperforming uninfected plants under moderate to high herbivory exerts selection for higher levels of fungal association as herbivory levels increase. Unsurprisingly, low to moderate levels of herbivore damage also increases the levels of infection by beneficial endophytic fungi.

In some cases the symbiosis between fungus and plant reaches a point of inseparability; fungal material is transmitted vertically from the maternal parent plant to seeds, forming a near-obligate mutualism. Having a mutualistic relationship with endophytic fungi can promote seed production and seed germination rates in some plant species, such as perennial ryegrass (Lolium perenne) and tall fescue (Festuca arundinacea). The fungi can also benefit the growth of the seedlings as it can enhance seedling growth rate, tiller number and height, and overall biomass. Because seeds are an important aspect of both fecundity and competitive ability for plants, high germination rates and seedling survival increase lifetime fitness. When fitness of plant and fungus become tightly intertwined, it is in the best interest of the endophyte to act in a manner beneficial to the plant, pushing it further toward the mutualism end of the continuum. Such effects of seed defense can also occur in dense stands of conspecifics through horizontal transmission of beneficial fungi. Mechanisms of microbial association defense, protecting the seeds rather than the already established plants, can have such drastic impacts on seed survival that they have been recognized to be an important aspect of the larger 'seed defence theory'.

=== Climate change ===
The range of associated plants and fungi may be altered as climate changes, and not necessarily in a synchronous fashion. Plants may lose or gain endophytes, with as yet unknown impacts on defense and fitness, although generalist species may provide indirect defense in new habitats more often than not. Above-ground and below-ground associations can be mutual drivers of diversity, so altering the interactions between plants and their fungi may also have drastic effects on the community at large, including herbivores. Changes in distribution may bring plants into competition with previously established local species, making the fungal community – and particularly the pathogenic role of fungus – important in determining outcomes of competition with non-native invasive species. As carbon dioxide levels rise, the amplified photosynthesis will increase the pool of carbohydrates available to endophytic partners, potentially altering the strength of associations. Infected C_{3} plants show greater relative growth rate under high CO_{2} conditions compared to uninfected plants, and it is possible that the fungi drive this pattern of increased carbohydrate production.

Levels of herbivory may also increase as temperature and carbon dioxide concentrations rise. However, should plants remain associated with their current symbiotic fungi, evidence suggests that the degree of defense afforded them should not be altered. Although the amount of damage caused by herbivores frequently increases under elevated levels of atmospheric CO_{2}, the proportion of damage remains constant when host plants are infected by their fungal endophytes. The change in carbon-nitrogen ratio will also have important consequences for herbivores. As carbohydrate levels increase within plants, relative nitrogen content will fall, having the dual effects of reducing nutritional benefit per unit biomass and also lowering concentrations of nitrogen-based defenses such as alkaloids.

== History of research ==
=== Early recognition ===
The effects of endophytic fungi on the chemical composition of plants have been known by humans for centuries in the form of poisoning and disease as well as medicinal uses. Especially noted were impacts on agricultural products and livestock. Recognition and study of the mutualism did not begin in earnest until the 1980s when early studies on the impacts of alkaloids on animal herbivory confirmed their importance as agents of deterrence. Biologists began to characterize the diversity of endophytic mutualists through primitive techniques such as isozyme analysis and measuring the effects of infection on herbivores. Basic descriptive accounts of these previously neglected species of fungus became a major goal for mycologists, and a lot of research focus shifted to associates of the grass family (Poaceae) in particular, because of the large number of species which represent economically important commodities to humans.

=== Recent advances and future directions ===
In addition to continuing descriptive studies of the effects of infection by defense mutualist endophytes, there has been a sharp increase in the number of studies which delve further into the ecology of plant-fungus associations and especially their multi-trophic impacts. The processes by which endophytic fungi alter plant physiology and volatile chemical levels are virtually unknown, and limited current results show a lack of consistency under differing environmental conditions, especially differing levels of herbivory. Studies comparing the relative impacts of mutualistic endophytes on inducible defenses and tolerance show a central function of infection in determining both responses to herbivore damage. On the whole, molecular mechanisms behind endophyte-mediated plant defense has been an increasing focus of research over the past ten years.

Since the beginning of the biotechnology revolution, much research has been also focused on using genetically modified endophytes to improve plant yields and defensive properties. The genetic basis of response to herbivory is being explored in tall fescue, where it appears the production of jasmonic acid may play a role in downregulation of the host plant's chemical defense pathways when a fungal endophyte is present. In some cases, fungi that are closely associated with their hosts have transferred genes for secondary metabolite production to the host genome, which could help to explain multiple origins of chemical defenses within the phylogeny of various groups of plants. This represents an important line of inquiry to pursue, especially in regards to understanding the chemical pathways that can be utilized in biotechnological applications.

== Importance to humans ==
=== Agriculture and livestock ===
The secondary chemicals produced by endophytic fungi when associated with their host plants can be very harmful to mammals including livestock and humans, causing more than 600 million dollars in losses due to dead livestock every year. For example, the ergot alkaloids produced by Claviceps spp. have been dangerous contaminants of rye crops for centuries. When not lethal, defense chemicals produced by fungal endophytes may lead to lower productivity in cows and other livestock feeding on infected forage. Reduced nutritional quality of infected plant tissue also lowers the performance of farm animals, compounding the effect of reduced feed uptake when provided with infected plant matter. Reduced frequency of pregnancy and birth has also been reported in cattle and horses fed with infected forage. Endophytic fungi can even cause severe toxicity in grazing livestock, which is often referred to as fescue toxicosis. Cattle that graze on tall fescue (Festuca arundinacea) develop symptoms such as fescue foot, fat necrosis and summer slump, which is a general malady of fescue toxicosis. Fungi, plants and herbivore population sizes can have a cyclical predator-prey pattern. Infection rates of endophytic fungi in plants tend to increase with rise in grazing pressure. If endophytic fungi becomes highly prevalent in grazer food sources, it can even lead to population crashes in grazing animals. Consequently, the dairy and meat-production industries must endure substantial economic losses.

Fungal resistance to herbivores represents an environmentally sustainable alternative to pesticides that has experienced reasonable success in agricultural applications. The organic farming industry has embraced mycorrhizal symbionts as one tool for improving yields and protecting plants from damage. Infected crops of soybean, ribwort plantain, cabbage, banana, coffee bean plant and tomato all show markedly lower rates of herbivore damage compared to uninfected plants. Endophytic fungi show great promise as a means of indirect biocontrol in large-scale agricultural applications. The potential for biotechnology to improve crop populations through inoculation with modified fungal strains could reduce toxicity to livestock and improve yields of human-consumed foods. The endophyte, either with detrimental genes removed or beneficial new genes added, is used as a surrogate host to transform the crops genetically. An endophyte of ryegrass has been genetically transformed in this way and used successfully to deter herbivores.

Understanding how to mediate top-down effects on crop populations caused by the enemies of herbivores as well as bottom-up effects of chemical composition in infected plants has important consequences for the management of agricultural industries. The selection of endophytes for agricultural use must be careful and consideration must be paid to the specific impacts of infection on all species of pest and predators or parasites, which may vary on a geographic scale. The union of ecological and molecular techniques to increase yield without sacrificing the health of the local or global environment is a growing area of research.

=== Pharmaceutical ===
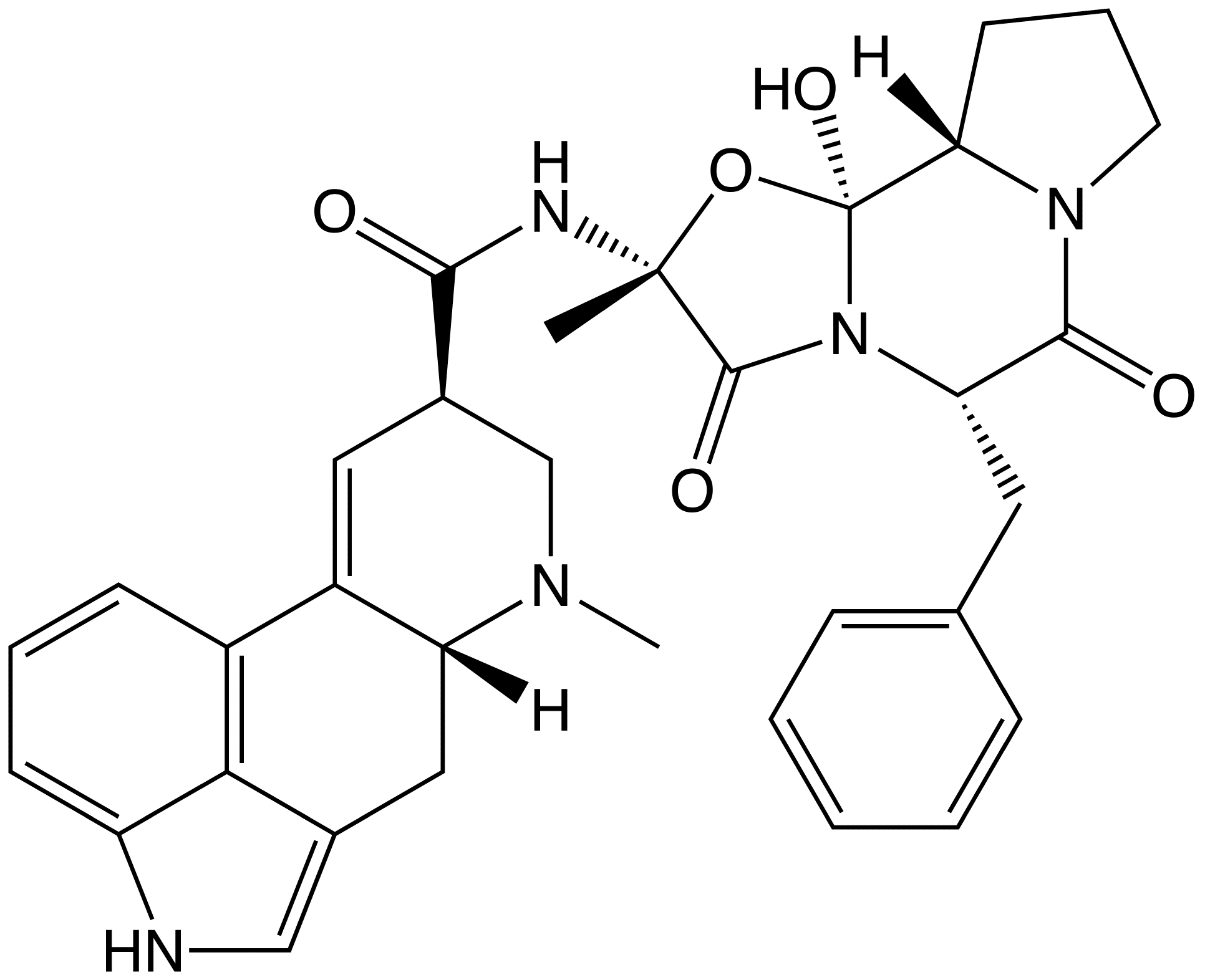
Ergotamine, a mycotoxin produced by Claviceps spp. which infects rye and related grasses, causing poisoning of livestock and humans

Many secondary metabolites from endophyte-plant interactions have also been isolated and used in raw or derived forms to produce a variety of drugs treating many conditions. The toxic properties of ergot alkaloids also make them useful in the treatment of headaches and throughout the process of giving birth by inducing contractions and stemming hemorrhages. Drugs used to treat Parkinson's disease have been created from isolates of ergot toxins, although health risks may accompany their use. Ergotamine has also been used to synthesize lysergic acid diethylamide because of its chemical similarity to lysergic acid. The generally chemically based defense properties of endophytic fungi make them a perfect group of organisms to search for new antibiotic compounds within, as other fungi have in the past yielded such useful drugs as penicillin and streptomycin and plants use their antibiotic qualities as a defense against pathogens.

== See also ==
- Arbuscular mycorrhiza
- Chemical ecology
- Endophytes
- Glomeromycota
- Interspecies communication
- Mutualism
- Mycorrhizae
- Plant defense against herbivory

== Further references ==
- Redlin, S.C. & Carris, L.M. (1996). Endophytic fungi in grasses and woody plants: Systematics, ecology, and evolution. St. Paul, Minn: APS Press. ISBN 978-0-89054-213-2.
- Cheplick, G.P. & Faeth, S.H. (2009). Ecology and evolution of the grass-endophyte symbiosis. Oxford: Oxford University Press. ISBN 978-0-19-530808-2.
- Bacon, C.W. & White, J.F. (1994). Biotechnology of endophytic fungi of grasses. Boca Raton: CRC Press. ISBN 978-0-8493-6276-7.
- White, J.F. & Torres, M.S. (2009). Defensive mutualism in microbial symbiosis. Boca Raton: CRC Press. ISBN 978-1-4200-6931-0.
- Heijden, M.G.A. & Sanders, I.R. (2002). Mycorrhizal ecology. Berlin: Springer. ISBN 978-3-540-42407-9.
- Belesky, D. P., & Bacon, C. W. (2009) Tall fescue and associated mutualistic toxic fungal endophytes in agroecosystems. Toxin Reviews. 28(2-3): 102-117 doi:10.1080/15569540903082143
- Bazely, D. R., Vicari, M., Emmerich, S., Filip, L., Lin, D., & Inman, A. (1997). Interactions between herbivores and Endophyte-Infected Festuca rubra from the Scottish Islands of St. Kilda, Benbecula and Rum. British Ecological Society. 34(4):847–860 https://doi.org/10.2307%2F2405276
- Ahlholm, J. U., M. Helander, S. Lehtimaki, P. Wali, & K. Saikkonen. (2002). Vertically transmitted fungal endophytes: different responses of host parasite systems to environmental conditions. OIKOS 99:173183. https://doi.org/10.1034%2Fj.1600-0706.2002.990118.x
- Clay, K. (1987). Effects of fungal endophytes on the seed and seedling biology of Lolium perenne and Festuca arundinacea. Oecologia (Berline). 73: 358–362 https://doi.org/10.1007%2Fbf00385251
- Li, X., Song, M., Yao, X., Chai, Q., Simpson, W. R., Li, C., & Nan, Z. (2017) The Effect of Seed-Borne Fungi and Epichloë Endophyte on Seed Germination and Biomass of Elymus sibiricus. Frontiers in Microbiology 8: 2488 https://doi.org/10.3389%2Ffmicb.2017.02488
