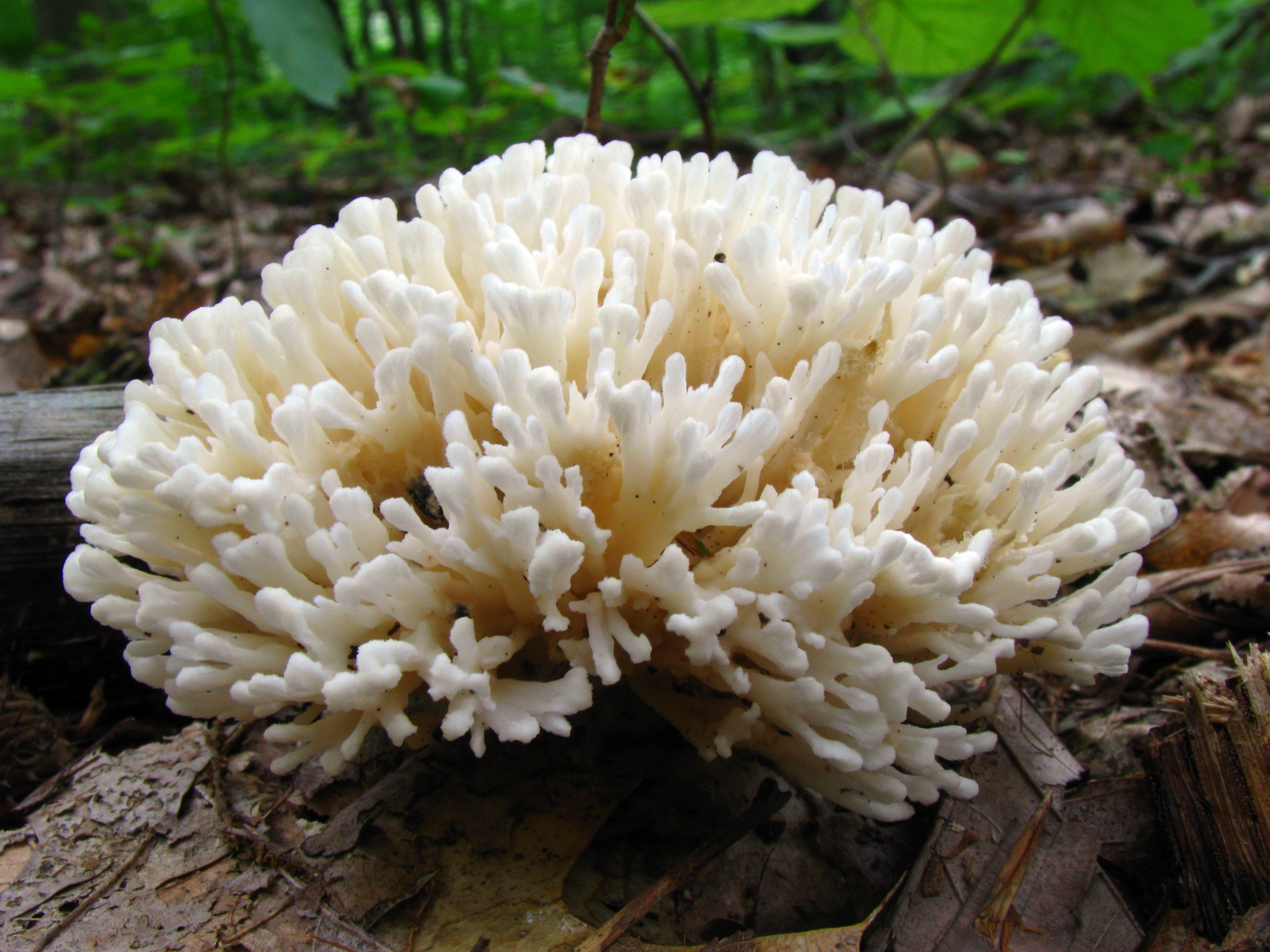
- Sebacina schweinitzii

Scientific classification
- Domain: Eukaryota
- Kingdom: Fungi
- Division: Basidiomycota
- Class: Agaricomycetes
- Order: Sebacinales
- Family: Sebacinaceae
- Genus: Sebacina; Tul. & C.Tul. (1871)

Type species
- Sebacina incrustans (Pers.) Tul. & C.Tul. (1871)

Species
- Sebacina alutacea Sebacina aureomagnifica Sebacina confusa Sebacina cystidiata Sebacina dimitica Sebacina epigaea Sebacina flagelliformis Sebacina guayanensis Sebacina incrustans Sebacina ocreata Sebacina pileata Sebacina pseudocandida Sebacina schweinitzii Sebacina sparassoidea Sebacina tomentosa

Synonyms
- Cristella Pat. (1887); Soppittiella Massee (1892); Tremellodendron G.F. Atk. (1902); Atkinsonia Lloyd (1916)

= Sebacina =

Genus of fungi

Sebacina is a genus of fungi in the family Sebacinaceae. Its species are mycorrhizal, forming a range of associations with trees and other plants. Basidiocarps (fruit bodies) are produced on soil and litter, sometimes partly encrusting stems of living plants. The fruit bodies are cartilaginous to rubbery-gelatinous and variously effused (corticioid) to coral-shaped (clavarioid). The genus has a cosmopolitan distribution.

== Taxonomy ==
=== History ===
The genus was first published in 1871 by Louis and Charles Tulasne who had discovered that two species (Sebacina incrustans and Sebacina epigaea) previously referred to Corticium or Thelephora possessed septate basidia, similar to those found in the genus Tremella. Although it was unusual at that time to separate fungal genera on purely microscopic characters, Sebacina was erected for effused, Corticium-like fungi with tremelloid basidia.

Subsequent authors added many additional species of corticioid fungi with septate basidia to the genus. Most, however, proved unrelated to Sebacina. In 1957 Ervin referred some Sebacina species to Heterochaetella, Bourdotia, and Exidiopsis. In 1961, Wells transferred all Sebacina species having clamp connections on their hyphae to the genus Exidiopsis, retaining Sebacina for the minority of species lacking clamp connections.

=== Current status ===
Molecular research, based on cladistic analysis of DNA sequences, has shown that Sebacina as previously understood includes the genus Tremellodendron (established for a group of species with coral-like basidiocarps), but does not include some species that are not closely related to the type. These latter species have been placed in the genera Helvellosebacina and Paulisebacina.

== Description ==
Fruit bodies are typically cartilaginous or rubbery-gelatinous. In effused species (those that spread out loosely or flat), they are formed on the soil surface or in leaf litter, often encrusting fallen twigs and debris, sometimes encrusting the stem bases of living plants. In the type species, irregular or coral-like outgrowths may also be produced. In some species, fruit bodies are entirely coral- or net-like. Spores are white in mass.

=== Microscopic characters ===
Fruit bodies are composed of hyphae lacking clamp connections in a gelatinous matrix. In several species the hyphal system is dimitic. The spore-bearing surface is initially covered in a layer of weakly branched hyphidia below which the basidia are formed. The basidia are tremelloid (ellipsoid and vertically septate), giving rise to long, sinuous sterigmata or epibasidia on which the basidiospores are produced. These spores are typically ellipsoid to oblong.

== Ecology ==
Sebacina species were assumed to be saprotrophic until DNA analysis of mycorrhizal roots showed that they were ectomycorrhizal plant associates.
