= Serendipita indica =

Scientific classification
- Kingdom: Fungi
- Division: Basidiomycota
- Class: Agaricomycetes
- Order: Sebacinales
- Family: Serendipitaceae
- Genus: Serendipita
- Species: S. indica

Binomial name
- Serendipita indica (Sav.Verma, Aj.Varma, Rexer, G.Kost & P.Franken) M. Weiß, Waller, A. Zuccaro & Selosse (2016)

Synonyms
- Piriformospora indica

Genus of fungi

Serendipita indica (synonym Piriformospora indica) is a fungal species of the order Sebacinales. It is an endophytic root-colonising species, discovered from orchid plants in the Thar Desert in Rajasthan, India by Prof. Ajit Verma and group, School of Life Sciences, Jawaharlal Nehru University, New Delhi. The fungus has typical pear-shaped chlamydospores. S. indica can be easily grown on various substrates. It has been found to promote plant growth during its mutualistic symbiotic relationship with a wide variety of plants. Experiments have shown that S. indica increases the resistance of colonized plants against fungal pathogens. It has also been found in experiments with barley that S. indica-inoculated plants are tolerant to salt stress and more resistant to root pathogens. S. indica-infested roots also show antioxidant capacity. The fungus also induces systemic disease resistance in plants. S. indica was found to require host cell death for proliferation during mutualistic symbiosis in barley. Its genome has been sequenced and was published in 2011.
