= Endophyte =

Endosymbiotic bacterium or fungus

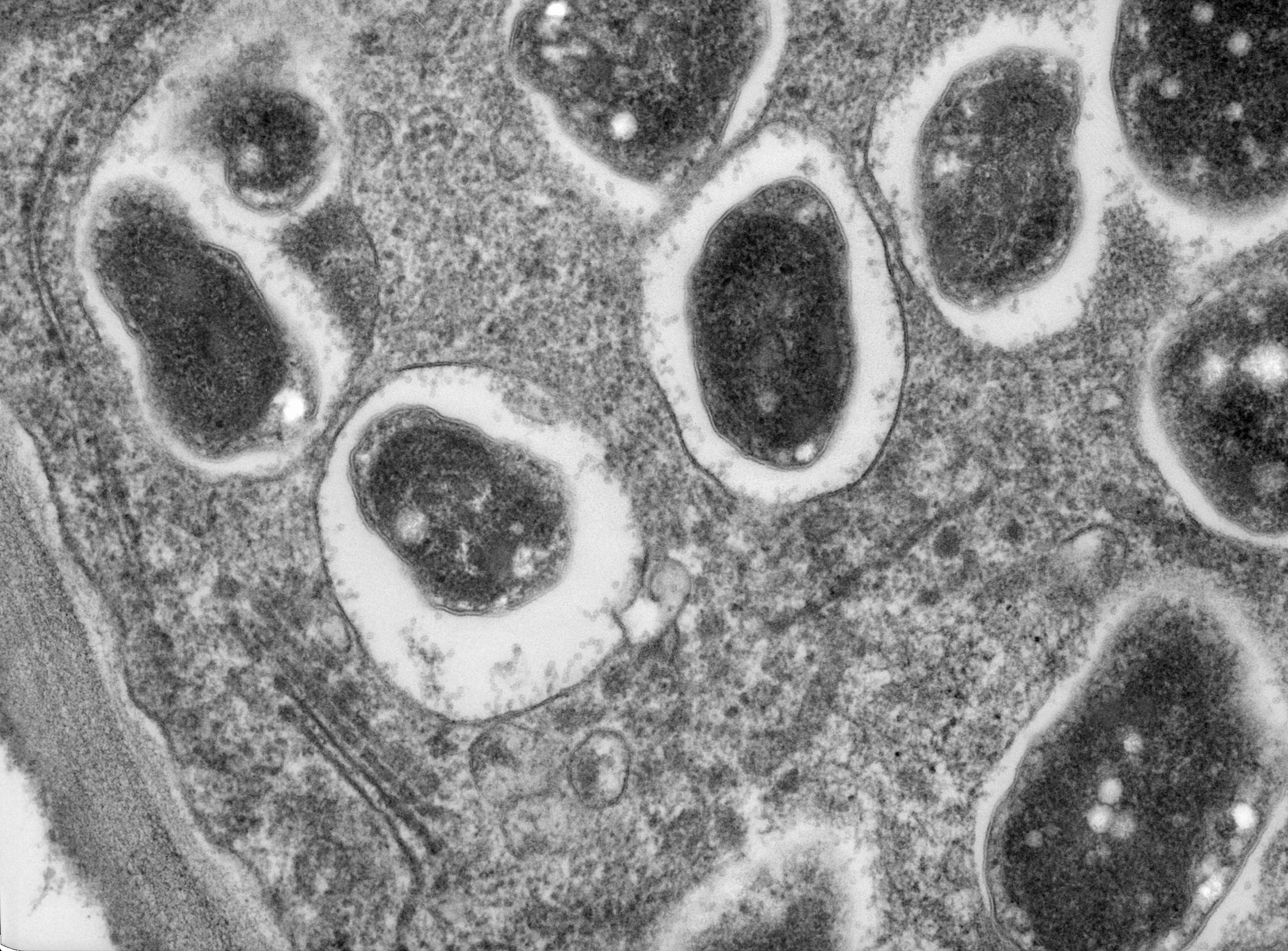
Transmission electron microscope image of a cross section through a soybean (Glycine max) root nodule. The nitrogen fixing bacteria, and fungi Bradyrhizobium japonicum, infects the roots and establishes a symbiosis. This high magnification image shows part of a cell with single bacteroid (bacterium-like cell or modified bacterial cell) within their symbiosomes. In this image, you can also see endoplasmic reticulum, Golgi apparatus and cell wall.

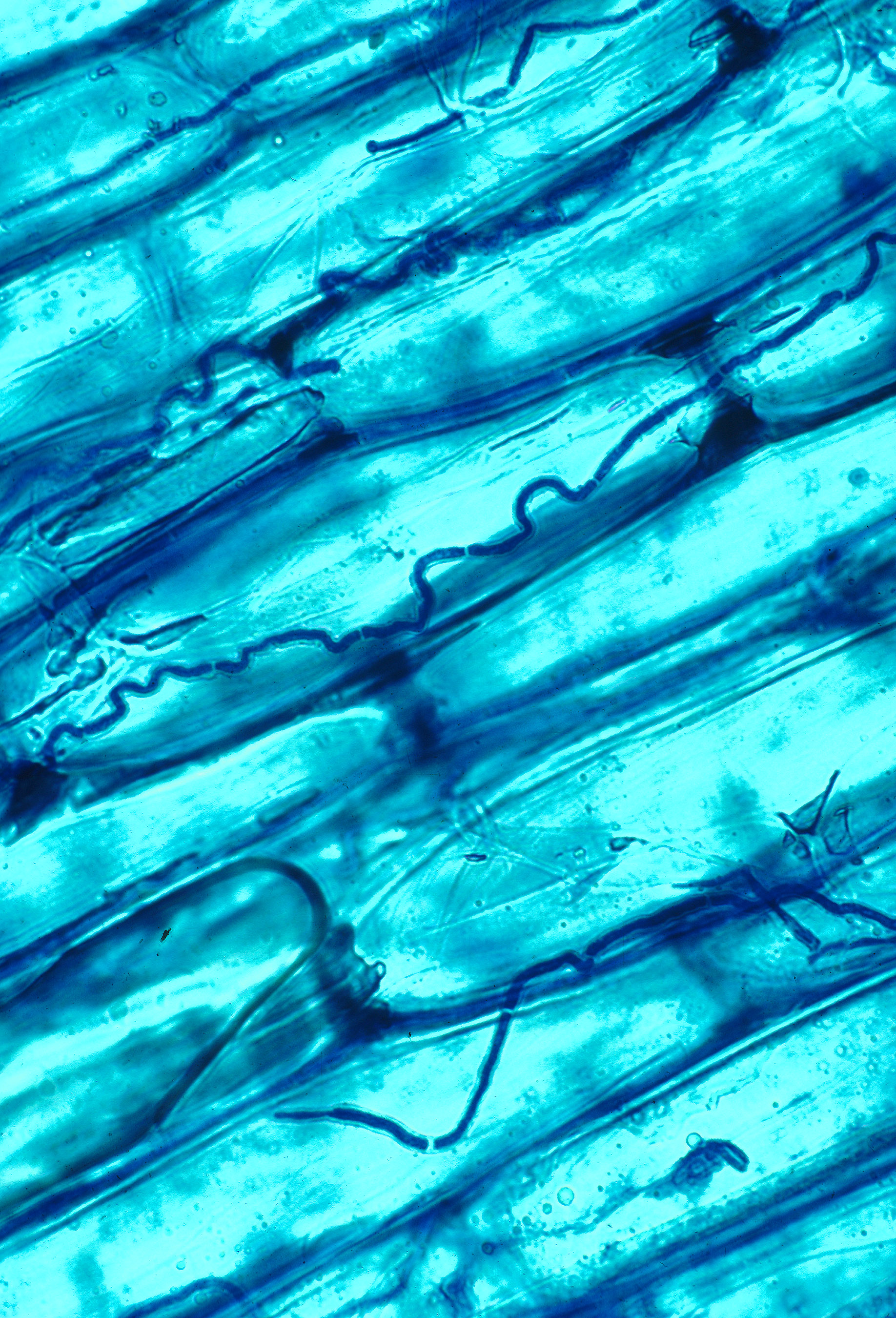
Grass sheath and blade tissues containing endophytic fungal thread

An endophyte is an endosymbiont, often a bacterium or fungus, that lives within a plant for at least part of its life cycle without causing apparent disease. Endophytes are ubiquitous and have been found in all species of plants studied to date; however, most of the endophyte/plant relationships are not well understood. Some endophytes may enhance host growth and nutrient acquisition and improve the plant's ability to tolerate abiotic stresses, such as drought, and decrease biotic stresses by enhancing plant resistance to insects, pathogens and herbivores. Although endophytic bacteria and fungi are frequently studied, endophytic archaea are increasingly being considered for their role in plant growth promotion as part of the core microbiome of a plant.

== History ==
Endophytes were first described by the German botanist Johann Heinrich Friedrich Link in 1809. They were thought to be plant parasitic fungi and they were later termed as "microzymas" by the French scientist Béchamp. There was a belief that plants were healthy under sterile conditions and it was not until 1887 that Victor Galippe discovered bacteria normally occurring inside plant tissues.

== Transmission ==
Endophytes may be transmitted either vertically (directly from parent to offspring) or horizontally (among individuals). Vertically transmitted fungal endophytes are typically considered clonal and transmit via fungal hyphae penetrating the embryo within the host's seeds, while reproduction of the fungi through asexual conidia or sexual spores leads to horizontal transmission, where endophytes may spread between plants in a population or community.

== Symbiosis ==
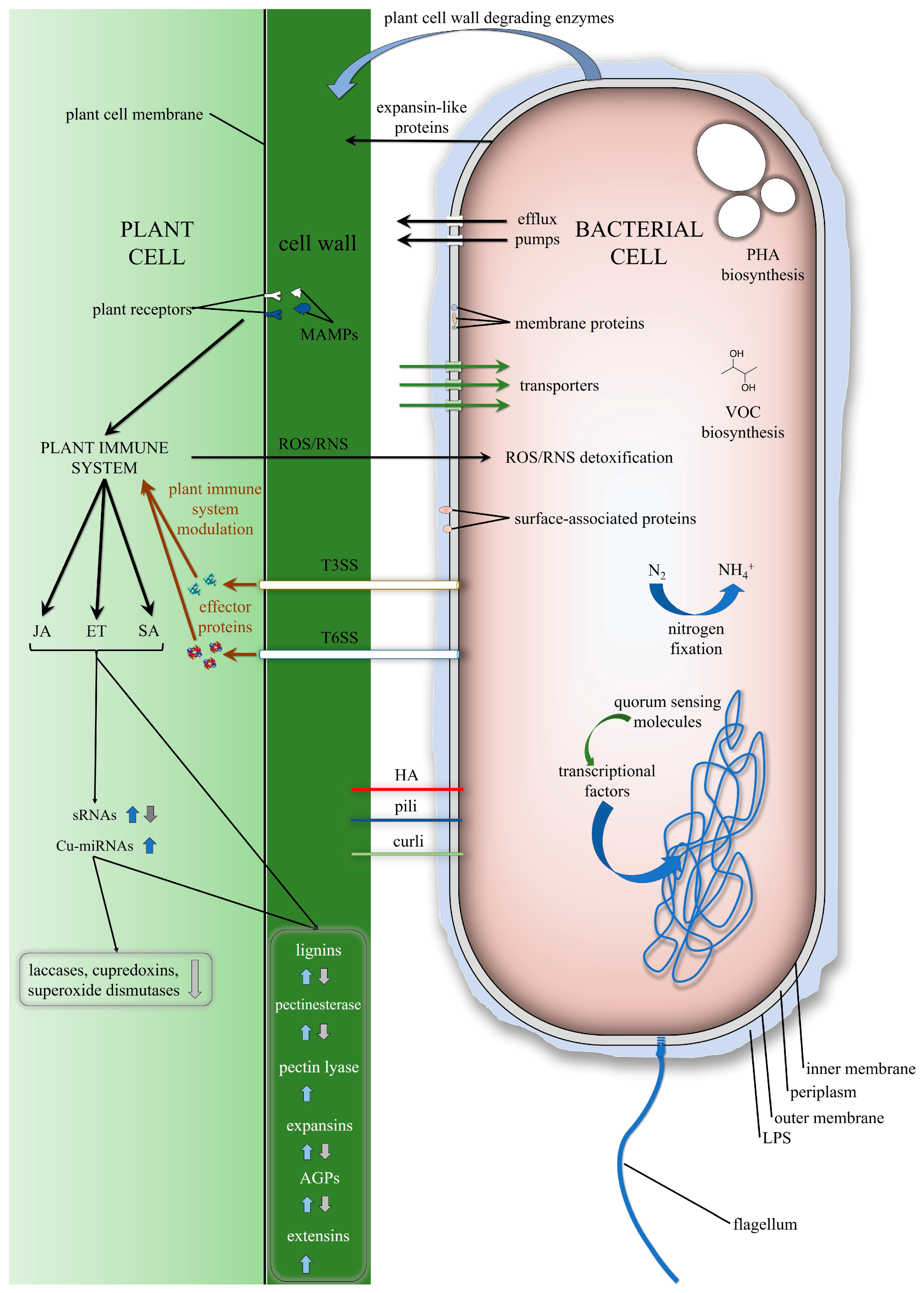
Plant-endophytic bacteria interactions Abbreviations: polyhydroxyalkanoates (PHA), volatile organic compounds (VOC), reactive oxygen species (ROS), reactive nitrogen species (RNS), type III secretion system (T3SS), type VI secretion system (T6SS), hemagglutinins (HA), small RNAs (sRNAs), copper-micro RNAs (Cu-miRNAs), lipopolysaccharide (LPS), arabinogalactan proteins (AGPs), microbe-associated molecular patterns (MAMPs), jasmonic acid (JA), ethylene (ET), salicylic acid (SA). The arrows pointing upwards indicate an increase, while the ones pointing downwards indicate a decrease in the expression levels.

Most endophyte-plant relationships are still not well understood. However, recently it was shown that endophytes are transmitted from one generation to another via seeds, in a process called vertical transmission. Endophytes and plants often engage in mutualism, with endophytes primarily aiding in the health and survival of the host plant with issues such as pathogens and disease, water stress, heat stress, nutrient availability and poor soil quality, salinity, and herbivory. In exchange the endophyte receives carbon for energy from the plant host. Plant-microbe interactions are not strictly mutualistic, as endophytic fungi can potentially become pathogens or saprotrophs, usually when the plant is stressed. Endophytes may become active and reproduce under specific environmental conditions or when their host plants are stressed or begin to senesce, thereby limiting the amount of carbon provided to the endophyte.

Endophytes may benefit host plants by preventing other pathogenic or parasitic organisms from colonizing them. Endophytes can extensively colonize plant tissues and competitively exclude other potential pathogens. Some fungal and bacterial endophytes have proven to increase plant growth and improve overall plant hardiness.

Studies have shown that endophytic fungi grow in a very intimate interaction with their host plant cells. Fungal hyphae have been seen growing either flattened or wedged against plant cells. This growth pattern indicates that fungal hyphae are substantially attached to the plant host's cell wall, but do not invade plant cells. Endophytic fungal hyphae appear to grow at the same rate as their host leaves, within the intercellular spaces of the plant tissue.

The presence of certain fungal endophytes in host meristems, leaves and reproductive structures has been shown to dramatically enhance the survival of their hosts. This enhanced survivability is largely attributed to endophytic production of secondary metabolites which protect against herbivory as well as increased uptake of nutrients. Studies have also shown that during experimental circumstances endophytes contribute significantly to plant growth and fitness under light-limited conditions, and plants appear to have increased reliance on their endophytic symbiont under these conditions.

There is evidence that plants and endophytes engage in communication with each other that can aid symbiosis. For example, plant chemical signals have been shown to activate gene expression in endophytes. One example of this plant-endosymbiont interaction occurs between dicotyledonous plants in the Convolvulaceae and clavicipitaceous fungi. When the fungus is in the plant it synthesizes ergoline alkaloids at a higher rate, compared to when it is grown apart from the plant. This supports the hypothesis that plant signaling is required in order to induce expression of endophytic secondary metabolites.

=== Effects on plant behavior ===
There are various behaviors that have been studied that resulted from endophyte symbiosis with plants. Through association with fungal endophytes, the root and shoot structures of Pseudotsuga menziesii (Douglas-fir) saplings in low-nutrient conditions have been shown to be elongated, as well as undergo overall biomass increases. The proposed mechanisms behind this include high inorganic phosphate solubilization ability by the fungi as well as organic phosphate mineralization, increased mycorrhizal associations through root colonization, and enhanced nitrogen and phosphorus uptake. Specific endophyte species can also stimulate root growth by increasing the flux of auxin to where the endophyte is.

Additionally, various reports on endophyte interactions have shown increased photosynthetic capacities of host plants as well as improved water relations. Improvements in water use efficiency were observed in higher CO_{2} concentrations and a further increase was seen in water deficit conditions. In addition, other various physiological pathways were activated upon endophytes interactions with host plants, enabling tighter water control and further water management, which are to be the main reasons behind improved water relations. Specifically, evidence points to endophytes producing ABA to affect stomatal conductance as well as microbial respiration and plants recycling CO_{2}.

However, the specific biochemical mechanisms behind these behavioral changes are still largely unknown and lower-level signal cascades have yet to be discovered. Furthermore, while the benefits of endophyte relations are well-studied, the costs of these relations are less well understood, such as the specific carbon costs, the system of endophyte governance, and the environmental conditions that facilitate a proper plant-endophyte relationship.

In an experiment investigating the interaction between Miscanthus sinensis and the plant endophyte Herbaspirillum frisingense, a roughly 20% increase in fresh biomass was observed in M. sinensis following inoculation with H. frisingense. However, unique to this experiment was the mode by which this was thought to happen. Inoculation saw an upregulation in the genes relevant to jasmonate and ethylene production in the plant roots, although the mechanism to this is still unknown. Specifically, H. frisingense was shown to upregulate ethylene receptors and repress ethylene response factors, overall leading to an increase in root growth. Additionally, H. frisingense is known to produce indoleacetic acid (IAA), and was also shown to manage IAA genes, indicating that there is an intricate balance maintained between ethylene and IAA by H. frisingense.

== Diversity ==
Endophytic species are very diverse; only a small minority of existing endophytes have been characterized. Many endophytes are in the phyla Basidiomycota and Ascomycota. Endophytic fungi may be from Hypocreales and Xylariales of the Sordariomycetes (Pyrenomycetes) class or from the class of Loculoascomycetes. One group of fungal endophytes are the arbuscular mycorrhizal fungi involving biotrophic Glomeromycota associated with various plant species. As often with other organisms associated with plants such as mycorrhizal fungus, endophytes gain carbon from their association with the plant host. Bacterial endophytes are polyphyletic, belonging to broad range of taxa, including α-Proteobacteria, β-Proteobacteria, γ-Proteobacteria, Firmicutes, Actinobacteria.

One or more endophytic organisms are found in nearly every land plant. It is suggested that areas of high plant diversity such as tropical rainforests may also contain the highest diversity of endophytic organisms that possess novel and diverse chemical metabolites. It has been estimated that there could be approximately 1 million endophytic fungi that exist in the world.

A diazotrophic bacterium isolated in lodgepole pines (Pinus contorta) in British Columbia, Canada, is Paenibacillus polymyxa, which may help its host by fixing nitrogen.

== Classification ==
Endophytes include a wide variety of microorganisms including fungi, bacteria and viruses. There are two different means of classifying endophytes.

=== Systemic and non-systemic ===
The first method divides endophytes into two categories: systemic (true) and nonsystemic (transient). These categories are based on the endophyte's genetics, biology, and mechanism of transmission from host to host. Systemic endophytes are defined as organisms that live within plant tissues for the entirety of its life cycle and participate in a symbiotic relationship without causing disease or harm to the plant at any point. Additionally, systemic endophytes concentrations and diversity do not change in a host with changing environmental conditions. Non-systemic or transient endophytes on the other hand vary in number and diversity within their plant hosts under changing environmental conditions. Non-systemic endophytes have also been shown to become pathogenic to their host plants under stressful or resource limited growing conditions. An example of this would be Colletotrichum fioriniae, which is an endophyte of many temperate broadleaved trees and shrubs, but can also be a pathogen on many fruits and some leaves.

=== Clavicipitaceous and non-clavicipitaceous ===
The second method divides fungal endophytes into four groups based on taxonomy and six other criteria: host range, host tissues colonized, in planta colonization, in planta biodiversity, mode of transmission and fitness benefits. These four groups are divided into clavicipitaceous endophytes (Class 1) and non-clavicipitaceous endophytes (Class 2, 3, and 4).

Class 1 endophytes are all phylogenetically related and proliferate within cool and warm season grasses. They typically colonize plant shoots where they form a systemic intercellular infection. Class 1 endophytes are mainly transmitted from host to host by vertical transmission, in which maternal plants pass fungi on to their offspring through seeds. Class 1 endophytes can further be divided into Types I, II and III. Among these three types of clavicipitaceous endophytes are different interactions with their plant hosts. These interaction range from pathogenic to symbiotic and symptomatic to asymptomatic. Type III clavicipitaceous endophytes grow within their plant host without manifesting symptoms of disease or harming their host. Class 1 endophytes typically confer benefits on their plant host such as improving plant biomass, increasing drought tolerance and increasing the production of chemicals that are toxic and unappetizing to animals, thereby decreasing herbivory. These benefits can vary depending on the host and environmental conditions.

Non-clavicipitaceous endophytes represent a polyphyletic group of organisms. Non-clavicipitaceous endophytes are typically Ascomycota fungi. The ecological roles of these fungi are diverse and still poorly understood. These endophyte plant interactions are widespread and have been found in nearly all land plants and ecosystems. Many non-clavicipitaceous endophytes have the ability to switch between endophytic behavior and free-living lifestyles. Non-clavicipitaceous endophytes are divided into class 2, 3 and 4. Class 2 endophytes can grow in plant tissues both above and below ground. This class of non-clavicipitaceous endophytes has been the most extensively researched and has been shown to enhance fitness benefits of their plant host as a result of habitat-specific stresses such as pH, temperature and salinity. Class 3 endophytes are restricted to growth in above ground plant tissues and form in localized areas of plant tissue. Class 4 endophytes are restricted to plant tissues below ground and can colonize much more of the plant tissue. These classes of non-clavicipitaceous endophytes have not been as extensively studied to date.

== Applications ==
Endophytes may have potential future applications in agriculture. Use of endophytes might potentially increase crop yields. Turfgrass seed of Festuca and Lolium perenne infected with fungal inoculants, Acremonium coenophialum and A. lolii, is commercially available for use in growing lawns which might require less pesticide use -the grasses are poisonous to cattle and more resistant to some insect damage. As of 1999 this is only available in the afore-mentioned lawn grasses, which are sold as 'low maintenance' cultivars. The fungi cause the grasses to contain toxic alkaloids. The products provide high resistance to foliar lawn pests such as billbugs, chinch bugs, sod webworms, fall army-worms and Argentine stem weevils, but offer little protection to pests of grass roots such as grubs. The endophytes can survive most pesticides and are even resistant to some fungicides, and are very suitable for use in Integrated Pest Management.

=== Biofuel ===
A 2008 experiment with an isolate of a fungus called NRRL 50072 found that this strain can produce a small amount of fuel-like hydrocarbon compounds which was promoted as "myco-diesel". It was hoped that perhaps in the future this might provide a possible source of biofuel. It was first misidentified as the endophyte Gliocladium roseum, but later research showed that it was in fact the saprophyte Ascocoryne sarcoides.

A strain of endophytic fungi which appeared to be closely related to Nigrograna mackinnonii which was isolated from a stem of the plant Guazuma ulmifolia collected in Ecuador was found to produce a variety of volatile organic compounds including terpenes and odd chain polyenes. The polyenes isolated from the fungus have properties that are sought in gasoline-surrogate biofuels.

=== Phytoremediation ===
Phytoremediation is an environmentally sustainable process where plants potentially able to break down or sequester, or stimulate micro-organisms in the soil to break down or sequester, certain organic pollutants and inorganic pollutants such as nickel in degraded ecosystems. In this endophytes may possibly assist plants in converting pollutants into less biologically harmful forms; in one of the few experiments performed a plasmid called TOM from a strain of a bacterium in the Burkholderia genus known as G4 which can break down trichloroethylene (TCE) was transferred to endophytes of popular trees; although it did not help the plants remove more of this chemical than non-inoculated plants, the plants transpired less TCE into the air. In another experiment Burkholderia bacteria with both the TOM plasmid as well as nickel resistance genes was inoculated into yellow lupine; this increased the root mass of the plants, but the amounts of TCE transpired was not statistically significant. Despite these failures, such techniques might lead to some future improvements.

Two strains of the endophytic fungi Pestalotiopsis microspora isolated from stems of plants from the Ecuadorian rainforest were shown in laboratory experiments to be able to digest polyurethane plastic as the fungus's sole carbon source in anaerobic conditions, although many other non-endophytic fungi have demonstrated this ability, and most isolates of endophytic fungi in this experiment could perform this to some degree.

=== Drug discovery ===
Endophytes produce a wide variety of secondary metabolites that might be useful as lead compounds in drug discovery. Endophyte bioprospecting has already yielded compounds with antibacterial, antifungal, antiviral, antiparasitic, cytotoxic, neuroprotective, antioxidant, insulin-mimetic, α-glucosidase inhibitory, and immunosuppressant properties. Manipulations of a plant's endosymbiots can affect plant development, growth and ultimately the quality and quantity of compounds harvested from the plant. Studies have shown endophytic fungi are able to produce secondary metabolites previously thought to be manufactured by their plant hosts. The presence of these metabolites in plants could be attributable to endophyte production alone, or to combined endophyte and plant production following transfer of the corresponding genes from endophyte to plant or vice versa.

A well known example of the discovery of chemicals derived from endophytic fungi is from the fungus Taxomyces andreanae isolated from the pacific yew Taxus brevifolia. T. andreanae produces paclitaxel, also known as taxol. This drug is important for the treatment of cancer. Other endophytes since have been discovered that also produce paclitaxel in other host species, but to date there has been no successful industrial source of paclitaxel created.

Endophytes have been discovered with various anti-tumor properties. Endophytic fungi produce many secondary compounds such as alkaloids, triterpenes and steroids which have been shown to have anti-tumor effects. The alkaloid beauvericin has been isolated from the fungus Fusarium oxysporum and has shown cytotoxicity against the tumor cells PC3, PANC-1, and A549. Two fusarubin derivatives: anhydrofusarubin and methyl ether of fusarubin were isolated from endophytic fungus Cladosporium sp. and have shown cytotoxicity against human leukemia (K-562). Three triterpenes were found in the endophyte Xylarialean sp., all three of these compounds displayed mild cytotoxic effects on tumor cells.

Some of the antimicrobial compounds produced by endophytic fungi are of interest in their effectiveness against pathogens which have developed resistances to antibiotics. Different fractions of Cladosporium sp. including secondary metabolite-methyl ether of fusarubin have shown antibacterial activity against Staphylococcus aureus, E. coli, P. aeruginosa, and Bacillus megaterium. Several isolates from the ascomycota Pestalotiopsis sp. have been shown to have a broad range of antimicrobial effects, even against methicillin-resistant Staphylococcus aureus. Also, compounds from the marine fungus Nigrospora sp. have activity against strains of multi drug-resistant Mycobacterium tuberculosis.

An endophytic fungus of the genus Pseudomassaria has been found in the rainforest of the Democratic Republic of the Congo. This fungus yields a metabolite that shows potential as an antidiabetic, also known as an insulin mimetic. This compound acts like insulin and has been shown to lower blood glucose levels in mouse model experiments.

=== Agriculture ===
Among the many promising applications of endophytic microbes are those intended to increase agricultural use of endophytes to produce crops that grow faster and are more resistant and hardier than crops lacking endophytes. Epichloë endophytes are being widely used commercially in turf grasses to enhance the performance of the turf and its resistance to biotic and abiotic stresses. Piriformospora indica is an interesting endophytic fungus of the order Sebacinales, the fungus is capable of colonising roots and forming symbiotic relationship with many plants.

Endophytes appear to enhance the growth of their plant host symbionts. Endophytes also provide their hosts with an increased resilience to both abiotic and biotic stressors such as drought, poor soils and herbivory. The increased growth and resilience is likely caused by the endophytes ability to improve plant nutrition or secondary metabolite production, as in the case of Phoma eupatorii's inhibition of the phytopathogen Phytophthora infestans. Endophytes accomplish this by increasing the uptake of valuable land limited nutrients from the soil such as phosphorus and making other plant nutrients available to plants such as rock phosphate and atmospheric nitrogen which are normally trapped in forms that are inaccessible to plants.

Many endophytes protect plants from herbivory from both insects and animals by producing secondary metabolites that are either unappetizing or toxic to the herbivore. Increasingly there has been great importance placed on endophytes that protect valuable crops from invasive insects. One example of an endophyte-plant-insect interaction is located in the New Zealand grasslands, where endophytes, known as AR1 and AR37 are utilized to protect valuable ryegrass from the Argentine stem weevil but remain palatable to another important food source, livestock.

There are several endophytes that have been discovered that exhibit insecticidal properties. One such endophyte comes from the Nodulisporium sp. which was first harvested from the plant Bontia daphnoides. Indole diterpenes, known as nodulisporic acids, have been harvested from this endophyte which have effective insecticidal properties against the blowfly larvae.

There are many obstacles to successfully implementing the use of endophytes in agriculture. Despite the many known benefits that endophytes may confer to their plant hosts, conventional agricultural practices continue to take priority. Current agriculture relies heavily on fungicides and high levels of chemical fertilizers. The use of fungicides has a negative effect on endophytic fungi and fertilizers reduce a plant's dependence on its endophytic symbiont. Despite this, the interest and use of bio-insecticides and using endophytes to aid in plant growth is increasing as organic and sustainable agriculture is considered more important. As humans become more aware of the damage that synthetic insecticides cause to the environment and beneficial insects such as bees and butterflies biological insecticides may become more important to the agricultural industry.

== See also ==
- Biofertilizer
- List of endophytes
- Plant use of endophytic fungi in defense
- Arbuscular mycorrhiza
- Mycorrhiza
- Rhizobia
- Plant microbiome
- Microbiota
