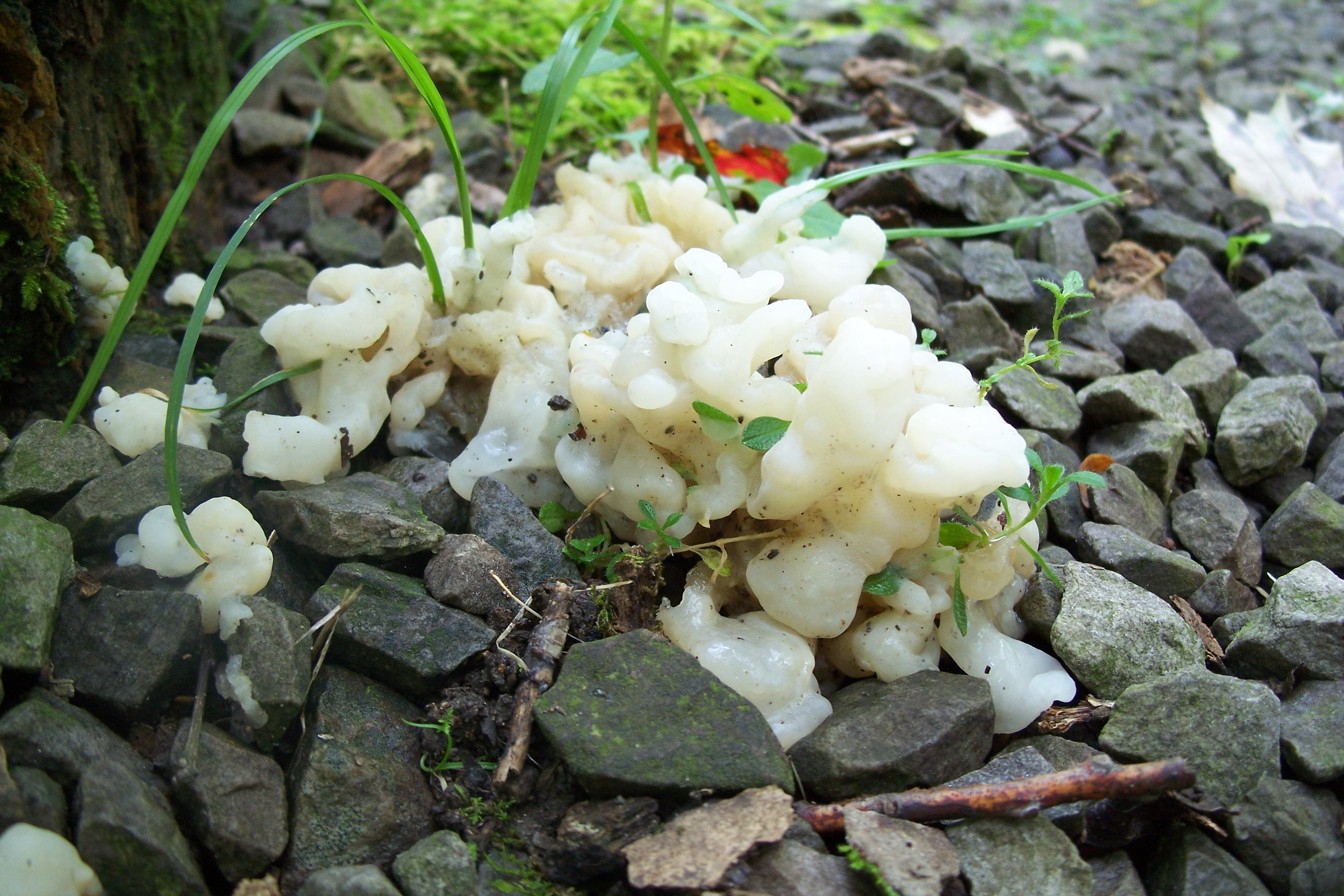
- Sebacina sparassoidea

Scientific classification
- Kingdom: Fungi
- Division: Basidiomycota
- Class: Agaricomycetes
- Order: Sebacinales
- Family: Sebacinaceae; K. Wells & Oberw. (1982)

Genera
- Chaetospermum; Ditangium; Globulisebacina; Helvellosebacina; Paulisebacina; Sebacina; Tremelloscypha

= Sebacinaceae =

Genus of fungi

The Sebacinaceae are a family of fungi in the order Sebacinales. Species produce basidiocarps (fruit bodies} that are gelatinous or cartilaginous and variously corticioid, clavarioid, bracket-like, or jelly-like. Microscopically, all have septate basidia and hyphae lacking clamp connections. Many but not all species are mycorrhizal, forming associations with a wide range of plants.
