= Pseudomassaria =

Scientific classification
- Kingdom: Fungi
- Division: Ascomycota
- Class: Sordariomycetes
- Order: Amphisphaeriales
- Family: Hyponectriaceae
- Genus: Pseudomassaria; Jacz.

Type species
- Pseudomassaria chondrospora (Ces.) Jacz.

Genus of fungi

Pseudomassaria is a genus of fungi in the family Hyponectriaceae.
