= Serendipitaceae =

Scientific classification
- Kingdom: Fungi
- Division: Basidiomycota
- Class: Agaricomycetes
- Order: Sebacinales
- Family: Serendipitaceae; M. Weiß, Waller, A. Zuccaro & Selosse (2016)

Genera
- Serendipita

Genus of fungi

The Serendipitaceae are a family of fungi in the order Sebacinales. Species do not produce visible basidiocarps (fruit bodies), but form septate basidia on thin, trailing hyphae. Species are mycorrhizal, forming associations with a wide range of plants. Most species have only been detected through environmental DNA sampling or laboratory cultures. The family currently contains the single genus Serendipita.
