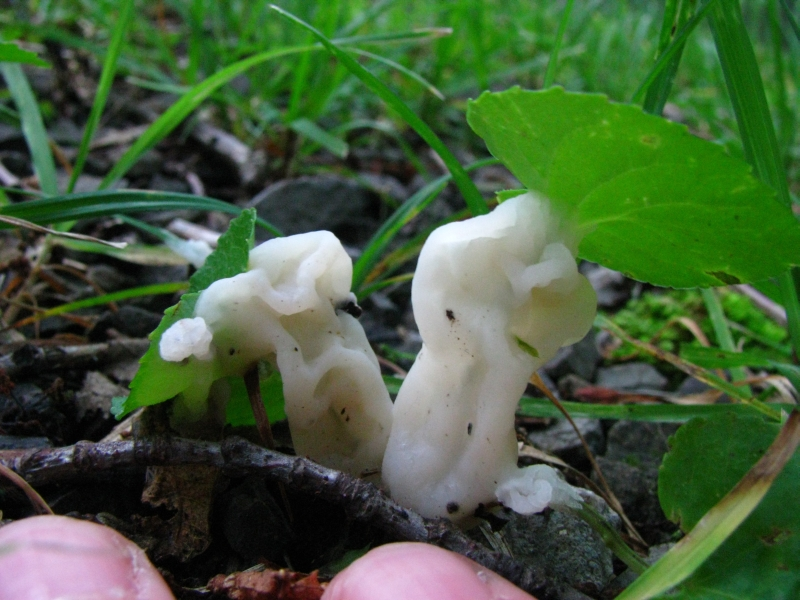
- Helvellosebacina concrescens

Scientific classification
- Kingdom: Fungi
- Division: Basidiomycota
- Class: Agaricomycetes
- Order: Sebacinales; M.Weiss, Selosse, Rexer, A.Urb & Oberw. (2004)

Type genus
- Sebacina Tul. & C.Tul. (1873)

Families
- Sebacinaceae; Serendipitaceae

= Sebacinales =

Order of fungi

The Sebacinales are an order of fungi in the class Agaricomycetes. Taxa have a widespread distribution and are mostly terrestrial, many forming mycorrhizas with a wide variety of plants, including orchids.
