= PHBV =

Names
- Other names Poly(β-hydroxybutyrate-β-hydroxyvalerate); Poly(3-hydroxybutyric acid-co-β-hydroxyvaleric acid); Polyhydroxybutyrate-co-hydroxyvalerate; Biopol P(3HB-3HV)

Identifiers
CAS Number	80181-31-3
3D model (JSmol)	Interactive image
Abbreviations	PHBV; P(3HB-co-3HV)
ChemSpider	96951
ECHA InfoCard	100.125.321
PubChem CID	107801
CompTox Dashboard (EPA)	DTXSID301001078
- InChI: InChI=1S/C5H10O3.C4H8O3/c1-2-4(6)3-5(7)8;1-3(5)2-4(6)7/h4,6H,2-3H2,1H3, (H,7,8);3,5H,2H2,1H3,(H,6,7) Key: IUPHTVOTTBREAV-UHFFFAOYSA-N
- SMILES: CCC(CC(=O)O)O.CC(CC(=O)O)O

Properties
Chemical formula	[COCH_{2}CH(CH_{3})O]_{m}[COCH_{2}CH(C_{2}H_{5})O]_{n}
- Except where otherwise noted, data are given for materials in their standard state (at 25 °C [77 °F], 100 kPa). Infobox references

Poly(3-hydroxybutyrate-co-3-hydroxyvalerate), commonly known as PHBV, is a polyhydroxyalkanoate-type polymer. It is biodegradable, nontoxic, biocompatible plastic produced naturally by bacteria and a good alternative for many non-biodegradable synthetic polymers. It is a thermoplastic linear aliphatic polyester. It is obtained by the copolymerization of 3-hydroxybutanoic acid and 3-hydroxypentanoic acid. PHBV is used in speciality packaging, orthopedic devices and in controlled release of drugs. PHBV undergoes bacterial degradation in the environment.

== History ==
PHBV was first manufactured in 1983 by Imperial Chemical Industries (ICI). It is commercialized under the trade name Biopol. ICI (Zeneca) sold it to Monsanto in 1996. This was then obtained by Metabolix in 2001. Biomer L is the trade name of PHBV from Biomer.

== Synthesis ==
PHBV is synthesized by bacteria as storage compounds under growth limiting conditions. It can be produced from glucose and propionate by the recombinant Escherichia coli strains. Many other bacteria like Paracoccus denitrificans and Ralstonia eutropha are also capable of producing it.

It can also be synthesized from genetically engineered plants.

PHBV is a copolymer of 3-hydroxybutanoic acid and 3-hydroxypentanoic acid. PHBV may also be synthesized from butyrolactone and valerolactone in the presence of oligomeric aluminoxane as catalyst.

== Structure ==
The monomers, 3-hydroxybutanoic acid and 3-hydroxypentanoic acid, are joined by ester bonds; the back bone of the polymer is made up of carbon and oxygen atoms. The property of the PHBV depends upon the ratio of these two monomers in it. 3-hydroxybutanoic acid provides stiffness while 3-hydroxypentanoic acid promotes flexibility. Thus PHBV can be made to resemble either polypropylene or polyethylene by changing the ratio of monomers. Increase in the ratio of 3-hydroxybutanoic acid to 3-hydroxypentanoic acid results in an increase in melting point, water permeability, glass transition temperature (T_{g}) and tensile strength. However impact resistance is reduced.

== Properties ==
PHBV is a thermoplastic polymer. It is brittle, has low elongation at break and low impact resistance.

== Uses ==
PHBV find its application in controlled release of drugs, medical implants and repairs, specialty packaging, orthopedic devices and manufacturing bottles for consumer goods. It is also biodegradable which can be used as an alternative to non biodegradable plastics

PHBV can also be used as a bio-based and biodegradable alternative to conventional and synthetic SPF boosters such as PMMA and Styrene/Acrylate copolymers, which generate persistent microplastics upon disposal. In this regard, the commercial exploitation of PHBV is already being commercially promoted, notably by the Swedish company Bioextrax.

== Degradation ==
When disposed, PHBV degrades into carbon dioxide and water. PHBV undergo bacterial degradation. PHBV, just like fats to human, is an energy source to microorganisms. Enzymes produced by them degrade it and are consumed.

PHBV has a low thermal stability and the cleavage occurs at the ester bond by β elimination reaction.

Hydrolytic degradation occurs only slowly making it usable in medical applications.

== Drawbacks ==
PHBV, being biodegradable, biocompatible and renewable, is a good alternative for synthetic nonbiodegradable polymers made from petroleum. But it has the following drawbacks,

- Expensive
- Low thermal stability
- Brittle
- Primitive mechanical properties
- Processing difficulty

== See also ==
- Polyhydroxyalkanoates
- Polyhydroxybutyrate
- Biodegradable plastics
