= Poly((R)-hydroxyalkanoic acid) depolymerase =

Poly((R)-hydroxyalkanoic acid) depolymerase may refer to:

- Poly(3-hydroxybutyrate) depolymerase, an enzyme
- Poly(3-hydroxyoctanoate) depolymerase, an enzyme
