= Ammonium laurate =

Names
- IUPAC name azanium;dodecanoate
- Other names azanium dodecanoate, ammonium dodecanoate

Identifiers
CAS Number	2437-23-2
3D model (JSmol)	Interactive image
ChemSpider	140381
ECHA InfoCard	100.017.672
EC Number	219-439-6
PubChem CID	159661
UNII	50IRX6VLIF
CompTox Dashboard (EPA)	DTXSID6027476
- InChI: InChI=1S/C12H24O2.H3N/c1-2-3-4-5-6-7-8-9-10-11-12(13)14;/h2-11H2,1H3,(H,13,14);1H3 Key: VJCJAQSLASCYAW-UHFFFAOYSA-N
- SMILES: CCCCCCCCCCCC(=O)[O-].[NH4+]

Properties
Chemical formula	C_{12}H_{27}NO_{2}
Molar mass	217.353 g·mol^{−1}
Appearance	off-white solid
Density	1.79 g/cm^{3}
Melting point	45 °C
Boiling point	100 °C
Solubility in water	soluble

Hazards
- GHS labelling
Pictograms	(GHS05: Corrosive)
Signal word	Danger
Flash point	134.1 °C
- Except where otherwise noted, data are given for materials in their standard state (at 25 °C [77 °F], 100 kPa). Infobox references

Ammonium laurate is a chemical compound with the chemical formula NH_{4}C_{6}H_{7}O_{6}.This is an organic ammonium salt of lauric acid.

== Synthesis ==
Ammonium laurate can be prepared by mixing dry ammonia with an aqueous solution of pure lauric acid. This industrial method requires introducing ammonia gas into a lauric acid solution dissolved in a non-water-based solvent. The process is conducted under carefully regulated temperature and pressure parameters to maximize both the quantity and quality of the resulting product.

Also, ammonium laurate can be obtained by reacting lauric acid with ammonium hydroxide. This process generally begins with dissolving lauric acid in a solvent like ethanol, followed by the addition of ammonium hydroxide to the mixture.

== Physical properties ==
The compound typically appears as a white to off-white solid or powder. It is soluble in water, making it useful in various applications.

The substance is harmful when inhaled, ingested, or put in contact with the skin. It can cause skin irritation and eye damage. It can emit harmful fumes under fire conditions.

== Uses ==
The compound is used as a surfactant, wetting agent, emulsifier with foaming properties.

Also, ammonium laurate is used in the extraction and recovery of polyhydroxyalkanoates (PHAs), biodegradable polymers produced by various microorganisms.
