= Formamidase =

Class of enzymes

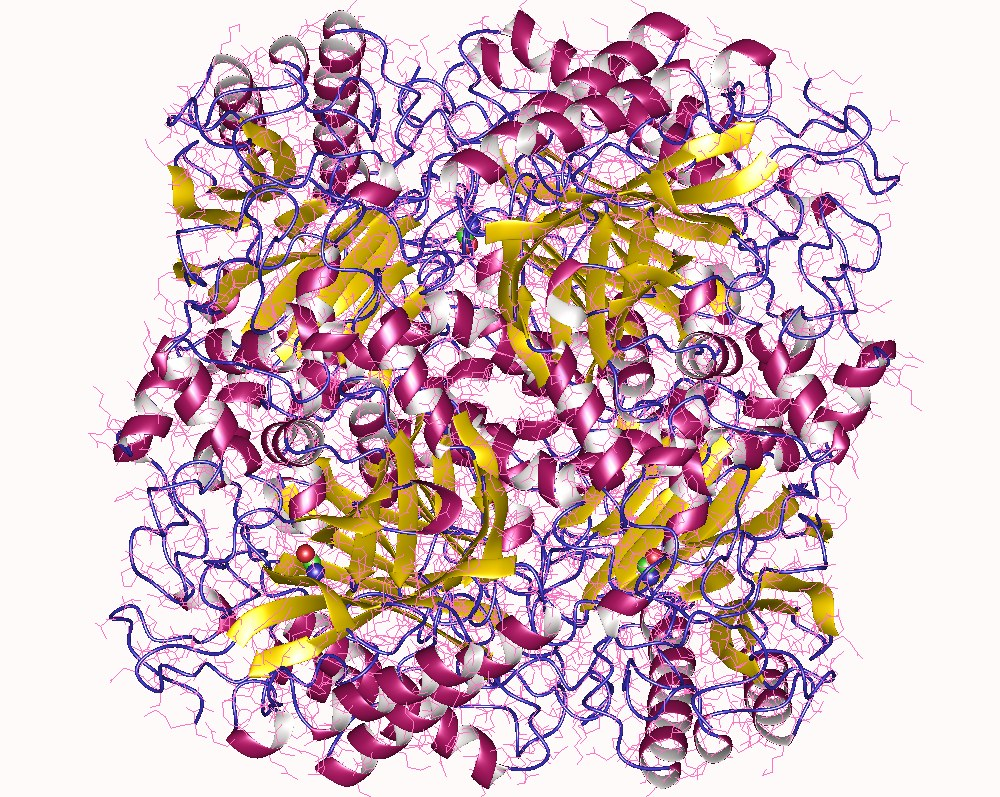
- Formamidase hexamer, Helicobacter pylori

Identifiers
- EC no.: 3.5.1.49
- CAS no.: 9013-59-6

Databases
- BRENDA: enzyme data
- ExPASy: NiceZyme view
- KEGG: enzyme entry
- MetaCyc: metabolic pathway
- Rhea: reactions
- PDB structures: RCSB PDB PDBe PDBsum
- Gene Ontology: AmiGO / QuickGO
Search
- PMC: articles
- PubMed: articles
- NCBI: proteins

Formamidase (EC 3.5.1.49) is an enzyme characterised from Pseudomonas aeruginosa and Alcaligenes eutrophus that catalyzes the chemical reaction which hydrolyses formamide to formic acid and ammonia:

HCONH_{2}
H_{2}O
NH_{3}
HCOOH

The formamide binding site in Helicobacter pylori consists of a cysteine-glutamate-lysine catalytic triad. Metabolic engineering techniques have been used to create organisms that can use formamide as sole nitrogen source and hence manufacture useful organic amines from it.

This enzyme is a hydrolase, one acting on carbon-nitrogen bonds other than peptide bonds, specifically in linear amides. The systematic name of this enzyme class is formamide amidohydrolase.

== Structural studies ==
As of late 2007, four structures have been solved for this class of enzymes, with PDB accession codes PDB: 2DYU, PDB: 2DYV, PDB: 2E2K, and PDB: 2E2L.
