= Precision breeding =

Precision breeding is a modern biotechnology process used to make targeted, specific changes to an organism's own DNA to produce beneficial traits that could also occur through traditional breeding or natural processes. Precision breeding includes gene editing and commonly uses tools like CRISPR to make specific targeted genetic changes.

== United Kingdom ==
The UK's Genetic Technology (Precision Breeding) Act 2023 received Royal Assent in March 2023, followed by the Genetic Technology (Precision Breeding) Regulations 2025 coming into effect on November 13, 2025. The initial implementation focuses strictly on plants; rules for precision-bred animals are deferred pending further animal welfare safeguards. In April 2026 the Animal Welfare Committee (AWC) published a report on breeding and breeding technologies in commercial livestock agriculture which recognised that while gene editing and genomic tools could improve disease resistance it must not be used to justify poor management or intensive systems.

The current process in the UK involves a research organisation applying to Department for Environment, Food & Rural Affairs (DEFRA) for a Precision Breeding Release Notice to test a precision-bred plant in research trials. If successful, the crop can then receive a Precision Breeding Marketing Notice, which is required before selling or making the plant commercially, however if the crop is intended for human consumption or as livestock feed it must first be evaluated by the Food Standards Agency (FSA).

Rothamsted tested CRISPR-edited Camelina plants in a trial began just before a European Court of Justice ruling reclassified gene-edited crops under strict GMO regulations. Camelina Sativa (an oilseed crop) at Rothamsted was modified to increase the size and yield, which could then translate into other varieties like Oil Seed Rape.

The first Precision Breeding Release Notice was issued for Low asparagine / low acrylamide wheat at Rothamsted, as asparagine converts into carcinogenic acrylamide during high heat processes like roasting and toasting, and so asparagine levels are strictly controlled by industry. This gained its Precision breeding marketing notice in July 2026 and is now being evaluated by the FSA.

The first Precision Breeding Marketing Notice was issued in May 2026 to Rothamsted for Barley with an increased lipid content, for use as a high-energy forage crop for ruminant livestock to improve feed efficiency and reduce emissions.

The first human trial in the UK of precision bred food was the ViTaL-D Study in Sept 2025 conducted by John Innes Centre and Quadram Institute, where tomatoes were edited to have high levels of vitamin D and involved 76 study participants.

== European Union ==
The European Union approved a landmark regulation on New Genomic Techniques (NGTs) on June 17, 2026, establishing a simplified, faster approval process for certain gene-edited plants, being the first step towards enabling collaboration and trade in precision bred plants across Europe.

== Japan ==
In 2019, Japan approved a regulatory policy that exempts gene-edited foods from mandatory safety assessments and GMO labeling, provided the final product contains no foreign DNA and approved the world's first gene-edited high-GABA tomato in 2021.
