= Pentanamidase =

Class of enzymes

Identifiers
- EC no.: 3.5.1.50
- CAS no.: 81032-50-0

Databases
- BRENDA: enzyme data
- ExPASy: NiceZyme view
- KEGG: enzyme entry
- MetaCyc: metabolic pathway
- Rhea: reactions
- PDB structures: RCSB PDB PDBe PDBsum
- Gene Ontology: AmiGO / QuickGO
Search
- PMC: articles
- PubMed: articles
- NCBI: proteins

Pentanamidase (EC 3.5.1.50) is an enzyme characterised from Alcaligenes eutrophus which catalyzes a hydrolysis reaction converting valeramide (pentanamide) to valeric acid and ammonia:

CH_{3}(CH_{2})_{3}CONH_{2}
H_{2}O
NH_{3}
CH_{3}(CH_{2})_{3}COOH

This enzyme is a hydrolase, one acting on carbon-nitrogen bonds other than peptide bonds, specifically in linear amides. The systematic name of this enzyme class is pentanamide amidohydrolase. This enzyme is also called valeramidase.
