= Poly(3-hydroxybutyrate) depolymerase =

poly(3-hydroxybutyrate) depolymerase

Identifiers
- EC no.: 3.1.1.75

Databases
- IntEnz: IntEnz view
- BRENDA: BRENDA entry
- ExPASy: NiceZyme view
- KEGG: KEGG entry
- MetaCyc: metabolic pathway
- PRIAM: profile
- PDB structures: RCSB PDB PDBe PDBsum
- Gene Ontology: AmiGO / QuickGO
Search
- PMC: articles
- PubMed: articles
- NCBI: proteins

Poly(3-hydroxybutyrate) depolymerase (EC 3.1.1.75, PHB depolymerase, systematic name poly[(R)-3-hydroxybutanoate] hydrolase) is an enzyme used in the degradation processes of a natural polyester poly(3-hydroxyburate). This enzyme has growing commercialization interests due to it implications in biodegradable plastic decomposition.It catalyzes the reaction

[(R)-3-hydroxybutanoate]_{n} + H2O = [(R)-3-hydroxybutanoate]_{n-x} + [(R)-3-hydroxybutanoate]_{x}; x = 1–5

Other names in common use include PHB depolymerase, poly(3HB) depolymerase, poly[(R)-hydroxyalkanoic acid] depolymerase, poly(HA) depolymerase, poly(HASCL) depolymerase, and poly[(R)-3-hydroxybutyrate] hydrolase.

== Function ==
This enzyme is used in a multitude of bacteria and microbes and anaerobic and aerobic environments. Species such as Pseudomonas lemoigne, Comamonas sp. Acidovorax faecalis, Aspergillus fumigatus and Variovorax paradoxus have been found in soil, Alcaligenes faecalis, Pseudomonas, Illyobacter delafieldi, have been found in aerobic sludge, and finally, Comamonas testosterone, Pseudomonas stutzeri, are found in seawater and lakewater.

Among the most studied, Alcaligenes faecalis, uses this depolymerase to metabolize poly(3-hydroxybutyrate), breaking it down for its stores of carbon. The metabolization of poly(3-hydroxybutyrate) allows for high growth rates in these organisms when the bioavailability of carbon in the environment is low. Some of these microbes such as Alcaligenes faecalis AE122, can utilize this reaction to attain its sole source of carbon.

As many studies focus on extracellular poly(3-hydroxybutyrate) depolymerase, there are both an intracellular and extracellular PHB depolymerase. Extracellular depolymerases are able to degrade upon partially denatured PHB molecules, whereas intracellular depolymerases act upon the native PHB molecule.

== Structure and Active Site ==
As of late 2007, two structures have been solved for this class of enzymes, with PDB accession codes 2D80 and 2D81.

The shape of poly(3-hydroxybutyrate) depolymerase is globular, consisting of a single domain, and is a circularly permuted variation of the α-β hydrolase fold.

The amino acid residues of Ser39, Asp121, and His155, are found after the first (β1), third (β3), and fourth (β4) β-strands of the depolymerase. The substrate binding site has at least 3 subsites in which monomer units of polyester substrates can bind. Thirteen hydrophobic residues are aligned and exposed to solvent along the surface of the depolymerase and potentially allow for sufficient binding affinity without a distinct substrate-binding domain, this domain serves as the polymer-absorption site.

The degradation of poly(3-hydroxyburate) is caused by splintering of the crystalline structure through surface erosion, thus allowing for an edge attack from the enzyme to hydrolyze the molecule into its products. In a study on the degradation of single crystals of PHB it was found that PHB depolymerase, preferentially degrades the crystalline edges rather than the chain folds of the PHB molecule.
