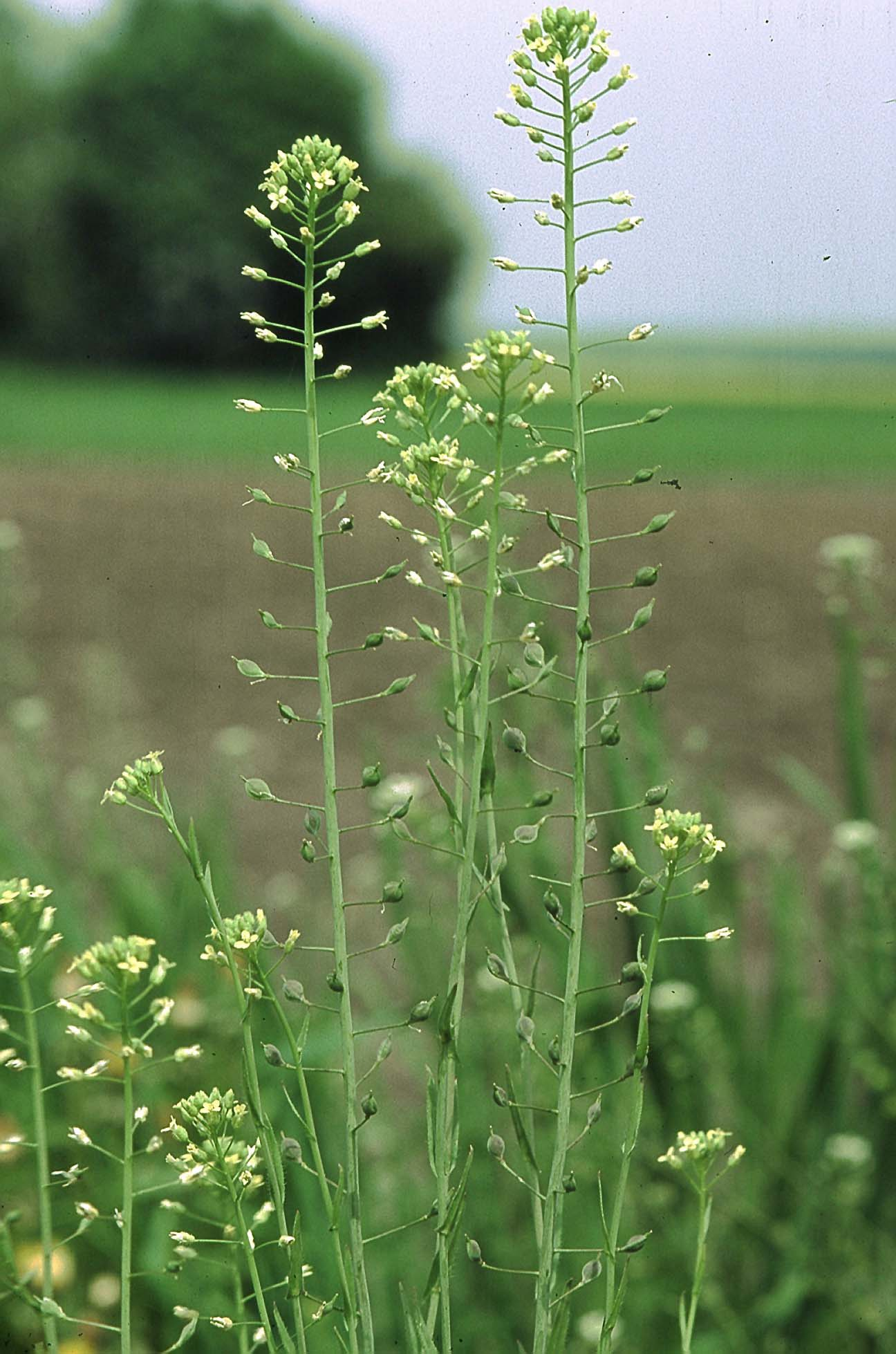

Scientific classification
- Kingdom: Plantae
- Clade: Tracheophytes
- Clade: Angiosperms
- Clade: Eudicots
- Clade: Rosids
- Order: Brassicales
- Family: Brassicaceae
- Genus: Camelina
- Species: C. sativa

Binomial name
- Camelina sativa (L.) Crantz

Synonyms
- Adyseton dentatum G.Don; Alyssum dentatum Willd.; Alyssum myagrum Wibel; Alyssum sativum (L.) Scop.; Camelina ambigua Besser ex Steud.; Camelina caucasica (Sinskaya) Vassilcz.; Camelina glabrata (DC.) Fritsch; Camelina hirsuta Bernh.; Camelina pilosa (DC.) N.W.Zinger; Camelina sagittata Moench; Camelina sativa subsp. zingeri (Mirek) Smejkal; Camelina sativa var. zingeri Mirek; Chamaelinum sativum Host; Cochlearia sativa Cav.; Crucifera camelina E.H.L.Krause; Dorella oleifera Bubani; Linostrophum sativum Schrank; Moenchia arvensis Bernh. ex Hoffm.; Moenchia sativa Roth; Myagrum sativum L.; Thlaspi camelina Crantz

= Camelina sativa =

Species of flowering plant

Camelina sativa is a flowering plant in the family Brassicaceae usually known as camelina, gold-of-pleasure, or false flax, but also occasionally as wild flax, linseed dodder, German sesame, or Siberian oilseed. It is native to Europe and areas of Central Asia, but is cultivated as an oilseed crop mainly in Europe and in North America. It is not related to true flax, which is in the family Linaceae.

== Description ==
As a summer or winter annual plant, camelina grows to heights of 30–120 cm (12–47 in), with branching stems which become woody at maturity. The leaves are alternate on the stem, and lanceolate with a length from 2–8 cm (0.79–3.15 in) and a width of 2–10 mm (0.079–0.394 in). Leaves and stems may be partially hairy. In the UK, it blooms between June and July. Its abundant, four-petaled flowers are pale yellow in colour and cross-shaped. Later, it produces a fruit which is pear-shaped with a short beak. The seeds are brown or orange in colour and a length of 2–3 mm (0.079–0.118 in). The 1,000-seed weight ranges from 0.8–2.0 g (0.028–0.071 oz).

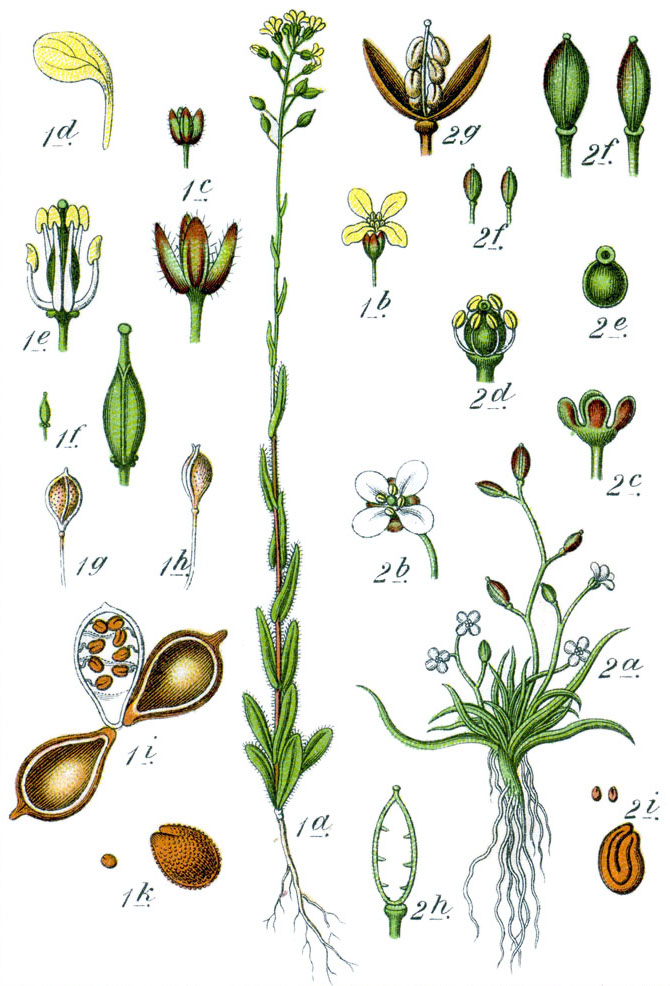
Illustration of C. sativa (1) and Subularia aquatica (2) from Deutschlands Flora in Abbildungen

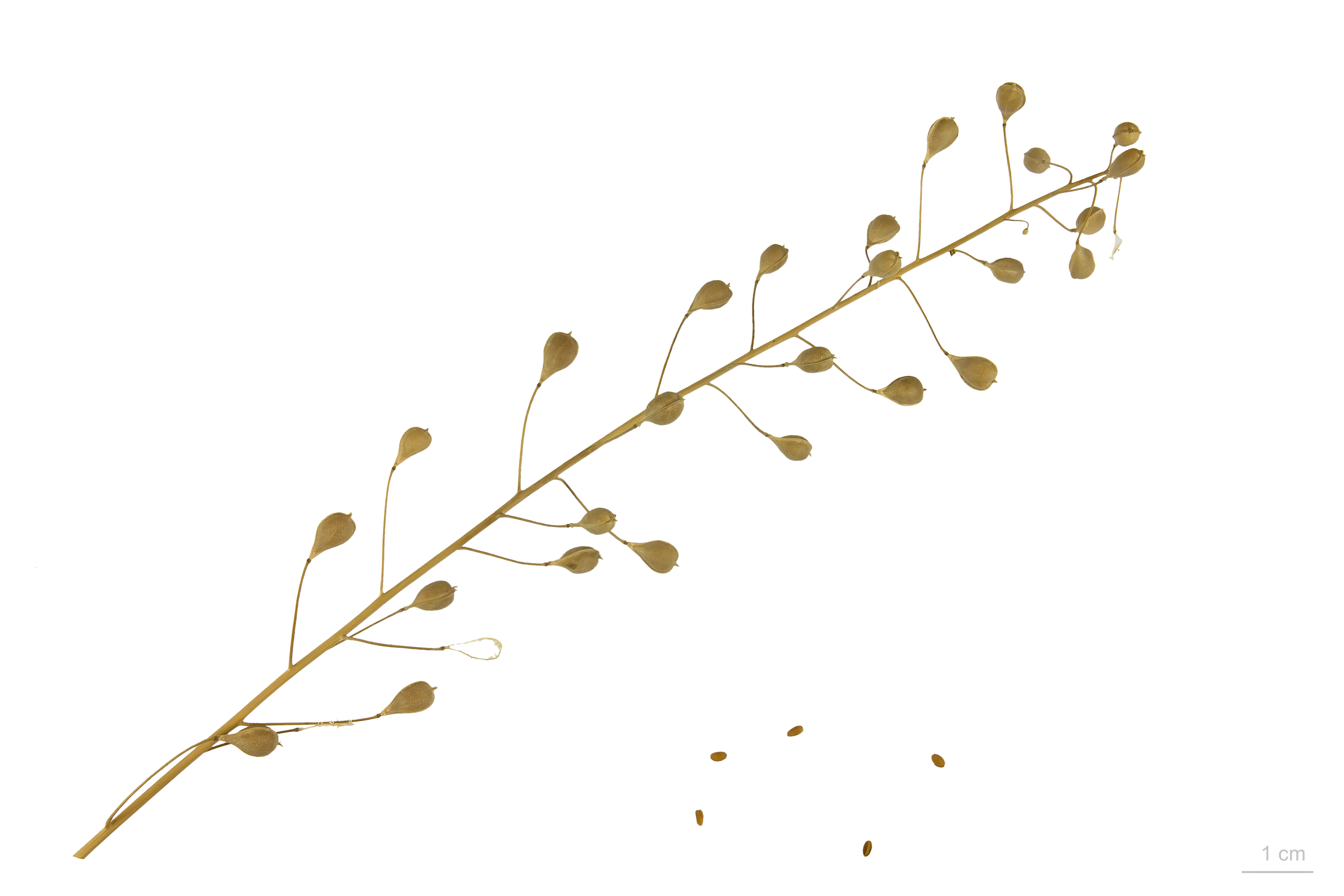
Camelina sativa museum specimen

== Distribution ==
Today, camelina is found wild or cultivated in almost all regions of Europe, Asia, and North America, but also in South America, Australia, and New Zealand. Camelina seems to be particularly adapted to cold semiarid climate zone (steppes and prairies).

== History ==
C. sativa has been traditionally cultivated as an oilseed crop to produce vegetable oil and animal feed. Ample archeological evidence shows it has been grown in Europe for at least 3,000 years. The earliest archaeologic sites where it was found include the Neolithic levels at Auvernier, Switzerland (dated to the second millennium BC), the Chalcolithic level at Pefkakia in Greece (dated to the third millennium BC), and Sucidava-Celei, Romania (circa 2200 BC). During the Bronze Age and Iron Age, it was an important agricultural crop in northern Greece beyond the current range of the olive. It apparently continued to be grown at the time of the Roman Empire, although its Greek and Latin names are not known. As early as 600 BC, it was being sown as a monoculture around the Rhine River Valley, and was thought to have spread mainly by coexisting as a weed with flax monocultures.

Until the 1940s, camelina was an important oil crop in eastern and central Europe, and it is still cultivated in a few parts of Europe for its seed oil. Camelina oil was used in oil lamps (until the modern harnessing of natural gas, propane, and electricity) and as an edible oil (camelina oil, also referred to as wild flax or false flax oil). It was possibly brought to North America unintentionally as a weed with flaxseed, and has had limited commercial importance until modern times. Currently, the breeding potential is unexplored compared to other oilseeds commercially grown around the world.

== Uses ==
The seed oil was used in the kitchen or burnt in lamps.

=== Human food ===
The crop is now being researched due to its exceptionally high level (up to 45%) of omega-3 fatty acids, which is uncommon in vegetable sources. Seeds contain 38 to 43% oil and 27 to 32% protein. Over 50% of the fatty acids in cold-pressed camelina oil are polyunsaturated. The oil is also very rich in natural antioxidants, such as tocopherols, making this highly stable oil very resistant to oxidation and rancidity. It has 1–3% erucic acid; recently, several low-erucic and zero-erucic Camelina sativa varieties (with erucic acid content of less than 1%) have been introduced. The vitamin E content of camelina oil is approximately 110 mg/100 g. It is well suited for use as a cooking oil as it has an almond-like flavor and aroma.

Typical fatty acid content of camelina, canola, flax and sunflower oils in %.
	16:0	18:0	18:1	18:2 (omega-6)	18:3 (omega-3)	20:0	20:1	22:1
Camelina	7.8	3.0	16.8	23.0	31.2	0	12.0	2.8
Canola	6.2	0	61.3	21.6	6.6	0	0	0
Flax	5.3	3.1	16.2	14.7	59.6	0	0	0.9
Sunflower	6.0	4.0	16.5	72.4	0	0	0	0

=== Traditional speciality guaranteed ===
The oil is registered under the name "Olej rydzowy tradycyjny" ("traditional Camelina oil" in Polish) as a traditional speciality guaranteed product in the European Union and the United Kingdom.

=== Biodiesel and jet fuel ===
The US state of Montana has recently been growing more camelina for its potential as a biofuel and biolubricant. Plant scientists at the University of Idaho, Washington State University, and other institutions also are studying this emerging biodiesel.

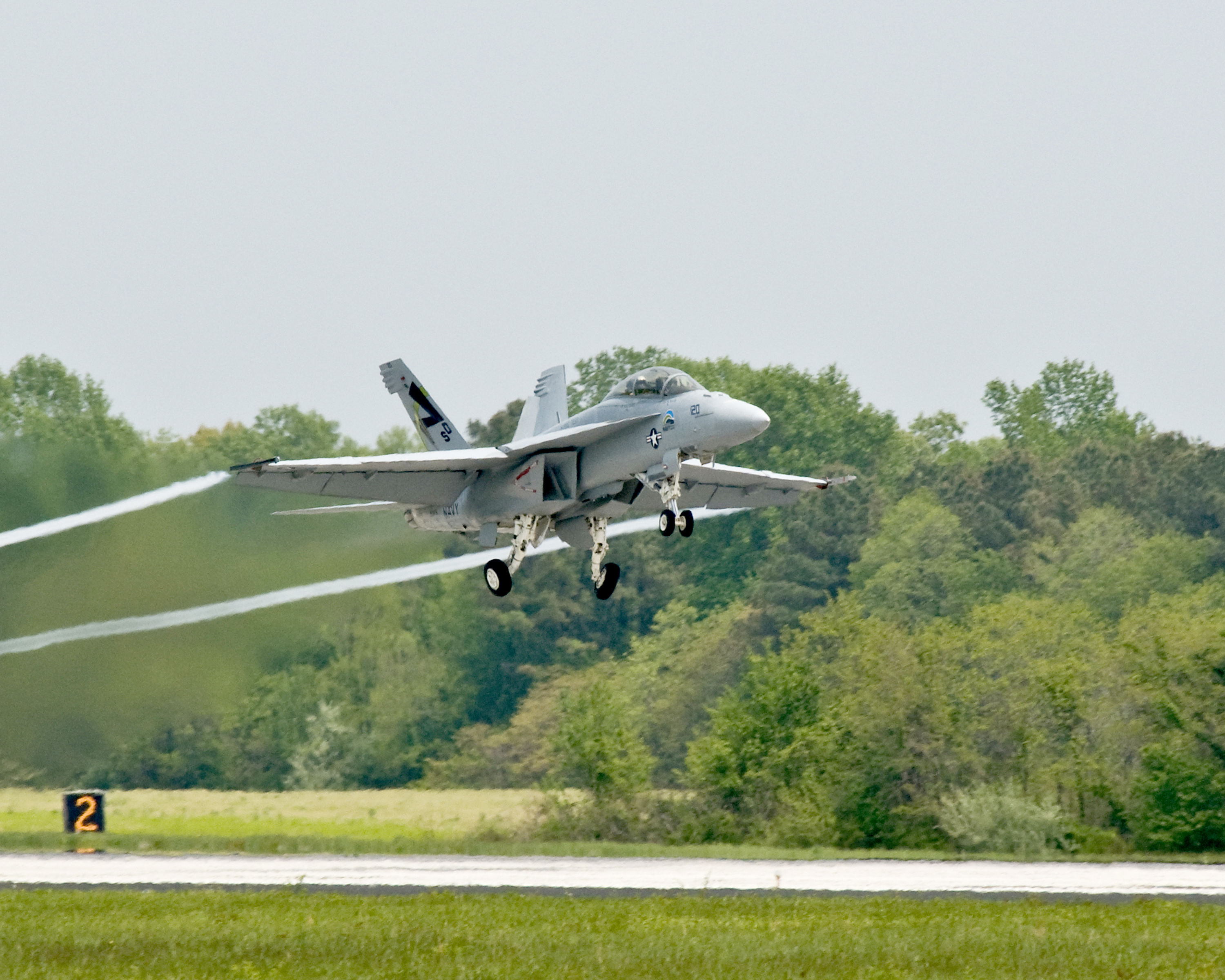
A U.S. Navy F/A-18 Super Hornet ("Green Hornet") flying at Naval Air Station Patuxent River using fuel made partly from C. sativa (2010)

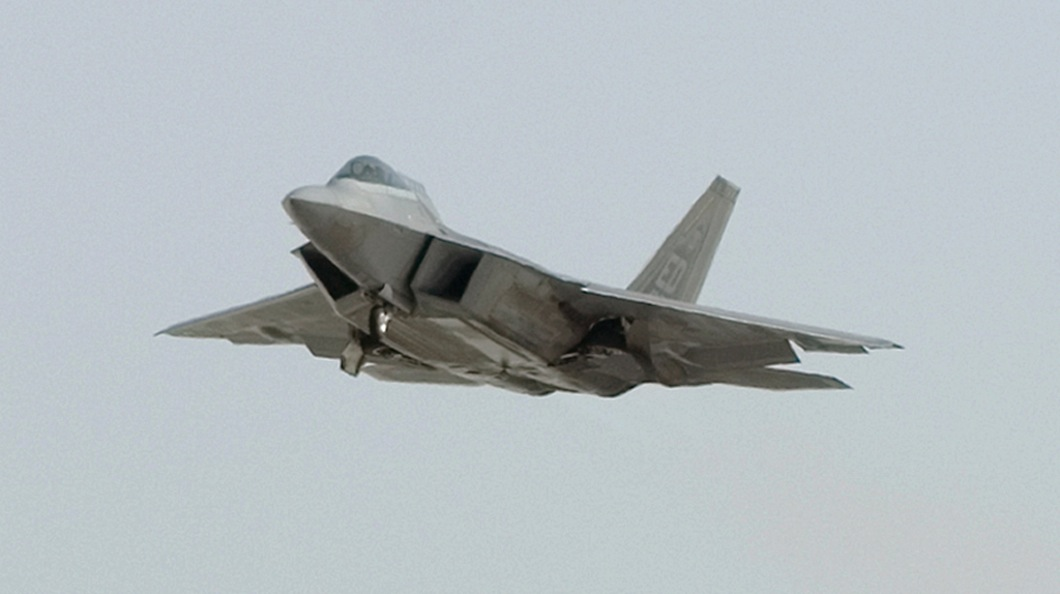
A U.S. Air Force F-22 Raptor over Edwards Air Force Base fueled by a 50/50 blend of JP-8 jet fuel and biofuel made from C. sativa (2011)

Studies have shown camelina-based jet fuel reduces net carbon emissions by about 80%. The United States Navy chose it as the feedstock for their first test of aviation biofuel, and successfully operated a static F414 engine (used in the F/A-18 Hornet and F/A-18E/F Super Hornet) in October 2009 at Naval Air Station Patuxent River, Maryland. The United States Air Force also began testing the fuel in its aircraft in March 2010. On 22 April 2010, the U.S. Navy observed Earth Day by conducting a flight test lasting about 45 minutes at Naval Air Station Patuxent River of an F/A-18 Super Hornet – nicknamed the "Green Hornet" – powered by a 50/50 blend of conventional jet fuel and a biofuel made from camelina; the flight was the first of a planned 15 test flights totaling about 23 flight-hours, scheduled for completion by mid-June 2010. In March 2011, the U.S. Air Force successfully tested a 50/50 mix of jet propellant 8 (JP-8) and camelina-derived biofuel in an F-22 Raptor, achieving a speed of Mach 1.5 on 18 March 2011. On 4 September 2011, the U.S. Navy's Blue Angels flight demonstration squadron used a 50/50 blend of camelina biofuel and jet fuel at the Naval Air Station Patuxent River Air Expo, the first time an entire military aviation unit flew on a biofuel mix. In 2011, the U.S. Navy announced plans to deploy a "Great Green Fleet," a carrier battle group powered entirely by nonfossil fuels, by 2016.

Continental Airlines, was the first commercial airline to test a 50:50 blend of bio-derived "green jet" fuel and traditional jet fuel in the first demonstration of the use of sustainable biofuel to power a commercial aircraft in North America.( January 2009). The demonstration flight, conducted in partnership with Boeing, GE Aviation/CFM International, and Honeywell's UOP, marked the first sustainable biofuel demonstration flight by a commercial carrier using a two-engine aircraft: a Boeing 737-800 equipped with CFM International CFM56-7B engines. Continental ran the blend in Engine No. 2. During the two-hour test flight, Continental pilots engaged the aircraft in a number of normal and non-normal flight maneuvers, such as mid-flight engine shutdown and restart, and power accelerations and decelerations. A Continental engineer recorded flight data on board. KLM, the Royal Dutch Airline, was the first airline to operate a passenger-carrying flight using biofuel. On 23 November 2009, a Boeing 747 flew, carrying a limited number of passengers, with one of its four engines running on a 50/50 mix of biofuel and kerosene.

In June 2011, a Gulfstream G450 became the first business jet to cross the Atlantic Ocean using a blend of 50/50 biofuel developed by Honeywell derived from camelina and petroleum-based jet fuel. The Dutch biofarming company Waterland International and a Japanese federation of farmers made an agreement in March 2012 to plant and grow camelina on 2000 to 3000 ha in Fukushima Prefecture. The seeds were to be used to produce biofuel, that could be used to produce electricity. According to director William Nolten, the region had a big potential for the production of clean energy. Some 800.000 ha in the region could not be used to produce food anymore, and after the nuclear disaster because of fears for contamination, the Japanese people refused to buy food produced in the region, anyway. Experiments would be done to find out whether camelina was capable of extracting radioactive caesium from the soil. An experiment with sunflowers had no success.

A partnership of Chevron and Bunge companies purchased an Argentina camelina sativa seed producer, Chacraservicios, in July 2023 to contribute to their bio-diesel production.

=== Animal feed ===
Camelina has been approved as a cattle feed supplement in the US, as well as an ingredient (up to 10% of the ration) in broiler chicken feed and laying hen feed. Camelina meal, the byproduct of camelina when the oil has been extracted, has a significant crude protein content. "Feeding camelina meal significantly increased (p < 0.01) omega-3 [fatty acid] concentration in both breast and thigh meat [of turkeys] compared to control group." Medical research indicates a diet abundant in omega-3 fatty acids is beneficial to human health. Camelina oil has also been investigated as a sustainable lipid source to fully replace fish oil in diets for farmed Atlantic salmon, rainbow trout, and Atlantic cod. However, various antinutritional factors are present in camelina oil meal and can affect its use as livestock feed. The use of camelina meal for animal feed is only limited by the presence of glucosinolates.

The Canadian Food Inspection Agency has approved feeding cold-pressed non-solvent extracted Camelina meal to broiler chickens at up to 12% inclusion.

=== Use in Canada ===
Approximately 50,000 acres are currently cultivated in Canada. The Camelina Association of Canada estimates that 1 to 3 million acres could be planted in the future. Several factors challenge the spread of camelina cultivation in Canada: it does not have government crop classification, and camelina meal is not approved as livestock feed. In early 2010, Health Canada approved camelina oil as a food in Canada.

In 2014, camelina was included for the first time in Canada's Advance Payments Program (APP), commonly known as the cash advance program.

== Genetics ==
The first full genome sequence for Camelina sativa was released on 1 August 2013 by a Canadian research team. The genome sequence and its annotation are available in a genome viewer format and enabled for sequence searching and alignment. Technical details of Camelina's genome sequence were published on 23 April 2014 in the academic journal Nature Communications.

In 2013, Rothamsted Research in the UK reported they had developed a genetically modified form of Camelina sativa that produced eicosapentaenoic acid (EPA) and docosahexaenoic acid (DHA) at levels equivalent to fish oil. EPA and DHA are long-chain omega-3 fatty acids which are beneficial for cardiovascular health. The main source of these omega-3 fatty acids is fish but supplies are limited and unsustainable. In October 2023, Yield10 Bioscience acquired an exclusive commercial license for the Rothansted's EPA/DHA Camelina. In January 2024, Yield10 requested a Regulatory Status Review from USDA-APHIS for the modified Camelina.

== Agronomics ==
=== Cultivation ===
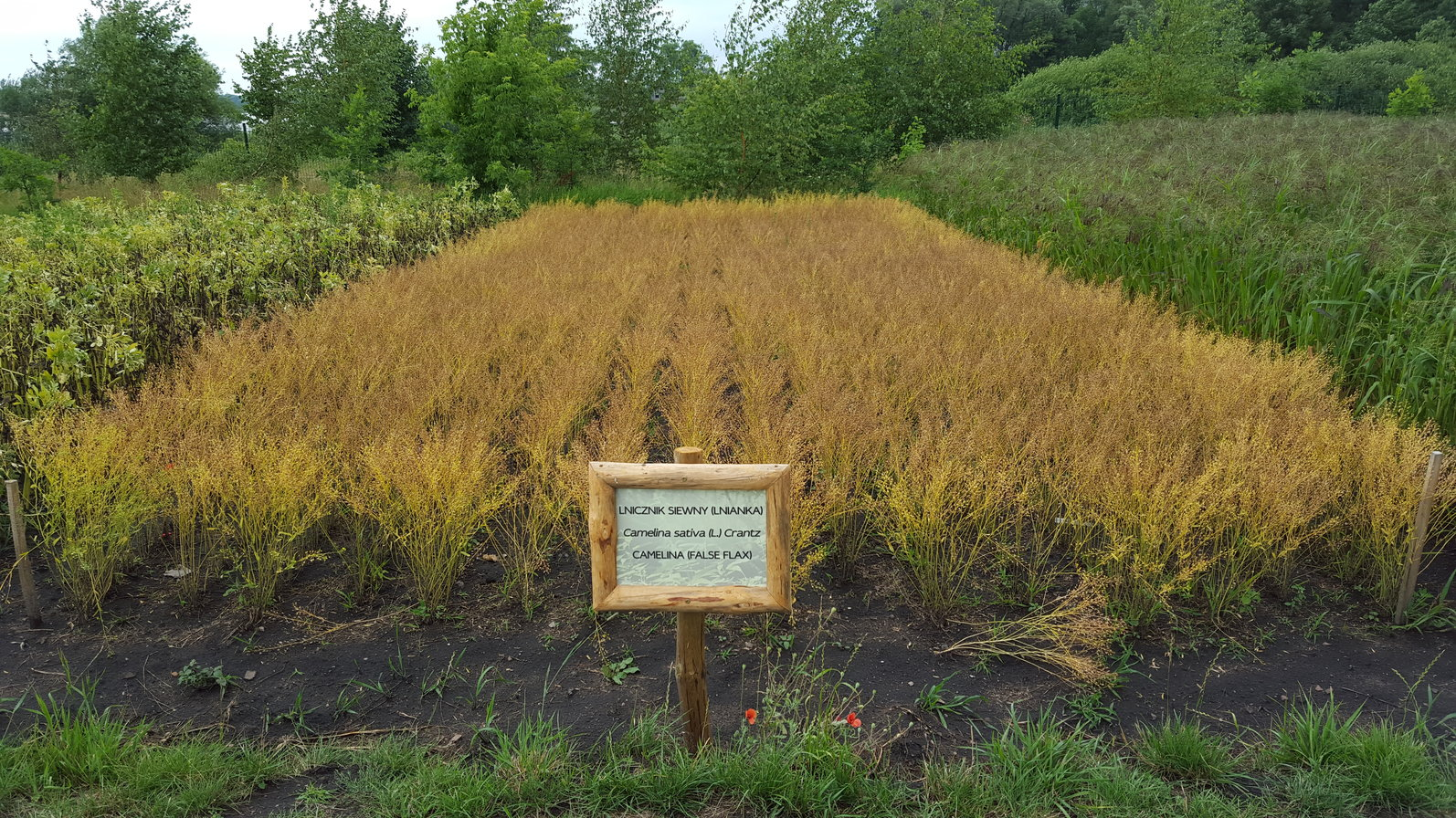
A showcase field of Camelina sativa in Biskupin, Poland

Camelina is a short-season crop (85–100 days) and grows well in the temperate climate zone in light or medium soils. Camelina is generally seeded in spring from March to May, but can also be seeded in fall in mild climates.

A seeding rate of 3–4 kg/ha is recommended, with an row interval of 12 to 20 cm. Seeding depth should not exceed 1 cm. With high seeding rates, these independently noncompetitive seedlings become competitive against weeds because of their density. The seedlings are early emerging and can withstand mild frosts in the spring. Minimal seedbed preparation is needed to establish camelina.

Usually, camelina does not need any field interventions. However, perennial weeds may be difficult to control. Some specialized oilseed herbicides can be used on it. Also, camelina is highly resistant to black leg and Alternaria brassicae, but it can be susceptible to sclerotinia stem rot. No insect has been found to cause economic damage to camelina. Camelina needs little water or nitrogen to flourish; it can be grown on marginal agricultural lands. Fertilization requirements depend on soils, but are generally low. It may be used as a rotation crop for wheat and other cereals, to increase the health of the soil. Camelina can also show some allelopathic traits, and it can be grown in mixed crop with cereals or legumes.

Camelina is harvested and seeded with conventional farming equipment, which makes adding it to a crop rotation relatively easy for farmers who do not already grow it.

Seed yields vary depending on conditions and can reach 2700 kg/ha (2400 lb/acre).

=== Cultivars ===
- North America: 'Blaine Creek', 'Suneson', 'Platte', 'Cheyenne', 'SO-40', 'SO-50', 'SO-60'
- Europe: 'Epona', 'Celine', 'Calena', 'Lindo', 'Madonna', 'Konto','D.Tagliafierro'

=== Weed potential ===
C. sativa subsp. linicola is a serious weed in flax fields. In fact, attempts to separate its seed from flax seeds with a winnowing machine over the years have selected for seeds which are similar in size to flax seeds, an example of Vavilovian mimicry.

== See also ==
- Aviation biofuel
- Essential fatty acid
