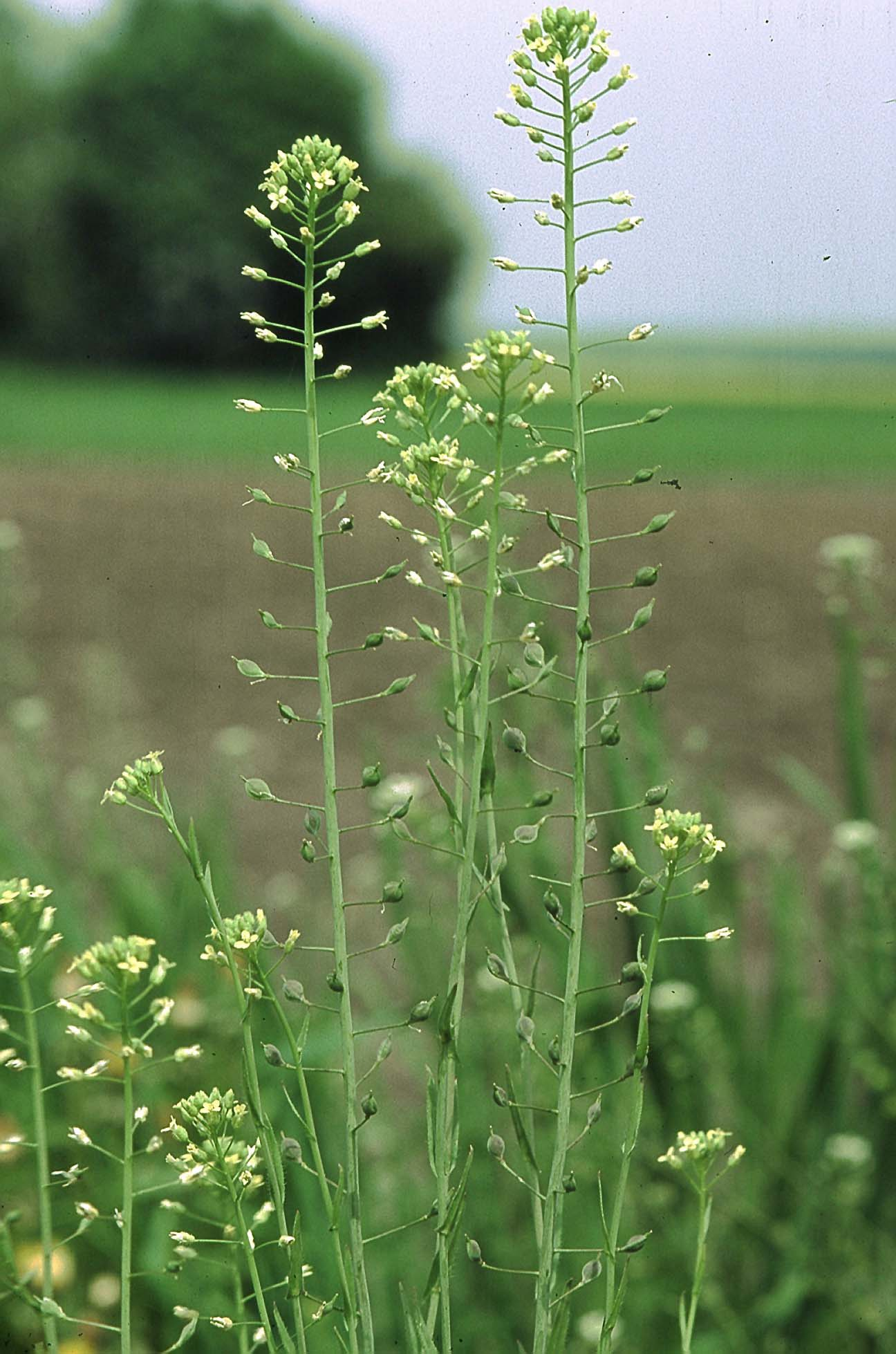
- Camelina sativa

Scientific classification
- Kingdom: Plantae
- Clade: Tracheophytes
- Clade: Angiosperms
- Clade: Eudicots
- Clade: Rosids
- Order: Brassicales
- Family: Brassicaceae
- Genus: Camelina; Crantz

Species
- 8; see text

Synonyms
- Chamaelinum Host; Dorella Bubani; Linostrophum Schrank; Sinistrophorum Schrank ex Endl.

= Camelina =

Genus of flowering plants in the cabbage family

Camelina is a genus within the flowering plant family Brassicaceae. The Camelina species, commonly known as false flax, are native to Mediterranean regions of Europe and Asia. Most species of this genus have been little studied, with the exception of Camelina sativa, historically cultivated as an oil plant. Heinrich Johann Nepomuk von Crantz was the first botanist to use the genus Camelina in his classification works in 1762.

As a way to reduce fossil fuel emissions, the US Navy tested a 50-50 mix of jet aviation fuel and biofuel derived from camelina seeds in 2010. A study published in December 2016 explained that the current low price of conventional kerosene-based jet fuel makes it cost-prohibitive for commercial airlines to use camelina-based jet fuel. The study said substantial government intervention would be one way to create a market for camelina, by combining 9 percent government subsidy on camelina crop production, with 9 percent tax on conventional fuel.

== Etymology ==
The name Camelina comes from the Greek for "ground" and "flax", alluding to its being a weed which suppresses the vigour of flax crops.

== Description ==
Camelina plants are annual or biennial herbs. Their leaves are simple, lanceolate to narrowly elliptic. The flowers are hermaphroditic actinomorphic, grouped in racemes, and yellowish colored. The seeds are formed in dehiscent siliques.

== Genetics ==
The first full genome sequence for Camelina sativa was released on 1 August 2013 by a Canadian research team. The genome sequence and its annotation are available in a genome viewer format and enabled for sequence searching and alignment. Technical details of Camelina's genome sequence were published on 23 April 2014 in the academic journal Nature Communications.

In 2013, Rothamsted Research in the UK reported they had developed a genetically modified form of Camelina sativa that produced eicosapentaenoic acid (EPA) and docosahexaenoic acid (DHA) at levels equivalent to fish oil. EPA and DHA are long-chain omega-3 fatty acids which are beneficial for cardiovascular health. The main source of these omega-3 fatty acids is fish but supplies are limited and unsustainable. In October 2023, Yield10 Bioscience acquired an exclusive commercial license for the Rothansted's EPA/DHA Camelina. In January 2024, Yield10 requested a Regulatory Status Review from USDA-APHIS for the modified Camelina.

== Species ==
Eight species are accepted.

- Camelina alyssum (Mill.) Thell.
- Camelina anomala Boiss. & Hausskn.
- Camelina hispida Boiss.
- Camelina laxa C.A.Mey.
- Camelina microcarpa Andrz. ex DC.
- Camelina neglecta J.R.Brock, Mandáková, Lysak & Al-Shehbaz
- Camelina rumelica Velen.
- Camelina sativa (L.) Crantz

== Biodiesel ==
Biodiesel made from camelina has a variety of benefits. First, traditional petroleum or diesel fuel is not renewable resources, the production of these resources is finite. Camelina biodiesel, however, is a renewable resource. Camelina-based aviation fuel could save 84% of carbon emissions. Camelina biodiesel can be produced in large quantities as feedstocks are enough. Moreover, camelina biodiesel can reduce a country's dependence on fossil resources, which can ensure a country's energy security. In addition, camelina biodiesel is an environmentally friendly fuel, and it is biodegradable. The greenhouse gas emission of camelina biodiesel produced by no-till farming is lower than that of traditional methods.
