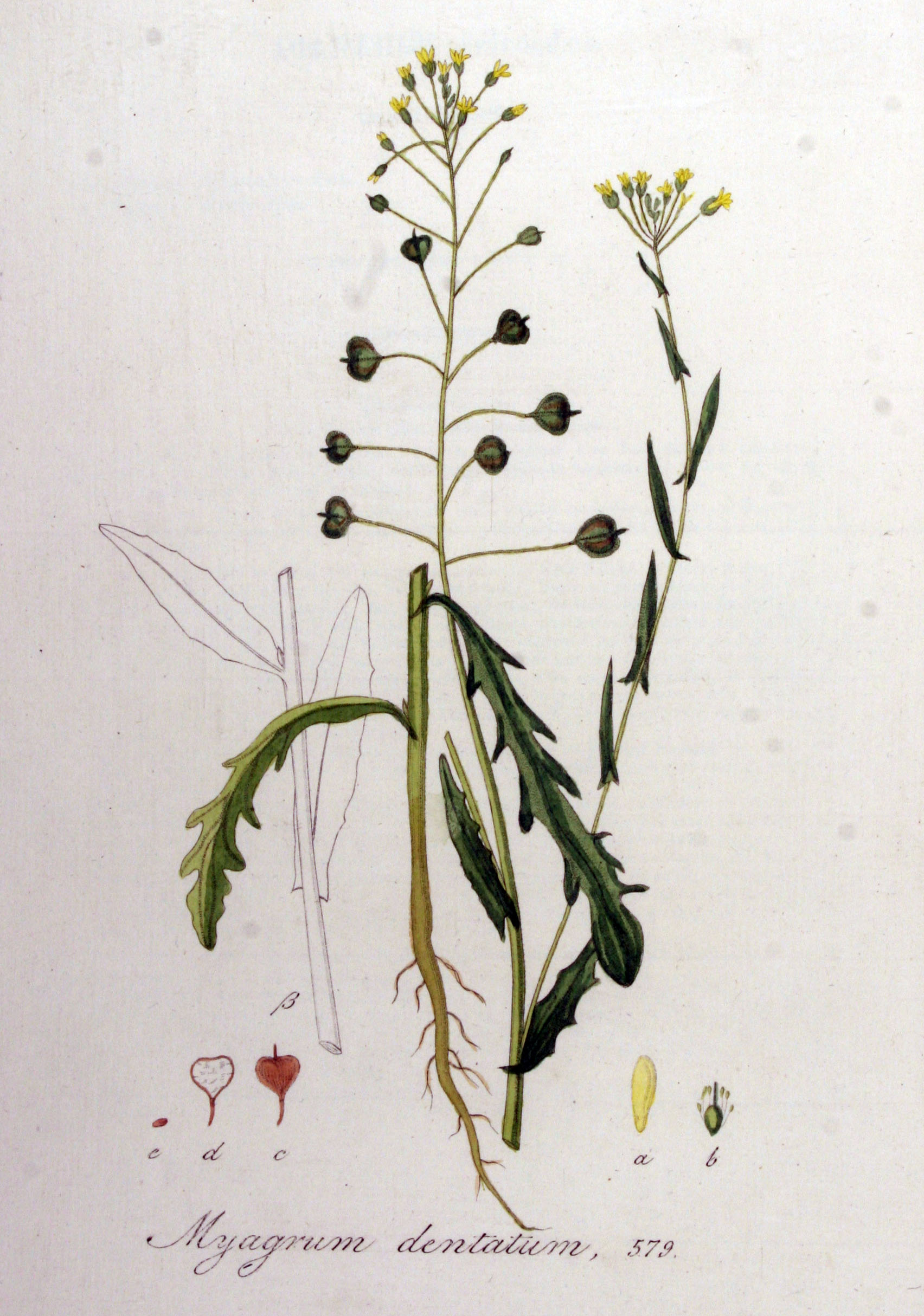

Scientific classification
- Kingdom: Plantae
- Clade: Tracheophytes
- Clade: Angiosperms
- Clade: Eudicots
- Clade: Rosids
- Order: Brassicales
- Family: Brassicaceae
- Genus: Camelina
- Species: C. alyssum

Binomial name
- Camelina alyssum (Mill.) Thell.

Subspecies
- Camelina alyssum subsp. alyssum; Camelina alyssum subsp. integerrima (Čelak.) Smejkal

Synonyms
- Camelina sativa subsp. alyssum (Mill.) Hegi & Em.Schmid (1919); Myagrum alyssum Mill. (1786)

= Camelina alyssum =

Species of flowering plant

Camelina alyssum is a species of flowering plant belonging to the family Brassicaceae. Its native range is Europe to Caucasus.

== Description ==
Camelina alyssum is an annual or biennial plant. They commonly grow from 20 to 70 centimeters tall, but occasionally will reach one meter in height. The stems may be unbranched or only branched at the ends and are smooth in texture or only have fine downy hairs at the base of the stems. At the time they flower the leaves at the base of the plant (basal leaves) are usually withered. The leaves on the stems are variable in shape and may have an outline like a narrow spear head (blade lanceolate leaves), have a long rectangular shape (narrowly oblong leaves), or narrow like a blade grass with only a slight spear-point shape (linear-lanceolate). The leaves will have lobes that reach less than halfway to the midrib (pinnatifid leaves) or have a circular wavy edge (sinuate-dentate). The leaves may be anywhere from 1.5 to 10 centimeters long, but usually are 2.5–7 centimeters long. They are quite narrow, most often just 2–10 millimeters wide, but might reach 20 millimeters.
