= Poly(3-hydroxyoctanoate) depolymerase =

poly(3-hydroxyoctanoate) depolymerase

Identifiers
- EC no.: 3.1.1.76

Databases
- IntEnz: IntEnz view
- BRENDA: BRENDA entry
- ExPASy: NiceZyme view
- KEGG: KEGG entry
- MetaCyc: metabolic pathway
- PRIAM: profile
- PDB structures: RCSB PDB PDBe PDBsum
- Gene Ontology: AmiGO / QuickGO
Search
- PMC: articles
- PubMed: articles
- NCBI: proteins

The enzyme poly(3-hydroxyoctanoate) depolymerase (EC 3.1.1.76) catalyzes the hydrolysis of the polyester poly{oxycarbonyl[(R)-2-pentylethylene] to oligomers

This enzyme belongs to the family of hydrolases, specifically those acting on carboxylic ester bonds. The systematic name is poly{oxycarbonyl[(R)-2-pentylethylene]} hydrolase. Other names in common use include PHO depolymerase, poly(3HO) depolymerase, poly[(R)-hydroxyalkanoic acid] depolymerase, poly(HA) depolymerase, poly(HAMCL) depolymerase, and poly[(R)-3-hydroxyoctanoate] hydrolase.
