= Polyhydroxyalkanoates =

Polyester family

Structure of poly-(R)-3-hydroxybutyrate (P3HB), a polyhydroxyalkanoate

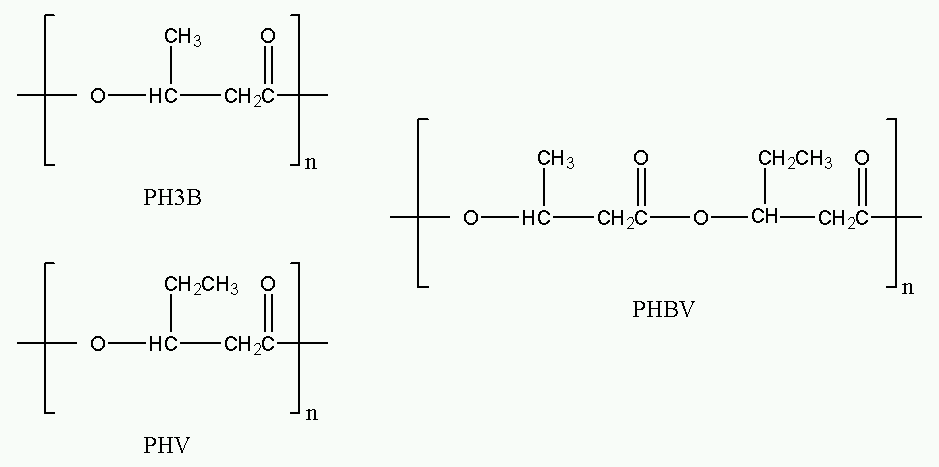
Chemical structures of P3HB, PHV and their copolymer PHBV

Polyhydroxyalkanoates or PHAs are polyesters produced in nature by numerous microorganisms, including through bacterial fermentation of sugars or lipids. When produced by bacteria they serve as both a source of energy and as a carbon store. More than 150 different monomers can be combined within this family to give materials with extremely different properties. These plastics are biodegradable and are used in the production of bioplastics.

They can be either thermoplastic or elastomeric materials, with melting points ranging from 40 to 180 °C.

The material properties and biocompatibility of PHA can also be changed by blending, modifying the surface or combining PHA with other polymers, enzymes and inorganic materials, expanding the range of applications.

== Biosynthesis ==
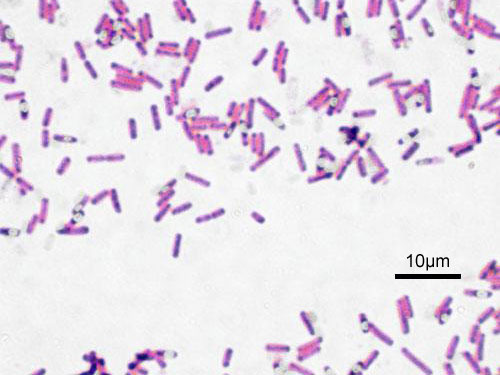
Certain strains of Bacillus subtilis bacteria can be used to produce polyhydroxyalkanoates

To induce PHA production in a laboratory setting, a culture of a microorganism, such as Cupriavidus necator, can be placed in a suitable medium and fed appropriate nutrients so that it multiplies rapidly. Once the population has reached a substantial level, the nutrient composition can be changed to force the microorganism to synthesize PHA. The yield of PHA obtained from the intracellular granule, a small vesicle in the cell for containing intracellular materials for later extretion, can be as high as 80% of the organism's dry weight.

The biosynthesis of PHA is usually caused by deficiency conditions (e.g. lack of macro elements such as phosphorus, nitrogen, trace elements, or lack of oxygen) and the excess supply of carbon sources. However, the prevalence of PHA production within either a monoculture or a set of mixed-microbial organisms can also be dependent on overall nutrient limitation, not just macro elements. This is especially the case in the 'feast/famine' cycle method for induction of PHA production, wherein carbon is periodically added and depleted to cause famine, which encourages cells to produce PHA during 'feast' as a storage method for periods of famine.

Polyesters are deposited in the form of highly refractive granules in the cells. Depending upon the microorganism and the cultivation conditions, homo- or copolyesters with different hydroxyalkanoic acids are generated. PHA granules are then recovered by disrupting the cells. Recombinant Bacillus subtilis str. pBE2C1 and Bacillus subtilis str. pBE2C1AB were used in production of polyhydroxyalkanoates (PHA) and it was shown that they could use malt waste as carbon source for lower cost of PHA production.

PHA synthases are the key enzymes of PHA biosynthesis. They use the coenzyme A - thioester of (r)-hydroxy fatty acids as substrates. The two classes of PHA synthases differ in the specific use of hydroxy fatty acids of short or medium chain length.

The resulting PHA is of the two types:

- Poly (HA SCL) from hydroxy fatty acids with short chain lengths including three to five carbon atoms are synthesized by numerous bacteria, including Cupriavidus necator and Alcaligenes latus (PHB).
- Poly (HA MCL) from hydroxy fatty acids with medium chain lengths including six to 14 carbon atoms, can be made for example, by Pseudomonas putida.

A few bacteria, including Aeromonas hydrophila and Thiococcus pfennigii, synthesize copolyester from the above two types of hydroxy fatty acids, or at least possess enzymes that are capable of part of this synthesis.

Another even larger scale synthesis can be done with the help of soil organisms. For lack of nitrogen and phosphorus they produce a kilogram of PHA per three kilograms of sugar.

The simplest and most commonly occurring form of PHA is the fermentative production of poly-beta-hydroxybutyrate [poly(3-hydroxybutyrate), P(3HB)], which consists of 1000 to 30000 hydroxy fatty acid monomers.

== Industrial production ==
In the industrial production of PHA, the polyester is extracted and purified from the bacteria by optimizing the conditions of microbial fermentation of sugar, glucose, or vegetable oil.

In the 1980s, Imperial Chemical Industries developed poly(3-hydroxybutyrate-co-3-hydroxyvalerate) obtained via fermentation that was named "Biopol". It was sold under the name "Biopol" and distributed in the U.S. by Monsanto and later Metabolix.

As raw material for the fermentation, carbohydrates such as glucose and sucrose can be used, but also vegetable oil or glycerine from biodiesel production. Researchers in industry are working on methods with which transgenic crops will be developed that express PHA synthesis routes from bacteria and so produce PHA as energy storage in their tissues. Several companies are working to develop methods of producing PHA from waste water, including Veolia subsidiary Anoxkaldnes. and start-ups, Micromidas, Mango Materials, Full Cycle Bioplastics, Newlight and Paques Biomaterials.

PHAs are processed mainly via injection molding, extrusion and extrusion bubbles into films and hollow bodies.

== Material properties ==
PHA polymers are thermoplastic, can be processed on conventional processing equipment, and are, depending on their composition, ductile and more or less elastic. They differ in their properties according to their chemical composition (homo-or copolyester, contained hydroxy fatty acids).

They are UV stable, in contrast to the other biologically derived plastic, polylactic acid, partial ca. temperatures up to 180 °C, and show a low permeation of water. The crystallinity can lie in the range of a few to 70%. Processability, impact strength and flexibility improves with a higher percentage of valerate in the material. PHAs are soluble in halogenated solvents such chloroform, dichloromethane or dichloroethane.

PHB is similar in its material properties to polypropylene (PP), has a good resistance to moisture and aroma barrier properties. Polyhydroxybutyric acid synthesized from pure PHB is relatively brittle and stiff. PHB copolymers, which may include other fatty acids such as beta-hydroxyvaleric acid, may be elastic.

== Applications ==
Structure of poly-3-hydroxyvalerate (PHV)

Due to its biodegradability and potential to create bioplastics with novel properties, much interest exists in developing the use of PHA-based materials. PHA fits into the green economy as a means to create plastics from non-fossil fuel sources. Furthermore, active research is being carried out for the biotransformation "upcycling" of plastic waste (e.g., polyethylene terephthalate and polyurethane) into PHA using Pseudomonas putida bacteria.

Structure of poly-4-hydroxybutyrate (P4HB)

A PHA copolymer called PHBV (poly(3-hydroxybutyrate-co-3-hydroxyvalerate)) is less stiff and tougher, and it may be used as packaging material.

In June 2005, US company Metabolix, Inc., received the US Presidential Green Chemistry Challenge Award (small business category) for their development and commercialisation of a cost-effective method for manufacturing PHAs.

There are potential applications for PHA produced by micro-organisms in the agricultural, medical and pharmaceutical industries, primarily due to their biodegradability.

Fixation and orthopaedic applications have included sutures, suture fasteners, meniscus repair devices, rivets, tacks, staples, screws (including interference screws), bone plates and bone plating systems, surgical mesh, repair patches, slings, cardiovascular patches, orthopedic pins (including bone filling augmentation material), adhesion barriers, stents, guided tissue repair/regeneration devices, articular cartilage repair devices, nerve guides, tendon repair devices, atrial septal defect repair devices, pericardial patches, bulking and filling agents, vein valves, bone marrow scaffolds, meniscus regeneration devices, ligament and tendon grafts, ocular cell implants, spinal fusion cages, skin substitutes, dural substitutes, bone graft substitutes, bone dowels, wound dressings, and hemostats.
