= Polyhydroxybutyrate =

Polymer

Structure of poly-(R)-3-hydroxybutyrate (P3HB), a polyhydroxyalkanoate

Polyhydroxybutyrate (PHB) is a polyhydroxyalkanoate (PHA), a polymer belonging to the polyesters class that are of interest as bio-derived and biodegradable plastics. The poly-3-hydroxybutyrate (P3HB) form of PHB is probably the most common type of polyhydroxyalkanoate, but other polymers of this class are produced by a variety of organisms: these include poly-4-hydroxybutyrate (P4HB), polyhydroxyvalerate (PHV), polyhydroxyhexanoate (PHH), polyhydroxyoctanoate (PHO) and their copolymers.

== Biosynthesis ==
PHB is produced by organisms (such as Cupriavidus necator, Methylobacterium rhodesianum or Bacillus megaterium) apparently in response to conditions of physiological stress; mainly conditions in which nutrients are limited. The polymer is primarily a product of carbon assimilation (from glucose or starch) and is employed by microorganisms as a form of energy storage molecule to be metabolized when other common energy sources are not available.

Microbial biosynthesis of PHB starts with the condensation of two molecules of acetyl-CoA to give acetoacetyl-CoA which is subsequently reduced to hydroxybutyryl-CoA. This latter compound is then used as a monomer to polymerize PHB. PHAs granules are then recovered by disrupting the cells.

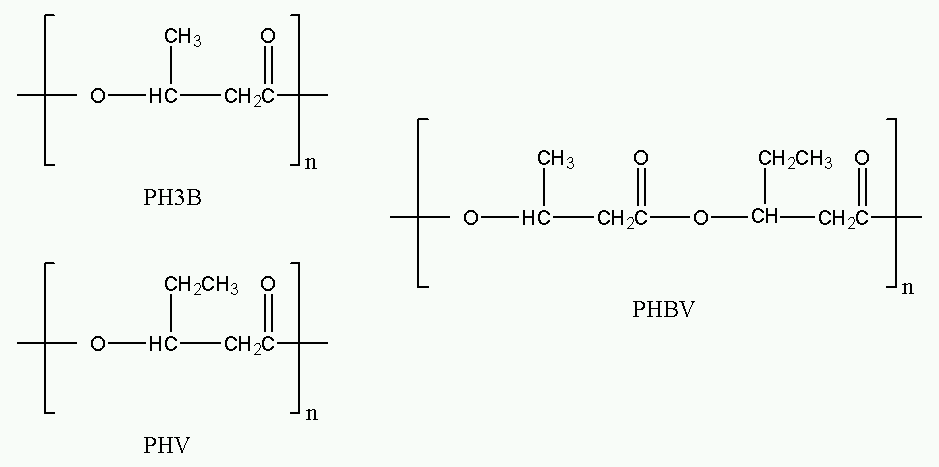
Chemical structures of P3HB, PHV and their copolymer PHBV

== Thermoplastic polymer ==
Most commercial plastics are synthetic polymers derived from petrochemicals. They tend to resist biodegradation. PHB-derived plastics are attractive because they are compostable and derived from renewables and are bio-degradable.

ICI had developed the material to pilot plant stage in the 1980s, but interest faded when it became clear that the cost of material was too high, and its properties could not match those of polypropylene. Some bottles were made for Wella's "Sanara" range of shampoo; an example using the tradename "Biopol" is in the collection of the Science Museum, London.

In 1996, Monsanto (who sold PHB as a copolymer with PHV) bought all patents for making the polymer from ICI/Zeneca including the trademark "Biopol". However, Monsanto's rights to Biopol were sold to the American company Metabolix in 2001 and Monsanto's fermenters producing PHB from bacteria were closed down at the start of 2004.

The first report of PHB production in transgenic plants was in 1992, in Arabidopsis. This involved inserting genes for two enzymes from Alcaligenes eutrophus so that enzymes were produced continuously to synthesise PHB from acetoacetyl-CoA. Systems to produce PHB by plant cells in culture were also developed. Monsanto had interest in producing PHB from plants instead of bacteria. But with media attention on GM crops, there was little news of Monsanto's plans for PHB after 2005.

Biopol is currently used in the medical industry for internal suture. It is nontoxic and biodegradable, so it does not have to be removed after recovery.

TephaFLEX is a bacterially derived poly-4-hydroxybutyrate, manufactured using a recombinant fermentation process by Tepha Medical Devices, intended for a variety of medical applications that require biodegradable materials such as absorbable sutures. It was first marketed in 2008. In 2021 the parent company Tepha, Inc was bought by BD, an international medical technology company.

== Properties ==
- Water-insoluble and relatively resistant to hydrolytic degradation. This differentiates PHB from most other currently available biodegradable plastics, which are either water-soluble or moisture-sensitive.
- Good oxygen permeability.
- Good ultra-violet resistance but poor resistance to acids and bases.
- Soluble in chloroform and other chlorinated hydrocarbons.
- Biocompatible and hence is suitable for medical applications.
- Melting point 175 °C., and glass transition temperature 2 °C.
- Tensile strength 40 MPa, close to that of polypropylene.
- Sinks in water (while polypropylene floats), facilitating its anaerobic biodegradation in sediments.
- Non-toxic.
- Less 'sticky' when melted.

== History ==
Polyhydroxybutyrate was first isolated and characterized in 1925 by French microbiologist Maurice Lemoigne.

== Biodegradation ==
Firmicutes and proteobacteria can degrade PHB. Bacillus, Pseudomonas and Streptomyces species can degrade PHB. Pseudomonas lemoigne, Comamonas sp. Acidovorax faecalis, Aspergillus fumigatus and Variovorax paradoxus are soil microbes capable of degradation. Alcaligenes faecalis, Pseudomonas, and Illyobacter delafieldi, are obtained from anaerobic sludge. Comamonas testosteroni and Pseudomonas stutzeri were obtained from sea water. Few of these are capable of degrading at higher temperatures; notably excepting thermophilic Streptomyces sp. and a thermophilic strain of Aspergillus sp.
