= Yield10 Bioscience =

Agricultural Science Company

- Traded as: Nasdaq: YTEN
- Headquarters: Woburn, MA, USA
- Key people: Anthony J. Sinskey (Co-Founder), Oliver P. Peoples (CEO), Kristi Snell (CSO)
- Website: www.yield10bio.com

Yield10 Bioscience (formerly Metabolix, Inc.) is a company developing new technologies to achieve improvements in crop yield to enhance global food security.

== History ==
Founded in 1992, with the help of a licensing agreement with Massachusetts Institute of Technology (MIT), Metabolix, Inc. is a bioscience company with headquarters in Cambridge, Massachusetts. Metabolix provides sustainable solutions to the plastic, chemical and energy industries. Oliver Peoples, Ph.D., and Anthony Sinskey, Ph.D., co-founded Metabolix after work at the (MIT) that identified the elementary methods and means for engineering polyhydroxyalkanoates production in plants and bacteria, thus making them biodegradable.

In early 2017, Metabolix became Yield10 Bioscience, its crop research program.

In 2024, Yield10 Biosciences filed for Chapter 11 bankruptcy protection, listing assets and liabilities between $1 million and $10 million.

== Products ==
=== Crop technologies ===
The centerpiece of the Metabolix's plant technology is polyhydroxybutyrate (PHB), the simplest member of the broad polyhydroxyalkanoate (PHA) family of biopolymers. They have worked with switchgrass, camelina, sugarcane, as well as tobacco.

In 2009, Metabolix completed a field trial producing PHA in a tobacco crop.

In 2012, Metabolix secured an ARPA-E grant to improve productivity of biofuel production in plants, specifically camelina.

In 2011, Metabolix was awarded a $6.0 million grant to produce PHB in switchgrass and to develop methods to thermally convert the PHB-containing switchgrass to crotonic acid and a higher density residual biomass fraction for production of biofuel.

In 2017, Yield10 participated in a Department of Energy program to help boost Camelina oilseed.

=== Platforms ===
==== C3 ====
C3 is the most common form of photosynthesis, existing in most crops suitable for human consumption, including wheat, canola, soybean and rice. In 2019 Yield10 announced results from its 2018 field test, claiming that its C3003 gene trait showed an 11% increase in seed yield among canola crops, when compared to control plants. Similarly, C3003 met its objectives for soybean yield, and showed an increase in Camelina.

==== C4 ====
C4 photosynthesis plants, like corn and sugar cane, possess a more complex system of metabolic pathways. In 2018, Yield reported promising results for its C3004 gene trait in Camelina lines, following growth chamber studies.

==== CRISPR ====
Yield10 has also commenced development of CRISPR-enabled technology to impact crop yield. The company received a nonregulated status letter from the USDA-APHIS Biotechnology Regulatory Services (BRS) acknowledging that its camelina line has had a gene disrupted using CRISPR/Cas9 gene editing technology, resulting in the desired phenotype.

==== PHA-based Biomaterials ====
In 2019, Yield10 filed a U.S. Patent application for new technology enabling low-cost production of PHA-based biomaterials, knowing for their use in water treatment to remove nitrogen and phosphates, to maintain the viability and vigor of Camelina seed.

== Partnerships ==
In 2018, Yield10 was granted a non-exclusive research license to CRISPR-Cas9 gene editing technology by DowDuPont’s agricultural business, Corteva Agriscience, and the non-profit Broad Institute of MIT and Harvard. The Company also has established a partnership with University of Missouri, exercising an option with the University to obtain exclusive worldwide licenses to advanced technologies for oilseed crops. The relationship expanded in 2019 to include a new gene target. In 2018, Yield10 was granted a non-exclusive research license to Forage Genetics International, LLC, a subsidiary of Land O’Lakes, Inc., to conduct research with the novel traits within its forage sorghum development program as a strategy to improve biomass yields.
