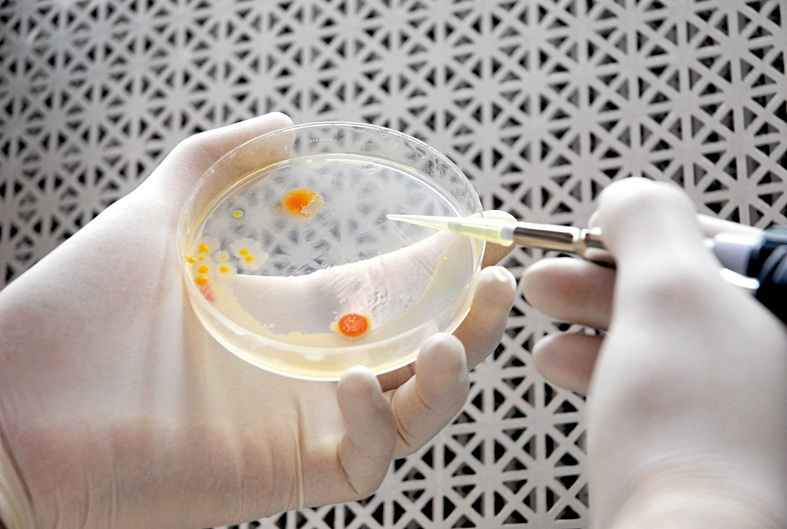

Scientific classification
- Domain: Bacteria
- Kingdom: Pseudomonadati
- Phylum: Pseudomonadota
- Class: Betaproteobacteria
- Order: Burkholderiales
- Family: Burkholderiaceae
- Genus: Cupriavidus
- Species: C. necator

Binomial name
- Cupriavidus necator (Davis 1969) Yabuuchi et al. 1996

Synonyms
- Ralstonia eutropha

= Cupriavidus necator =

Species of bacterium

Cupriavidus necator is a Gram-negative soil bacterium of the class Betaproteobacteria.

== Taxonomy ==
Cupriavidus necator has gone through a series of name changes. In the first half of the 20th century, many micro-organisms were isolated for their ability to use hydrogen. Hydrogen-metabolizing chemolithotrophic organisms were clustered into the group Hydrogenomonas. C. necator was originally named Hydrogenomonas eutrophus because it fell under the Hydrogenomonas classification and was "well nourished and robust". Some of the original H. eutrophus cultures isolated were by Bovell and Wilde. After characterizing cell morphology, metabolism and GC content, the Hydrogenomonas nomenclature was disbanded because it comprised many species of microorganisms. H. eutrophus was then renamed Alcaligenes eutropha because it was a micro-organism with degenerated peritrichous flagellation. Investigating phenotype, lipid composition, fatty acid composition and 16S rRNA analysis, A. eutropha was found to belong to the genus Ralstonia and named Ralstonia eutropha. Upon further study of the genus, Ralstonia was found to comprise two phenotypically distinct clusters. The new genus Wautersia was created from one of these clusters which included R. eutropha. In turn R. eutropha was renamed Wautersia eutropha. Looking at DNA–DNA hybridization and phenotype comparison with Cupriavidus necator, W. eutropha was found to be the same species as previously described C. necator. Because C. necator was named in 1987 far before the name change to R. eutropha and W. eutropha, the name C. necator was assigned to R. eutropha according to Rule 23a of the International Code of Nomenclature of Bacteria.

== Metabolism ==
Cupriavidus necator is a hydrogen-oxidizing bacterium ("knallgas" bacterium) capable of growing at the interface of anaerobic and aerobic environments. It can easily adapt between heterotrophic and autotrophic lifestyles. Both organic compounds and hydrogen can be used as a source of energy C. necator can perform aerobic or anaerobic respiration by denitrification of nitrate and/or nitrite to nitrogen gas. When growing under autotrophic conditions, C. necator fixes carbon through the reductive pentose phosphate pathway. It is known to produce and sequester polyhydroxyalkanoate (PHA) plastics when exposed to excess amounts of sugar substrate. PHA can accumulate to levels around 90% of the cell's dry weight. To better characterize the lifestyle of C. necator, the genomes of two strains have been sequenced.

== Hydrogenases ==
Cupriavidus necator can use hydrogen gas as a source of energy when growing under autotrophic conditions. It contains four different hydrogenases that have [Ni-Fe] active sites and all perform this reaction:

H_{2} $\rightleftharpoons$ 2H^{+} + 2e^{−}

The hydrogenases of C. necator are like other typical [Ni-Fe] hydrogenases because they are made up of a large and a small subunit. The large subunit is where the [Ni-Fe] active site resides and the small subunit is composed of [Fe-S] clusters. However, the hydrogenases of C. necator are different from typical [Ni-Fe] hydrogenases because they are tolerant to oxygen and are not inhibited by CO. While the four hydrogenases perform the same reaction in the cell, each hydrogenase is linked to a different cellular process. The differences between the regulatory hydrogenase, membrane-bound hydrogenase, soluble hydrogenase and actinobacterial hydrogenase in C. necator are described below.

=== Regulatory hydrogenase ===
The first hydrogenase is a regulatory hydrogenase (RH) that signals to the cell hydrogen is present. The RH is a protein containing large and small [Ni-Fe] hydrogenase subunits attached to a histidine protein kinase subunit. The hydrogen gas is oxidized at the [Ni-Fe] center in the large subunit and in turn reduces the [Fe-S] clusters in the small subunit. It is unknown whether the electrons are transferred from the [Fe-S] clusters to the protein kinase domain. The histidine protein kinase activates a response regulator. The response regulator is active in the dephosphorylated form. The dephosphorylated response regulator promotes the transcription of the membrane bound hydrogenase and soluble hydrogenase.

=== Membrane-bound hydrogenase ===
The membrane-bound hydrogenase (MBH) is linked to the respiratory chain through a specific cytochrome b-related protein in C. necator. Hydrogen gas is oxidized at the [Ni-Fe] active site in the large subunit and the electrons are shuttled through the [Fe-S] clusters in the small subunit to the cytochrome b-like protein. The MBH is located on the outer cytoplasmic membrane. It recovers energy for the cell by funneling electrons into the respiratory chain and by increasing the proton gradient. The MBH in C. necator is not inhibited by CO and is tolerant to oxygen.

=== NAD+-reducing hydrogenase ===
The NAD+-reducing hydrogenase (soluble hydrogenase, SH) creates a NADH-reducing equivalence by oxidizing hydrogen gas. The SH is a heterohexameric protein with two subunits making up the large and small subunits of the [Ni-Fe] hydrogenase and the other two subunits comprising a reductase module similar to the one of Complex I. The [Ni-Fe] active site oxidized hydrogen gas which transfers electrons to a FMN-a cofactor, then to a [Fe-S] cluster relay of the small hydrogenase subunit and the reductase module, then to another FMN-b cofactor and finally to NAD^{+}. The reducing equivalences are then used for fixing carbon dioxide when C. necator is growing autotrophically.

The active site of the SH of C. necator H16 has been extensively studied because C. necator H16 can be produced in large amounts, can be genetically manipulated, and can be analyzed with spectrographic techniques. However, no crystal structure is currently available for the C. necator H16 soluble hydrogenase in the presence of oxygen to determine the interactions of the active site with the rest of the protein.

==== Typical anaerobic [Ni-Fe] hydrogenases ====
The [Ni-Fe] hydrogenase from Desulfovibrio vulgaris and D. gigas have similar protein structures to each other and represent typical [Ni-Fe] hydrogenases. The large subunit contains the [Ni-Fe] active site buried deep in the core of the protein and the small subunit contains [Fe-S] clusters. The Ni atom is coordinated to the Desulfovibrio hydrogenase by 4 cysteine ligands. Two of these same cysteine ligands also bridge the Fe of the [Ni-Fe] active site. The Fe atom also contains three ligands, one CO and two CN that complete the active site. These additional ligands might contribute to the reactivity or help stabilize the Fe atom in the low spin +2 oxidation state. Typical [NiFe] hydrogenases like those of D. vulgaris and D. gigas are poisoned by oxygen because an oxygen atom binds strongly to the NiFe active site.

==== C. necator oxygen-tolerant SH ====
The SH in C. necator are unique for other organisms because it is oxygen tolerant. The active site of the SH has been studied to learn why this protein is tolerant to oxygen. A recent study showed that oxygen tolerance as implemented in the SH is based on a continuous catalytically driven detoxification of O_{2} [Ref missing]. The genes encoding this SH can be up-regulated under heterotrophic growth condition using glycerol in the growth media and this enables aerobic production and purification of the same enzyme.

=== Applications ===
The oxygen-tolerant hydrogenases of C. necator have been studied for diverse purposes. C. necator was studied as an attractive organism to help support life in space. It can fix carbon dioxide as a carbon source, use the urea in urine as a nitrogen source, and use hydrogen as an energy source to create dense cultures that could be used as a source of protein.

Electrolysis of water is one way of creating oxygenic atmosphere in space and C. necator was investigated to recycle the hydrogen produced during this process.

Oxygen-tolerant hydrogenases are being used to investigate biofuels. Hydrogenases from C. necator have been used to coat electrode surfaces to create hydrogen fuel cells tolerant to oxygen and carbon monoxide and to design hydrogen-producing light complexes. In addition, the hydrogenases from C. necator have been used to create hydrogen sensors. Genetically modified C. necator can produce isobutanol from CO_{2} that can directly substitute or blend with gasoline. The organism emits the isobutanol without having to be destroyed to obtain it.

==== Carbon fixation and bioplastic production ====
In addition to its ability to synthesize polyhydroxyalkanoates (PHAs), Cupriavidus necator can channel carbon derived from CO₂ fixation into polymer production. Carbon assimilated through the Calvin–Benson–Bassham cycle enters central metabolism and may be redirected toward the biosynthesis of polyhydroxybutyrate (PHB), particularly under nutrient-limited conditions such as nitrogen depletion.

This shift in carbon allocation reflects a metabolic strategy in which excess fixed carbon is stored as PHB rather than used for growth. PHB functions as an intracellular carbon and energy reserve and can be mobilized when external resources become limited. Due to its biodegradability and biocompatibility, PHB is considered a promising alternative to petroleum-derived plastics.

The coupling of carbon fixation and PHB accumulation has attracted interest for sustainable biotechnology, as it enables the conversion of CO₂ into value-added materials. As a result, C. necator has been investigated as a platform organism for producing bioplastics from gaseous substrates such as CO₂, H₂, and O₂, linking carbon sequestration with materials manufacturing.

The distribution of carbon flux between biomass formation and PHB accumulation is influenced by environmental conditions, including nutrient availability, oxygen levels, and substrate supply. Under conditions of nutrient limitation or excess carbon, metabolic flux is often redirected toward PHB synthesis, whereas conditions favoring rapid growth tend to prioritize biomass production.

Systems-level studies, including genome-scale metabolic modeling and flux balance analysis, have been used to investigate how these environmental factors affect carbon flux distribution and to identify strategies for improving PHB yields in biotechnological applications.

== Industrial uses ==
Researchers at UCLA have genetically modified a strain of the species C. necator (formerly known as R. eutropha H16) to produce isobutanol from CO_{2} feedstock using electricity produced by a solar cell. The project, funded by the U.S. Dept. of Energy, is a potential high energy-density electrofuel that could use existing infrastructure to replace oil as a transportation fuel.

Chemical and biomolecular engineers at Korea Advanced Institute of Science and Technology has presented a scalable way to convert CO_{2} in the air into a polyester by means of the C. necator.

Beyond CO_{2}-based applications, C. necator is used for the biotechnological production of polyhydroxybutyrate (PHB), a key precursor for bioplastics, from renewable substrates such as cassava-derived dextrose, with metabolic network modelling (e.g., flux balance analysis), aiding process optimization and the design of feeding strategies in bioprocesses.
