= Yonkoma =

Comic strip format

Traditional yonkoma layout

Yonkoma manga (4コマ漫画; "four cell manga" or 4-koma for short) is a comic strip format that generally consists of gag comic strips within four panels of equal size, following a structure known as kishōtenketsu.

== Origin ==
Rakuten Kitazawa (who wrote under the name Yasuji Kitazawa) produced the first yonkoma in 1902. Entitled Jiji Manga, it is thought to have been influenced by the works of Frank Arthur Nankivell and of Frederick Burr Opper.

== Structure ==
Traditionally, yonkoma follow a structure known as kishōtenketsu. This word is a compound formed from the following Japanese kanji characters:

- Ki (起): The first panel forms the basis of the story; it sets the scene.
- Shō (承): The second panel develops upon the foundation of the story laid down in the first panel.
- Ten (転): The third panel is the climax, in which an unforeseen development occurs.
- Ketsu (結): The fourth panel is the conclusion, in which the effects of the third panel are seen.

Yonkoma most commonly consists of gag comic strips within four panels of equal size ordered from top to bottom. They also sometimes run right-to-left horizontally or use a hybrid 2×2 style, depending on the layout requirements of the publication in which they appear.

== Uses ==
These comic strips appear in almost all types of publications in Japan, including manga magazines, graphic novels, the comics section of newspapers, game magazines, cooking magazines, and so forth. The plot often ends within the four panels; although some serial development may pass on to future installments, creating a more continuous story. Some yonkoma also tackle serious topics, though most do so with humor. Some manga occasionally use yonkoma, usually at the end of a chapter or bound volume, as a non-canon joke to complement the story.

== See also ==
- Jo-ha-kyū – A type of three-act structure found in many traditional Japanese narrative forms
- American comic strips, where Peanuts popularized using four panels
