= Louis Dalrymple =

American cartoonist (1866–1905)

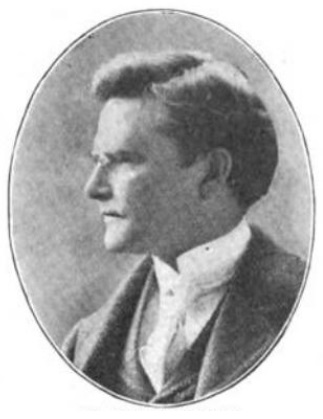
Louis Dalrymple

Louis Dalrymple (January 19, 1866 – December 28, 1905) was an American cartoonist, known for his caricatures in publications such as Puck, Judge, and the New York Daily Graphic. Born in Cambridge, Illinois, he studied at the Pennsylvania Academy of Fine Arts, and the Art Students League of New York, and in 1885 became the chief cartoonist of the Daily Graphic.

His first wife was Letia Carpenter from Brooklyn. His second wife was Mary Ann Good. He died in 1905 of paresis in a New York sanitarium.

== Gallery ==
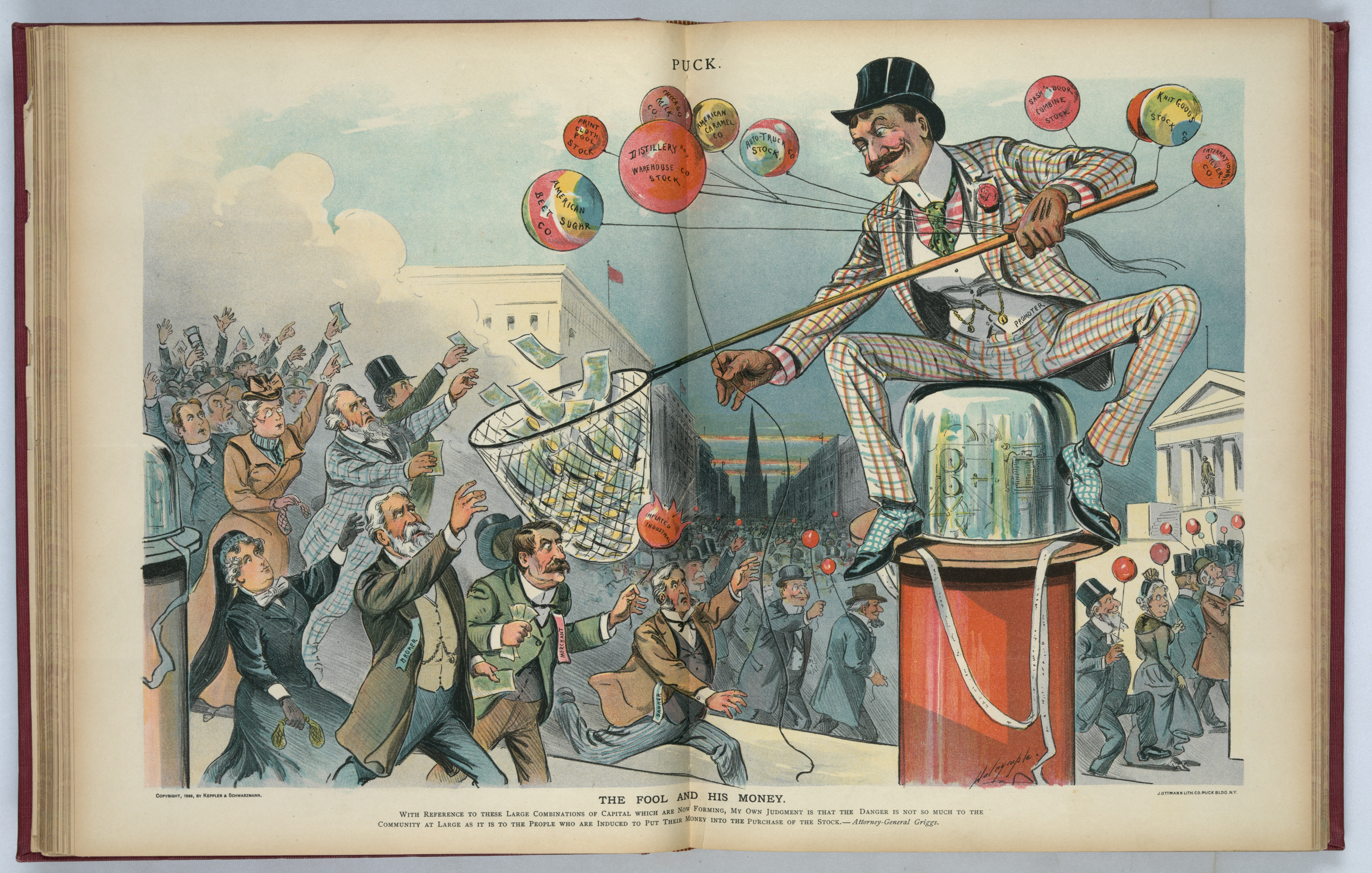
The fool and his money, 1899

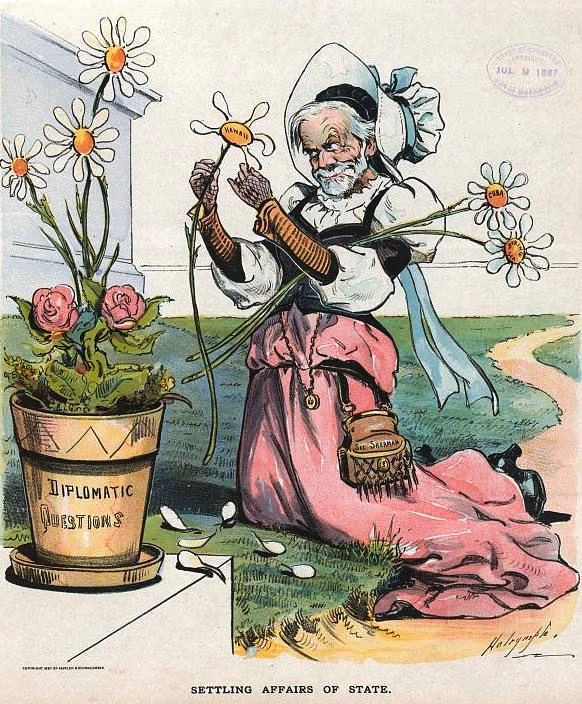
John Sherman, Secretary of State, dressed as an old woman with a purse labeled "Sec. Sherman", plucking the petals off daisies labeled "Hawaii, Cuba, and Bering Sea" picked from a flowerpot labeled "Diplomatic Questions"

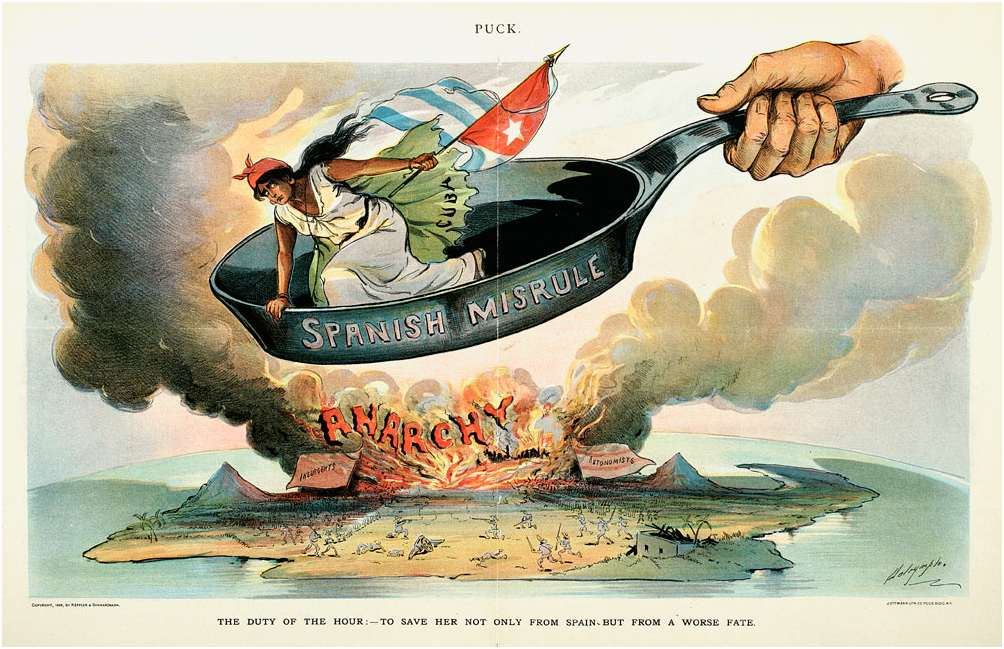
Urging war with Spain over Cuba, 1898

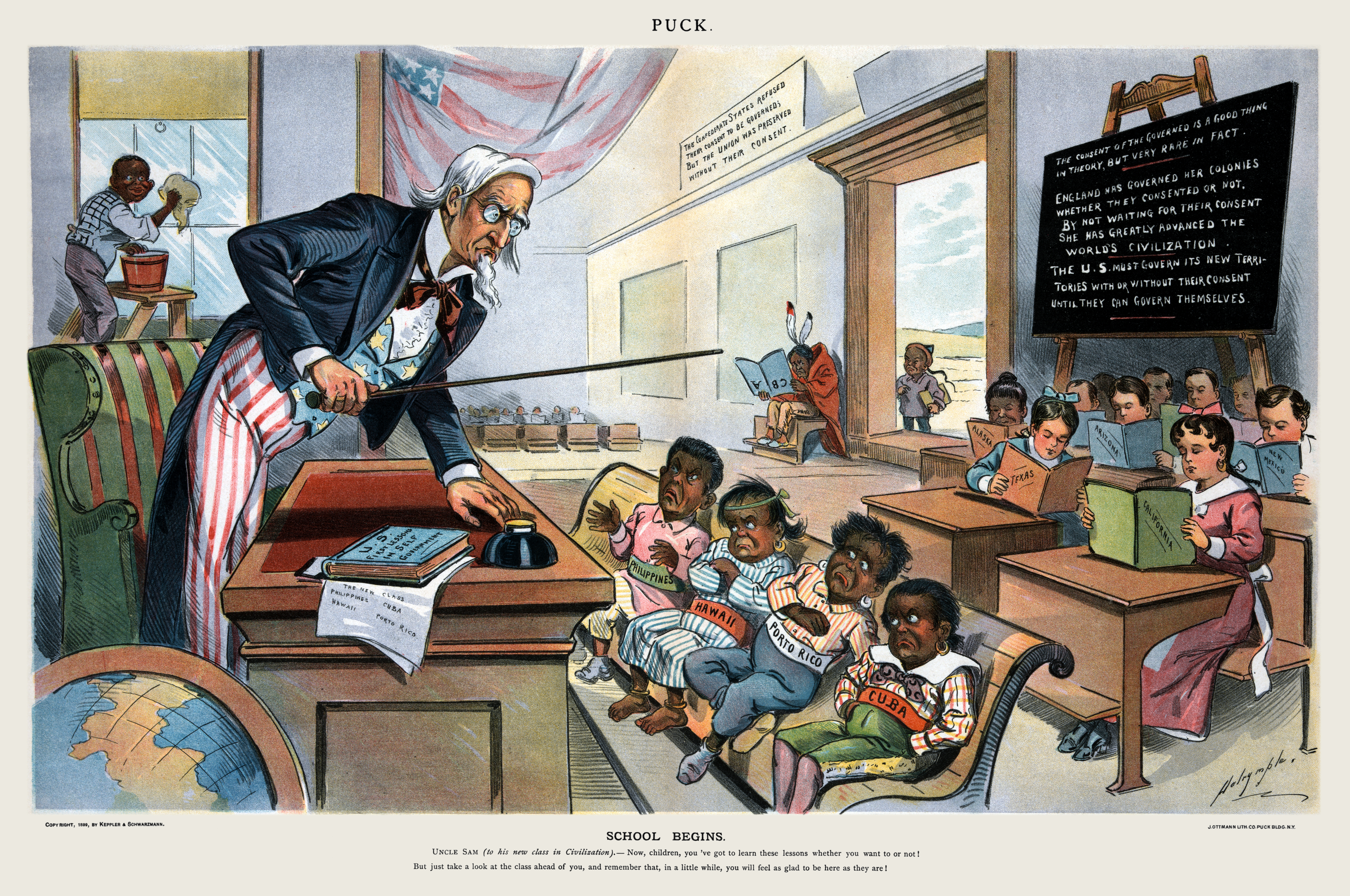
School Begins by Louis Dalrymple, January 25, 1899
