= Osaka Puck =

Japanese magazine

- Categories: Humor magazine
- Frequency: Bimonthly
- Founded: 1905
- First issue: November 1905
- Final issue: March 1950
- Company: Osaka Puck Company
- Country: Japan
- Based in: Osaka
- Language: Japanese

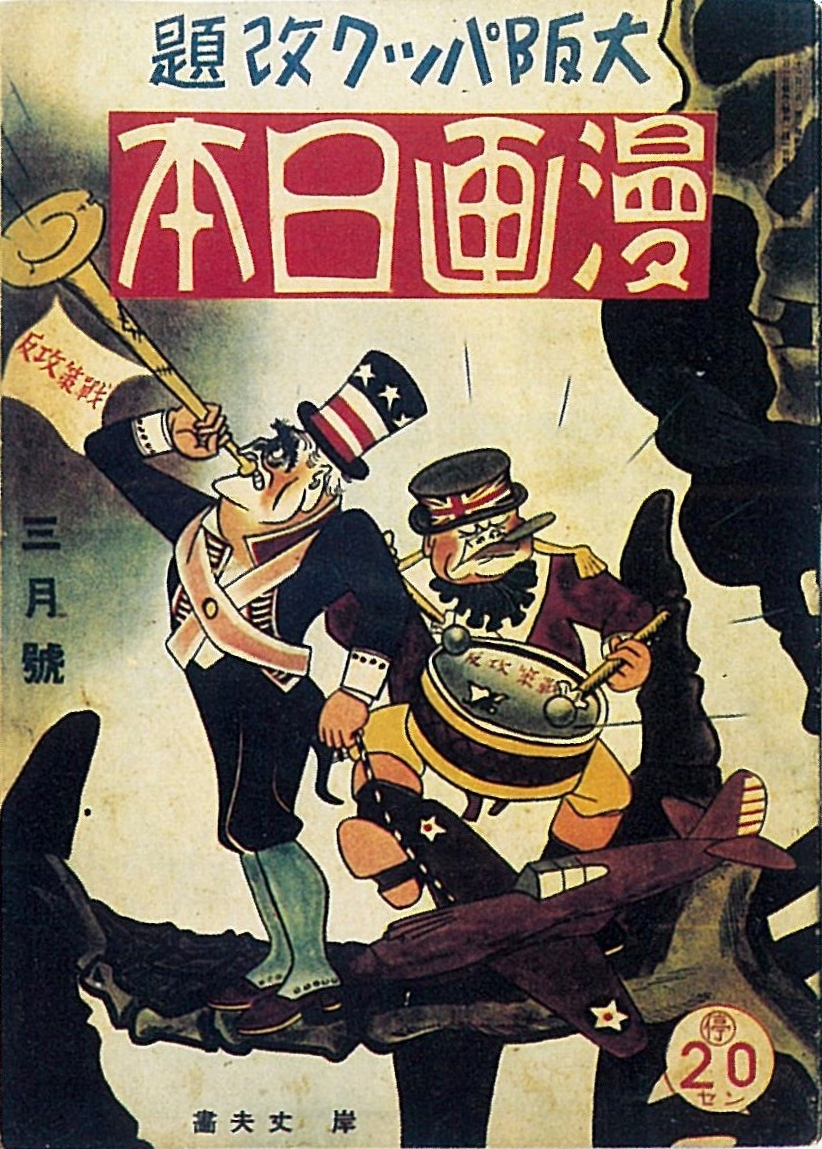
1943 cover

Osaka Puck (Japanese: 大阪パック, Hepburn: Osaka Pakku) was a bimonthly Japanese manga magazine published in Osaka from November 1906 to March 1950. Its publisher when it first launched was Kibunkan, located in the Funeba area in central Osaka, which later changed its name to the Osaka Puck Company. When it ceased publication, it was published by the Osaka Shimbun Company.

== Overview ==
Osaka Puck was launched in 1906, with the Western-style artist Akamatsu Rinsaku playing a central role. Its format placed it in opposition to the satirical comics magazine Tokyo Puck, which launched in Tokyo in 1905 under editor-in-chief Kitazawa Rakuten. In its early years, it grew its circulation by perfecting sales through station vendors. It continued regular publication as a "wholesome manga magazine" even while other satirical comics magazines shut down one after the other due to excessive competition and the intensification of the Pacific War. It changed its name to Manga Japan in 1943 in accordance with a prohibition on the English language, but in January 1945 was forced to cease publication temporarily.

Osaka Puck resumed publication in September 1945 after the end of the war. Although it relaunched in 1946 under the title Reading Material and Manga, it ultimately ceased publication in March 1950 after more than 43 years in print. It held the record for longest-running comics periodical in Japan until April 1997, when it was surpassed by Kodansha's Nakayoshi.
