= Manga =

Japanese comics or graphic novels

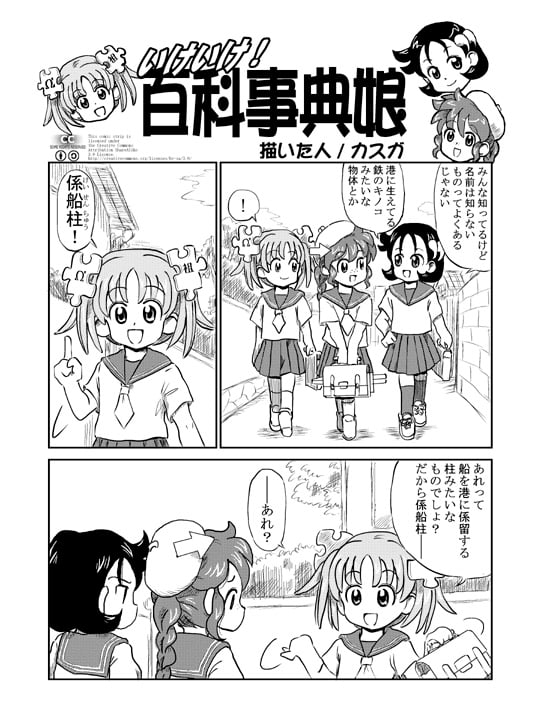
- A page from the manga Go Go! Encyclopedia Girls by artist Kasuga, depicting Wikipe-tan, Commons-tan and Quote-tan
- Publishers: See list
- Publications: See list
- Creators: See list
- Series: See list
- Languages: Japanese

Related articles

Manga (Japanese: 漫画; IPA: [maŋga] (Note: English: /ˈmæŋɡə/, also US: /ˈmɑːŋɡə/)) are comics or graphic novels originating from Japan. Most manga conform to a style developed in Japan in the late 19th century, and the form has a long history in earlier Japanese art. The term manga is used in Japan to refer to both comics and cartooning, regardless of origin. Outside of Japan, the word is typically used to refer to comics originally published in Japan specifically.

In Japan, manga is widely read by people of all ages and backgrounds. The medium features a broad range of genres, including action, adventure, business and commerce, comedy, detective, drama, historical, horror, mystery, romance, science fiction and fantasy, erotica (hentai and ecchi), sports and games, and thriller, among others. Many manga are translated into other languages.

Since the 1950s, manga has become an increasingly major part of the Japanese publishing industry. By 1995, the manga market in Japan was valued at ¥586.4 billion (US$6–7 billion), with annual sales of 1.9 billion manga books and manga magazines (also known as manga anthologies) in Japan (equivalent to 15 issues per person). The domestic manga market in Japan remained in the ¥400 billion range annually from 2014 to 2019. In 2020, as the COVID-19 pandemic led to increased time spent at home, the market rapidly expanded to ¥612.6 billion. Growth continued even after the end of lockdowns, reaching a record high of ¥704.3 billion in 2024. Alongside this rapid expansion, the print manga market has continued to shrink; as of 2024, digital manga accounts for approximately ¥500 billion, while print manga makes up about ¥200 billion. Manga have also gained a significant worldwide readership. By the late 2010s, manga started to significantly outsell American comics.

As of 2021, the top four comics publishers in the world are manga publishers Shueisha, Kodansha, Kadokawa, and Shogakukan. In 2020, the North American manga market was valued at almost $250 million. According to NPD BookScan, manga made up 76% of overall comics and graphic novel sales in the US in 2021. The fast growth of the North American manga market is attributed to manga's wide availability on digital reading apps, book retailer chains such as Barnes & Noble, and online retailers such as Amazon, as well as the massive popularity of anime. Manga represented 38% of the French comics market in 2005. This is equivalent to approximately three times that of the United States and was valued at about €460 million ($640 million). In Europe and the Middle East, the market was valued at $250 million in 2012.

Manga is typically printed in black-and-white—due to time constraints, artistic reasons (as coloring could lessen the impact of the artwork) and to keep printing costs low—although some full-color manga exist (e.g., Colorful). In Japan, manga are usually serialized in large manga magazines, often containing many stories, each presented in a single episode to be continued in the next issue. A single manga story is almost always longer than a single issue from a Western comic. Collected chapters are usually republished in tankōbon volumes, frequently but not exclusively paperback books. A manga artist (mangaka in Japanese) typically works with a few assistants in a small studio and is associated with a creative editor from a commercial publishing company. If a manga series is popular enough, it may be adapted into an anime after or during its run. Sometimes, manga are based on previous live-action or animated films.

Manga has long been a field in Japan in which women have had a substantial presence and, according to Machiko Satonaka, has been largely unaffected by gender disparities in participation and career opportunities, with women accounting for approximately half of all manga artists at least between 1975 and 2005. As of 2026, Machiko Hasegawa, a female manga artist best known as the creator of Sazae-san, remains the only manga artist to have been awarded the People's Honour Award.

Manga-influenced comics, among original works, exist in other parts of the world, particularly in those places that speak Chinese ("manhua"), Korean ("manhwa"), English ("OEL manga"), and French ("manfra"), as well as in Algeria ("DZ-manga").

== Etymology ==
The kanji for "manga" from the preface to Shiji no yukikai (1798)

The word "manga" comes from the Japanese word 漫画 (katakana: マンガ; hiragana: まんが), composed of the two kanji 漫 (man) meaning 'whimsical or impromptu' and 画 (ga) meaning 'pictures'. The same term is the root of the Korean word for comics, manhwa, and the Chinese word manhua.

The word first came into common usage in the late 18th century with the publication of such works as Santō Kyōden's picturebook Shiji no yukikai (1798), and in the early 19th century with such works as Aikawa Minwa's Manga hyakujo (1814) and the celebrated Hokusai Manga books (1814–1834) containing assorted drawings from the sketchbooks of the famous ukiyo-e artist Hokusai. Rakuten Kitazawa (1876–1955) first used the word "manga" in the modern sense.

In Japanese, "manga" refers to all kinds of cartooning, comics, and animation. Among English speakers, "manga" has the stricter meaning of "Japanese comics", in parallel to the usage of "anime" in and outside Japan. The term "ani-manga" is used to describe comics produced from animation cels.

== History and characteristics ==
A kamishibai storyteller from Sazae-san by Machiko Hasegawa. Sazae appears with her hair in a bun.

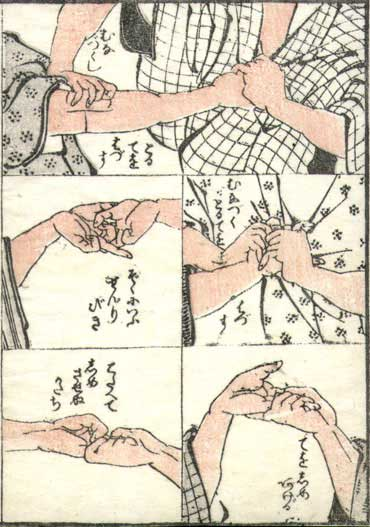
Hokusai Manga depicting self-defense techniques (early 19th century)

Manga originated from emakimono (scrolls) and Chōjū-jinbutsu-giga, dating back to the 12th century. During the Edo period (1603–1867), a book of drawings titled Toba Ehon further developed what would later be called manga. The word itself first came into common usage in 1798, with the publication of works such as Santō Kyōden's picturebook Shiji no yukikai (1798), and in the early 19th century with such works as Aikawa Minwa's Manga hyakujo (1814) and the Hokusai Manga books (1814–1834). Adam L. Kern has suggested that kibyōshi, picture books from the late 18th century, may have been the world's first comic books. These graphical narratives share with modern manga humorous, satirical, and romantic themes. Some works were mass-produced as serials using woodblock printing. However, Eastern comics are generally held separate from the evolution of Western comics; Western comic art probably originated in 17th century Italy.

Writers on manga history have described two broad and complementary processes shaping modern manga. One view represented by other writers such as Frederik L. Schodt, Kinko Ito, and Adam L. Kern, stress continuity of Japanese cultural and aesthetic traditions, including pre-war, Meiji, and pre-Meiji culture and art. The other view emphasizes events occurring during and after the Allied occupation of Japan (1945–1952) and stresses U.S. cultural influences, including U.S. comics (brought to Japan by the GIs) and images and themes from U.S. television, film, and cartoons (especially Disney).

Regardless of its source, an explosion of artistic creativity occurred in the post-war period, involving manga artists such as Osamu Tezuka (Astro Boy) and Machiko Hasegawa (Sazae-san). Astro Boy quickly became (and remains) immensely popular in Japan and elsewhere, and the anime adaptation of Sazae-san drew more viewers than any other anime on Japanese television in 2011. Tezuka and Hasegawa both made stylistic innovations. In Tezuka's "cinematographic" technique, the panels sequenced akin to a motion picture that reveals details of action bordering on slow motion as well as rapid zooms from distance to close-up shots. This kind of visual dynamism was widely adopted by later manga artists. Hasegawa's focus on daily life and women's experiences also came to characterize later shōjo manga. Between 1950 and 1969, an increasingly large readership for manga emerged in Japan with the solidification of its two main marketing genres, shōnen manga aimed at boys and shōjo manga aimed at girls.

In 1969, a group of female manga artists (later called the Year 24 Group, also known as Magnificent 24s) made their shōjo manga debut ("year 24" comes from the Japanese name for the year 1949, the birth-year of many of these artists). The group included Moto Hagio, Riyoko Ikeda, Yumiko Ōshima, Keiko Takemiya, and Ryoko Yamagishi. Thereafter, primarily female manga artists would draw shōjo for a readership of girls and young women. In the following decades (1975–present), shōjo manga continued to develop stylistically while simultaneously evolving different but overlapping subgenres. Major subgenres include romance, superheroines, and "Ladies Comics" (in Japanese, redisu (レディース), redikomi (レディコミ), and josei (女性)).

Modern shōjo manga romance features love as a major theme set into emotionally intense narratives of self-realization. With the superheroines, shōjo manga saw releases such as Pink Hanamori's Mermaid Melody Pichi Pichi Pitch, Reiko Yoshida's Tokyo Mew Mew, and Naoko Takeuchi's Sailor Moon, which became popular in both manga and anime formats. Groups (or sentai) of women working together have also been popular within this genre, such as Lucia, Hanon, and Rina singing together, and Sailor Moon, Sailor Mercury, Sailor Mars, Sailor Jupiter, and Sailor Venus working together.

Manga for male readers sub-divides according to the age of its intended readership: boys up to 18 years old (shōnen manga) and young men 18 to 30 years old (seinen manga); as well as by content, including action-adventure often involving male heroes, slapstick humor, themes of honor, and sometimes explicit sex. Japanese uses different kanji for two closely allied meanings of "seinen", 青年 for "youth, young man" and 成年 for "adult, majority"—the second referring to pornographic manga aimed at grown men and also called seijin (成人, 'adult'). Shōnen, seinen, and seijin manga share a number of features in common.

Boys and young men became some of the earliest readers of manga after World War II. From the 1950s on, shōnen manga focused on topics thought to interest the archetypal boy, including subjects like robots, space-travel, and heroic action-adventure. Popular themes include science fiction, technology, sports, and supernatural settings. Manga with solitary costumed superheroes like Superman, Batman, and Spider-Man generally did not become as popular.

The role of girls and women in manga produced for male readers has evolved considerably over time to include those featuring single pretty girls (bishōjo) such as Belldandy from Oh My Goddess!, stories where such girls and women surround the hero, as in Negima and Hanaukyo Maid Team, or groups of heavily armed female warriors (sentō bishōjo)

By the turn of the 21st century, manga achieved worldwide popularity.

With the relaxation of censorship in Japan in the 1990s, an assortment of explicit sexual material appeared in manga intended for male readers, and correspondingly continued into the English translations. In 2010, the Tokyo Metropolitan Government considered a bill to restrict minors' access to such content.

The gekiga style of storytelling—thematically somber, adult-oriented, and sometimes deeply violent—focuses on the day-in, day-out grim realities of life, often drawn in a gritty and unvarnished fashion. Gekiga such as Sampei Shirato's 1959–1962 Chronicles of a Ninja's Military Accomplishments (Ninja Bugeichō) arose in the late 1950s and 1960s, partly from left-wing student and working-class political activism, and partly from the aesthetic dissatisfaction of young manga artists like Yoshihiro Tatsumi with existing manga.

== Publications and exhibition ==
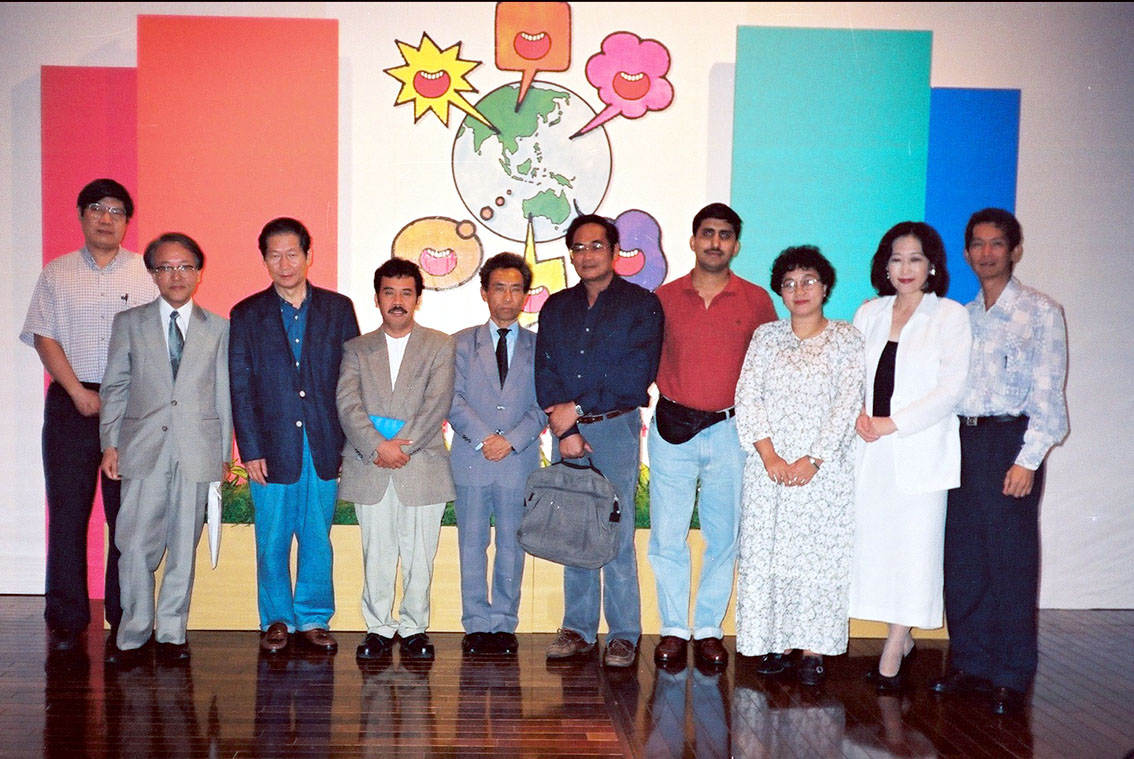
Delegates of 3rd Asian Cartoon Exhibition, held at Tokyo (Annual Manga Exhibition) by The Japan Foundation

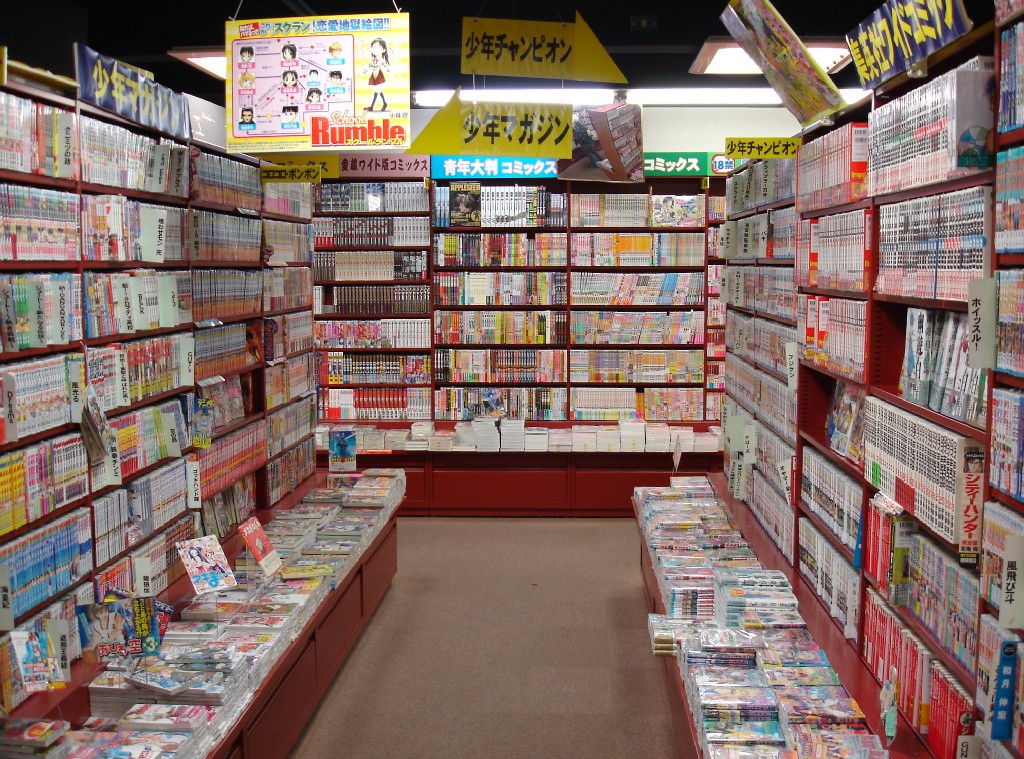
A manga store in Japan

In Japan, manga constituted an annual 40.6 billion yen (approximately US$395 million) publication-industry by 2007. In 2006, sales of manga books made up for about 27% of total book sales, and manga magazines made up 20% of total magazine sales. The manga industry has expanded worldwide, where distribution companies license and reprint manga into their native languages.

Marketeers primarily classify manga by the age and gender of the target readership. In particular, books and magazines sold to boys (shōnen) and girls (shōjo) have distinctive cover-art, and most bookstores place them on different shelves. Due to cross-readership, consumer response is not limited by demographics. For example, male readers may subscribe to a series intended for female readers, and vice versa. Japan has manga cafés, or manga kissa (kissa is an abbreviation of kissaten). At a manga kissa, people drink coffee, read manga and sometimes stay overnight.

The Kyoto International Manga Museum maintains a very large website listing manga published in Japanese.

=== Magazines ===
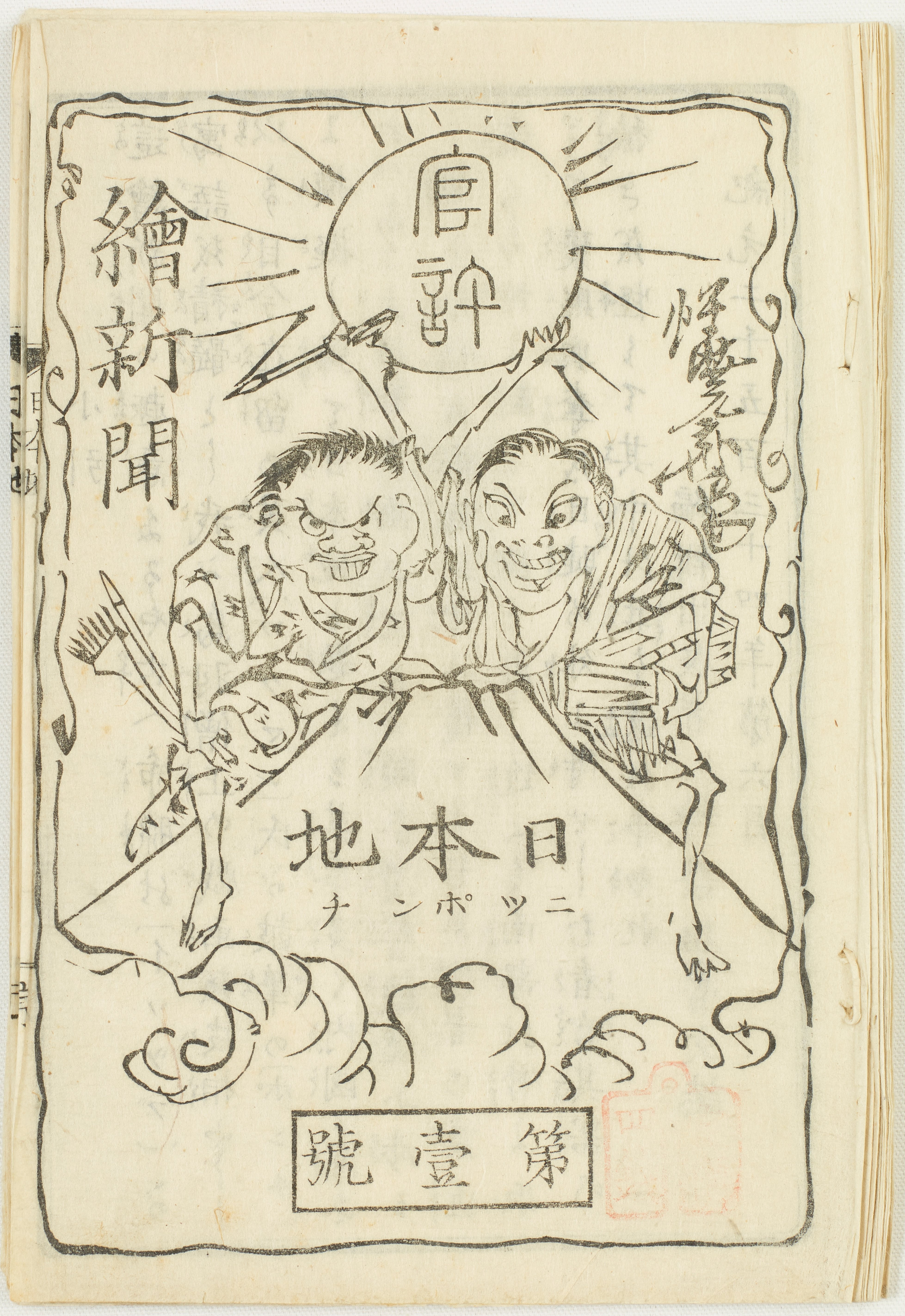
E-shimbun Nippon-chi (1874), published by Kanagaki Robun and Kawanabe Kyosai.

E-shimbun Nippon-chi (1874), published by Kanagaki Robun and Kawanabe Kyosai, is credited as the first manga magazine ever made.

Manga magazines or anthologies (漫画雑誌, manga zasshi) usually have many series running concurrently with approximately 20–40 pages allocated to each series per issue. Other magazines such as the anime fandom magazine Newtype featured single chapters within their monthly periodicals. Other magazines like Nakayoshi feature many stories written by many different artists; these magazines, or "anthology magazines", as they are also known (colloquially "phone books"), are usually printed on low-quality newsprint and can be anywhere from 200 to more than 850 pages thick. Manga magazines also contain one-shot comics and various four-panel yonkoma (equivalent to comic strips). Manga series can run for many years if they are successful. Popular shōnen magazines include Weekly Shōnen Jump, Weekly Shōnen Magazine and Weekly Shōnen Sunday. Popular shōjo manga include Ciao, Nakayoshi and Ribon. Manga artists sometimes start out with a few "one-shot" manga projects to make their name known. If these are successful and receive favorable reviews, they are continued. Magazines often have a short lifespan.

=== Collected volumes ===
After a series has run for a while, publishers often collect the chapters and print them in dedicated book-sized volumes, called tankōbon. These can be hardcover, or more usually softcover books, and are the equivalent of U.S. trade paperbacks or graphic novels. These volumes often use higher-quality paper, and are useful to those who want to "catch up" with a series so they can follow it in the magazines or if they find the cost of the weeklies or monthlies to be prohibitive. "Deluxe" versions have also been printed as readers have gotten older and the need for something special grew. Old manga have also been reprinted using somewhat lesser quality paper and sold for 100 yen (about $1 U.S. dollar) each to compete with the used book market.

==== History ====
Kanagaki Robun and Kawanabe Kyōsai created the first manga magazine in 1874: Eshinbun Nipponchi. The magazine was heavily influenced by Japan Punch, founded in 1862 by Charles Wirgman, a British cartoonist. Eshinbun Nipponchi had a very simple style of drawings and did not become popular with many people. Eshinbun Nipponchi ended after three issues. The magazine Kisho Shimbun in 1875 was inspired by Eshinbun Nipponchi, which was followed by Marumaru Chinbun in 1877, and then Garakuta Chinpo in 1879. Shōnen Sekai was the first shōnen magazine, created in 1895 by Iwaya Sazanami, a famous writer of Japanese children's literature. Shōnen Sekai had a strong focus on the First Sino-Japanese War.

In 1905, the manga-magazine publishing boom started with the Russo-Japanese War. During this time, Tokyo Pakku was created and became a huge hit. After Tokyo Pakku in 1905, a female version of Shōnen Sekai was created and named Shōjo Sekai, which is considered the first shōjo magazine. Shōnen Pakku was made and is considered the first children's manga magazine. The children's demographic was in an early stage of development in the Meiji period. Shōnen Pakku was influenced by foreign children's magazines such as Puck, which an employee of Jitsugyō no Nihon (publisher of the magazine) saw and decided to emulate. In 1924, Kodomo Pakku was launched as another children's manga magazine after Shōnen Pakku. During the boom, Poten (derived from the French "potin") was published in 1908. All the pages were in full color with influences from Tokyo Pakku and Osaka Puck. It is unknown if there were any more issues besides the first one. Kodomo Pakku was launched May 1924 by Tokyosha and featured high-quality art by many members of the manga industry like Takei Takeo, Takehisa Yumeji and Aso Yutaka. Some of the manga featured speech balloons, while manga from previous eras remained silent.

Published from May 1935 to January 1941, Manga no Kuni coincided with the period of the Second Sino-Japanese War (1937–1945). Manga no Kuni featured information on becoming a mangaka and on other comics industries around the world. Manga no Kuni handed its title to Sashie Manga Kenkyū in August 1940.

=== Dōjinshi ===
Dōjinshi, produced by small publishers outside of the mainstream commercial market, resemble in their publishing small-press independently published comic books in the United States. Comiket, the largest comic book convention in the world with around 500,000 visitors gathering over three days, is devoted to dōjinshi. While they most often contain original stories, many are parodies of or include characters from popular manga and anime series. Some dōjinshi continue with a series' story or write an entirely new one using its characters, much like fan fiction. In 2007, dōjinshi sales amounted to 27.73 billion yen (US$245 million). In 2006, they represented about a tenth of manga books and magazines sales.

== Digital manga ==
Thanks to the advent of the internet, there have been new ways for aspiring mangaka to upload and sell their manga online. Before, there were two main ways in which a mangaka's work could be published: taking their manga drawn on paper to a publisher themselves, or submitting their work to competitions run by magazines.

=== Web manga ===
In recent years, there has been a rise in manga released digitally. Web manga, as it is known in Japan, has seen an increase thanks in part to image hosting websites where anyone can upload pages from their works for free. Although released digitally, almost all web manga sticks to the conventional black-and-white format despite some never getting physical publication. Pixiv is the most popular site where amateur and professional work gets published on the site. It has grown to be the most visited site for artwork in Japan. Twitter has also become a popular place for web manga, with many artists releasing pages weekly on their accounts in the hope of their work getting picked up or published professionally. One of the best examples of an amateur work becoming professional is One-Punch Man, which was released online and later received a professional remake released digitally and an anime adaptation soon thereafter.

Many of the big print publishers have also released digital only magazines and websites where web manga get published alongside their serialized magazines. Shogakukan for instance has two websites, Sunday Webry and Ura Sunday, that release weekly chapters for web manga and even offer contests for mangaka to submit their work. Both Sunday Webry and Ura Sunday have become two of the top web manga sites in Japan. Some have even released apps that teach how to draw professional manga. Weekly Shōnen Jump released Jump Paint, an app that guides users on how to make their own manga, from making storyboards to digitally inking lines. It also offers more than 120 types of pen tips and more than 1,000 screentones for artists to practice. Kodansha has also used the popularity of web manga to launch more series and also offer better distribution of their officially translated works under Kodansha Comics, thanks in part to the titles being released digitally first before being published physically.

The rise of web manga has also been credited to smartphones and computers, as more and more readers read manga on their phones rather than from a print publication. While paper manga has seen a decrease over time, digital manga has been growing in sales each year. The Research Institute for Publications reports that sales of digital manga books excluding magazines jumped 27.1 percent to ¥146 billion in 2016 from the year before, while sales of paper manga saw a record year-on-year decline of 7.4 percent to ¥194.7 billion. They have also said that if the digital and paper keep the same growth and drop rates, web manga would exceed their paper counterparts. In 2020, manga sales topped the ¥600 billion mark for the first time in history, beating the 1995 peak due to a fast growth of the digital manga market, which rose by ¥82.7 billion from a previous year, surpassing print manga sales, which have also increased.

Of the total ¥704.3 billion domestic manga market in Japan in 2024, the digital segment accounted for ¥512.2 billion, excluding print editions.

=== Webtoons ===
While webtoons have caught on in popularity as a new medium for comics in Asia, Japan has been slow to adopt webtoons as the traditional format and print publication still dominates the way manga is created and consumed (although this is rapidly changing). Despite this, one of the biggest webtoon publishers in the world, Comico, has had success in the traditional Japanese manga market. Comico was launched by NHN Japan, the Japanese subsidiary of the Korean company NHN Entertainment. As of now, there are only two webtoon publishers that publish Japanese webtoons: Comico and Naver Webtoon (under the name XOY in Japan). Kakao has also had success by offering licensed manga and translated Korean webtoons with their service Piccoma. All three companies credit their success to the webtoon pay model, where users can purchase each chapter individually instead of having to buy the whole book while also offering some chapters for free for a period of time, allowing anyone to read a whole series for free if they wait long enough. The added benefit of having all of their titles in color and some with special animations and effects have also helped them succeed. Some popular Japanese webtoons have also gotten anime adaptations and print releases, the most notable being ReLIFE and Recovery of an MMO Junkie.

== International markets ==
By 2007, the influence of manga on international comics had grown considerably over the past two decades. "Influence" is used here to refer to effects on the comics markets outside Japan and to aesthetic effects on comics artists internationally.

The reading direction in a traditional manga

Traditionally, manga stories flow from top to bottom and from right to left. Most publishers of translated manga keep this original format, while a small number of publishers mirror the pages horizontally before printing the translation, changing the reading direction to a more "Western" left to right, so as not to confuse foreign readers or traditional comics-consumers. This practice is known as "flipping". For the most part, criticism suggests that flipping goes against the original intentions of the creator (for example, if a person wears a shirt that reads "MAY" on it, and gets flipped, then the word is altered to "YAM"), who may be unaware of how awkward it is to read comics when the eyes must flow through the pages and text in opposite directions, resulting in an experience that's quite distinct from reading something that flows homogeneously. If the translation is not adapted to the flipped artwork carefully enough, it is also possible for the text to go against the picture, such as a person referring to something on their left in the text while pointing to their right in the graphic. Characters shown writing with their right hands often become left-handed when a series is flipped. Flipping may also cause oddities with familiar asymmetrical objects or layouts, such as a car being depicted with the gas pedal on the left and the brake on the right, or a shirt with the buttons on the wrong side; however these issues are minor when compared to the unnatural reading flow, and some of them could be solved with an adaptation work that goes beyond just translation and blind flipping.

In April 2023, the Japan Business Federation laid out a proposal aiming to spur the economic growth of Japan by further promoting the contents industry abroad, primarily anime, manga and video games, for measures to invite industry experts from abroad to come to Japan to work, and to link with the tourism sector to help foreign fans of manga and anime visit sites across the country associated with particular manga stories. The federation seeks to quadruple the sales of Japanese content in overseas markets within the upcoming 10 years. The increasing globalization of the manga industry has led to Japanese publishers inviting artists from other countries.

=== Asia ===
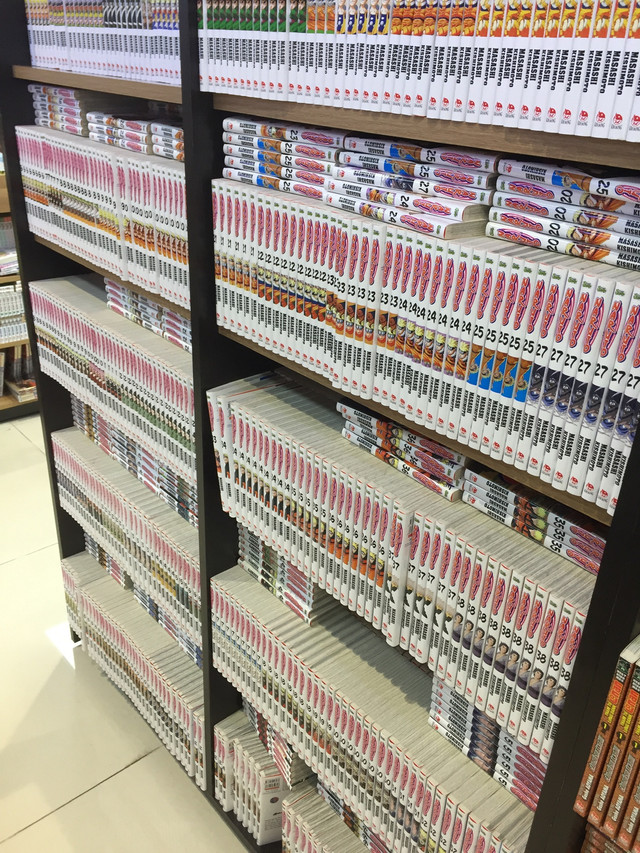
Manga shelf in "Kim Đồng" bookstore, Hanoi, Vietnam

Manga has highly influenced the art styles of manhwa and manhua. Manga in Indonesia is published by Elex Media Komputindo, Level Comic, M&C and Gramedia. Manga has influenced Indonesia's original comic industry. Manga in the Philippines were imported from the US and were sold only in specialty stores and in limited copies. The first manga translated in the Filipino language was Doraemon, which was published by J-Line Comics and was then followed by Case Closed. In 2015, yaoi (boys' love) manga became popular through the introduction of BL manga by printing company BLACKink. Among the first BL titles to be printed were Poster Boy, Tagila, and Sprinters, all which were written in Filipino. BL manga have become bestsellers in the top three bookstore companies in the Philippines since their introduction in 2015. During the same year, yaoi manga became a popular mainstream with Thai consumers, leading to television series adapted from BL manga stories since 2016. Manga piracy is an increasing problem in Asia that affects many publishers. This has led to the Japanese government taking legal action against multiple operators of pirate websites. Manga has become increasingly popular in Southeast Asia being one the main assets of Japan's soft power in the region. Since the start of the 2020s, manga sales have also significantly increased in India.

=== Europe ===
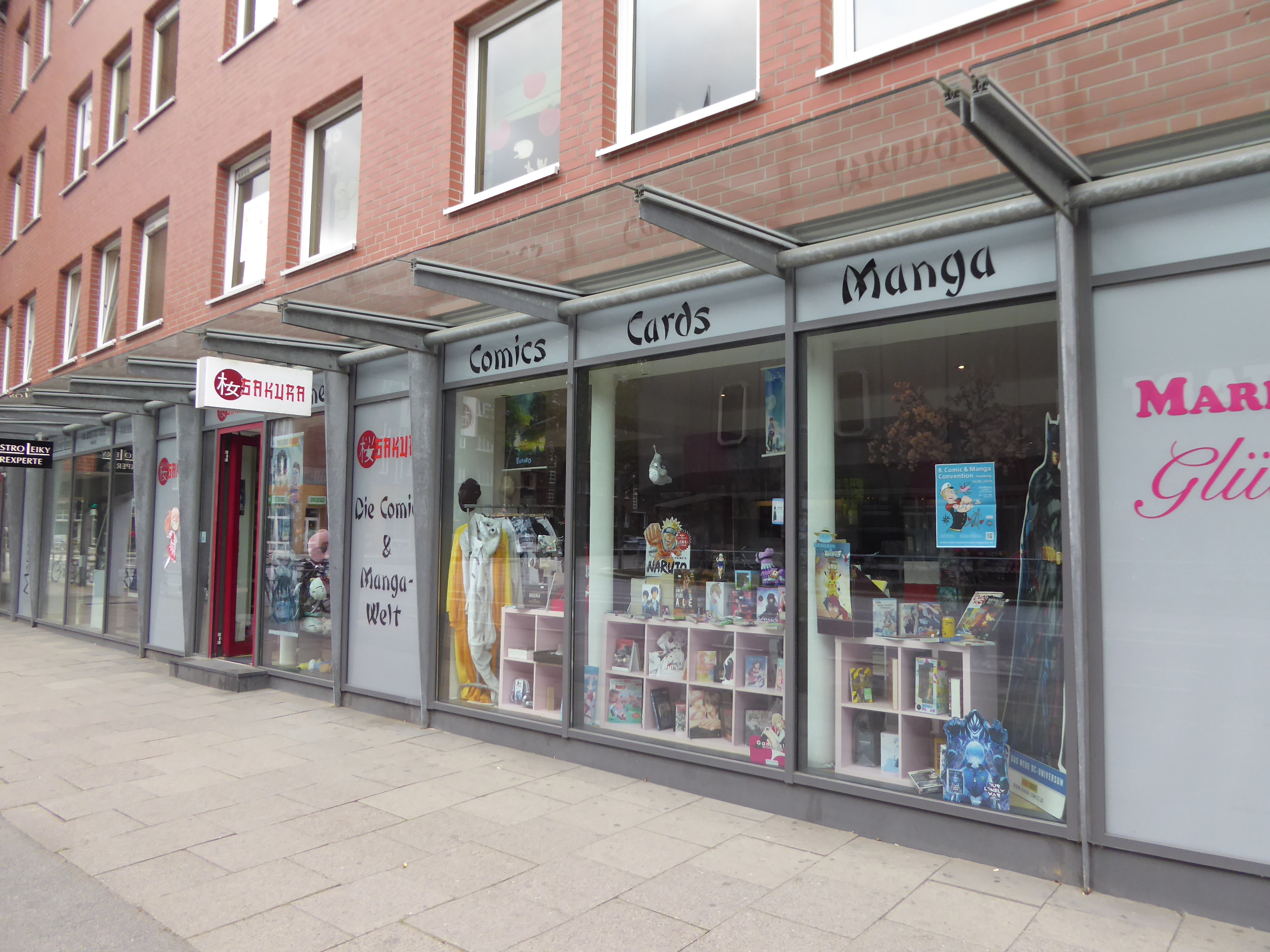
The comic book and manga store Sakura Eldorado in Hamburg, Germany

Manga has influenced European cartooning in a way that is somewhat different from in the U.S. Broadcast anime in France and Italy opened the European market to manga during the 1970s. French art has borrowed from Japan since the 19th century (Japonism) and has its own highly developed tradition of bande dessinée cartooning. Manga was introduced to France in the late 1990s, where Japanese pop culture became massively popular; in 2021, 55% of comics sold in the country were manga, with France being the biggest manga importer.

By mid-2021, 75 percent of the €300 value of Culture Pass accounts given to French 18 year-olds was spent on manga. According to the Japan External Trade Organization, sales of manga reached $212.6 million within France and Germany alone in 2006. France represents about 50% of the European market and is the second largest manga market, behind Japan. In 2013, there were 41 publishers of manga in France and, together with other Asian comics, manga represented around 40% of new comics releases in the country, surpassing Franco-Belgian comics for the first time. European publishers marketing manga translated into French include Asuka, Casterman, Glénat, Kana, and Pika Édition, among others. European publishers also translate manga into Dutch, German, Italian, and other languages. In 2007, about 70% of all comics sold in Germany were manga. Since 2010, the country celebrates Manga Day on every 27 August. In 2021, manga sales in Germany rose by 75% from its original record of 70 million in 2005. As of 2022, Germany is the third largest manga market in Europe after Italy and France.

In 2021, the Spanish manga market hit a record of 1,033 new title publications. In 2022 the 28th edition of the Barcelona Manga Festival opened its doors to more than 163,000 fans, compared to a pre-pandemic 120,000 in 2019.

Manga publishers based in the United Kingdom include Gollancz and Titan Books. Manga publishers from the United States have a strong marketing presence in the United Kingdom: for example, the Tanoshimi line from Random House. In 2019, The British Museum held a mass exhibition dedicated to manga.

The Europe manga market size was estimated at USD 676.1 million in 2023 and is expected to grow at a CAGR of 19.6% from 2024 to 2030.

=== United States ===
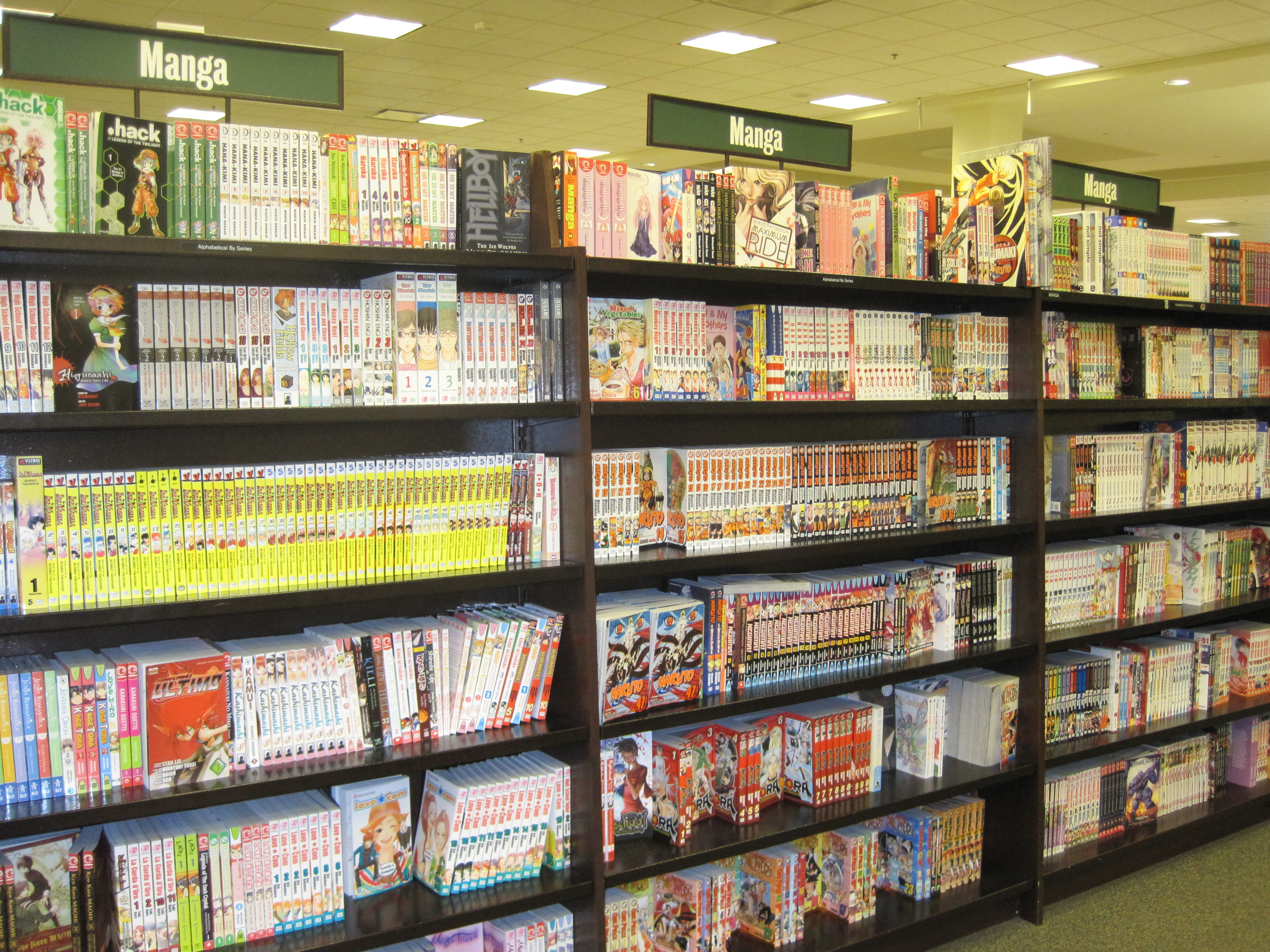
The manga section at Barnes & Noble in San Bruno, California

Manga made its way only gradually into U.S. markets, first in association with anime and then independently. Some U.S. fans became aware of manga in the 1970s and early 1980s. However, anime was initially more accessible than manga to U.S. fans, many of whom were college-age young people who found it easier to obtain, subtitle, and exhibit video tapes of anime than translate, reproduce, and distribute tankōbon-style manga books. One of the first manga translated into English and marketed in the U.S. was Keiji Nakazawa's Barefoot Gen, an autobiographical story of the atomic bombing of Hiroshima issued by Leonard Rifas and Educomics (1980–1982). More manga were translated between the mid-1980s and 1990s, including Golgo 13 in 1986, Lone Wolf and Cub from First Comics in 1987, and Kamui, Area 88, and Mai the Psychic Girl, also in 1987 and all from Viz Media-Eclipse Comics. Others soon followed, including Akira from Marvel Comics' Epic Comics imprint, Nausicaä of the Valley of the Wind from Viz Media, Appleseed from Eclipse Comics in 1988, and later Iczer-1 (Antarctic Press, 1994) and Ippongi Bang's F-111 Bandit (Antarctic Press, 1995).

During the 1980s and 1990s, Japanese animation, such as Akira, Dragon Ball, Neon Genesis Evangelion, and Pokémon, made a larger impact on the fan experience and in the market than manga. Matters changed when translator-entrepreneur Toren Smith founded Studio Proteus in 1986. Smith and Studio Proteus acted as agents and translators of many Japanese manga, including Masamune Shirow's Appleseed and Kōsuke Fujishima's Oh My Goddess!, for Dark Horse and Eros Comix, eliminating the need for these publishers to seek their own contacts in Japan. Simultaneously, the Japanese publisher Shogakukan opened a U.S. market initiative with their U.S. subsidiary Viz, enabling Viz to draw directly on Shogakukan's catalogue and translation skills.

Japanese publishers began pursuing a U.S. market in the mid-1990s, due to a stagnation in the domestic market for manga. The U.S. manga market took an upturn, with mid-1990s anime and manga versions of Masamune Shirow's Ghost in the Shell (translated by Frederik L. Schodt and Toren Smith) becoming very popular among fans. An extremely successful manga and anime translated and dubbed in English in the mid-1990s was Sailor Moon. By 1995–1998, the Sailor Moon manga had been exported to over 23 countries, including China, Brazil, Mexico, Australia, North America and most of Europe. In 1997, Mixx Entertainment began publishing Sailor Moon, along with CLAMP's Magic Knight Rayearth, Hitoshi Iwaaki's Parasyte and Tsutomu Takahashi's Ice Blade in the monthly manga magazine MixxZine. Mixx Entertainment, later renamed Tokyopop, also published manga in trade paperbacks and, like Viz, began aggressive marketing of manga to both young male and female demographics.

During this period, Dark Horse Manga was a major publisher of translated manga. In addition to Oh My Goddess!, the company published Akira, Astro Boy, Berserk, Blade of the Immortal, Ghost in the Shell, Lone Wolf and Cub, Yasuhiro Nightow's Trigun and Blood Blockade Battlefront, Gantz, Kouta Hirano's Hellsing and Drifters, Blood+, Multiple Personality Detective Psycho, FLCL, Mob Psycho 100, and Oreimo. The company received 13 Eisner Award nominations for its manga titles, and three of the four manga creators admitted to The Will Eisner Award Hall of Fame — Osamu Tezuka, Kazuo Koike, and Goseki Kojima — were published in Dark Horse translations.

In the following years, manga became increasingly popular, and new publishers entered the field while the established publishers greatly expanded their catalogues. The Pokémon manga Electric Tale of Pikachu issue #1 sold over 1 million copies in the United States, making it the best-selling single comic book in the United States since 1993. By 2008, the U.S. and Canadian manga market generated $175 million in annual sales. Simultaneously, mainstream U.S. media began to discuss manga, with articles in The New York Times, Time magazine, The Wall Street Journal, and Wired magazine. As of 2017, manga distributor Viz Media was the largest publisher of graphic novels and comic books in the United States, with a 23% share of the market. BookScan sales show that manga is one of the fastest-growing areas of the comic book and narrative fiction markets. From January 2019 to May 2019, the manga market grew 16%, compared to the overall comic book market's 5% growth. The NPD Group noted that, compared to other comic book readers, manga readers are younger (76% under 30) and more diverse, including a higher female readership (16% higher than other comic books). As of January 2020, manga is the second largest category in the US comic book and graphic novel market, accounting for 27% of the entire market share. During the COVID-19 pandemic, some stores of the American bookseller Barnes & Noble saw up to a 500% increase in sales from graphic novel and manga sales due to younger generations showing a high interest in the medium. Sales of print manga titles in the U.S. increased by 3.6 million units in the first quarter of 2021 compared to the same period in 2020. In 2021, 24.4 million units of manga were sold in the United States. This represented an increase of about 15 million (160%) more sales than in 2020. In 2022, most of the top-selling comic creators in the United States were mangaka. The same year, manga sales saw an increase of 9%. In 2023, manga sales amounted to a value of $381.16 million USD, with 57% of all titles sold coming from Viz Media.

== Localized manga ==
A number of artists in the United States have drawn comics and cartoons influenced by manga. As an early example, Vernon Grant drew manga-influenced comics while living in Japan in the late 1960s and early 1970s. Others include Frank Miller's mid-1980s Ronin, Adam Warren and Toren Smith's 1988 The Dirty Pair, and Ben Dunn's 1987 Ninja High School and Manga Shi 2000 from Crusade Comics (1997).

By the beginning of the 21st century, several U.S. manga publishers had begun to produce work by U.S. artists under the broad marketing-label of manga. In 2002, I.C. Entertainment (formerly Studio Ironcat and now out of business) launched a series of manga by U.S. artists called Amerimanga. In 2004, eigoMANGA launched the Rumble Pak and Sakura Pakk anthology series. Seven Seas Entertainment followed suit with World Manga. Simultaneously, TokyoPop introduced original English-language manga (OEL manga), later renamed Global Manga.

Francophone artists have also developed their own versions of manga, called manfra, like Frédéric Boilet's la nouvelle manga. Boilet has worked in France and in Japan, sometimes collaborating with Japanese artists.

== Awards ==
The Japanese manga industry grants a large number of awards, mostly sponsored by publishers, with the winning prize usually including publication of the winning stories in magazines released by the sponsoring publisher. Examples of these awards include:

- The Akatsuka Award for comedy manga
- The Dengeki Comic Grand Prix for one-shot manga
- The Japan Cartoonists Association Award (multiple genres)
- The Kodansha Manga Award (multiple genres)
- The Seiun Award for best science fiction comic of the year
- The Shogakukan Manga Award (multiple genres)
- The Tezuka Award for best new serial manga
- The Tezuka Osamu Cultural Prize (multiple genres)

The Japanese Ministry of Foreign Affairs has awarded the International Manga Award annually since May 2007.

In 2024, LeftField Media (creators of the annual event Anime NYC), in cooperation with Japan Society, created an awards program to honor manga creators with work available in English.

- The American Manga Awards (multiple genres)

== University education ==
Kyoto Seika University in Japan has offered a highly competitive course in manga since 2000. Following this, several established universities and vocational schools (専門学校, senmon gakkō) established training curriculums nationwide.

Shuho Sato, who wrote Umizaru and Say Hello to Black Jack, created some controversy on Twitter when he said that manga school was, "meaningless because those schools have very low success rates. Then, I could teach novices required skills on the job in three months. Meanwhile, those school students spend several million yen, and four years, yet they are good for nothing." and that, "For instance, Keiko Takemiya, the then professor of Seika Univ., remarked in the Government Council that 'A complete novice will be able to understand where is "Tachikiri" (i.e., margin section) during four years.' On the other hand, I would imagine that, it takes about thirty minutes to completely understand that at work."

== See also ==
- ACG (subculture)
- Alternative manga
- Anime and manga fandom
- Chibi (cuter, smaller character stylization)
- Cinema of Japan
- Cool Japan
- E-toki (horizontal, illustrated narrative form)
- Japanese popular culture
- Light novel
- List of best-selling manga
- List of films based on manga
- List of manga distributors
- Soft power § Japan
- Manhua
- Manhwa
- Truyện tranh
- Visual novel
