= Tokyo Puck =

Japanese satirical magazine

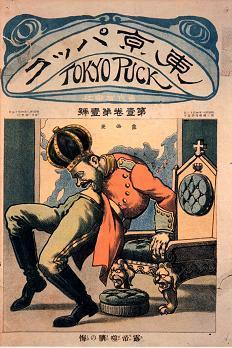
Front cover of Tokyo Puck magazine

Tokyo Puck (Japanese: 東京パック, Hepburn: Tōkyō pakku) was a Japanese satirical comic magazine launched in 1905. It was based on the American Puck and featured multicolor illustrations that emphasized visual characteristics. It was the first publication of its kind in Japan to feature color illustrations. The magazine existed until 1923 with an interruption between 1912 and 1919.

== History and profile ==
Tokyo Puck first published in 1905. Early on it was critical of the government and several issues were prohibited from being published, but after the High Treason Incident of 1910, it became more conservative and focused more on the changes in daily life.

The editor-in-chief was Kitazawa Rakuten, the first professional cartoonist in Japan and considered the founding father of modern manga. The magazine was translated into English and Chinese and sold in not only Japan but also in the Korean peninsula, Mainland China, and Taiwan. Kitazawa Rakuten worked for the magazine until 1912 when it was temporarily folded. It was restarted in 1919, but permanently closed down in 1923.

Woodblock print artist Senpan Maekawa worked as an illustrator for the magazine early in his career.

== Archives ==
Full collections of Tokyo Puck is at Fukkoku.net as well as Google Arts & Culture. There also in the Ohio State University. and in the Guinness Book or World Records as the first Manga Magazine.

== See also ==
- Osaka Puck

== Other links ==
Th Melikian Collection

Google Arts & Culture ”Tokyo Puck”, Vol.25, No.2, "Tokyo Puck", Vol.1, No.8
