= Frank A. Nankivell =

Australian artist and political cartoonist

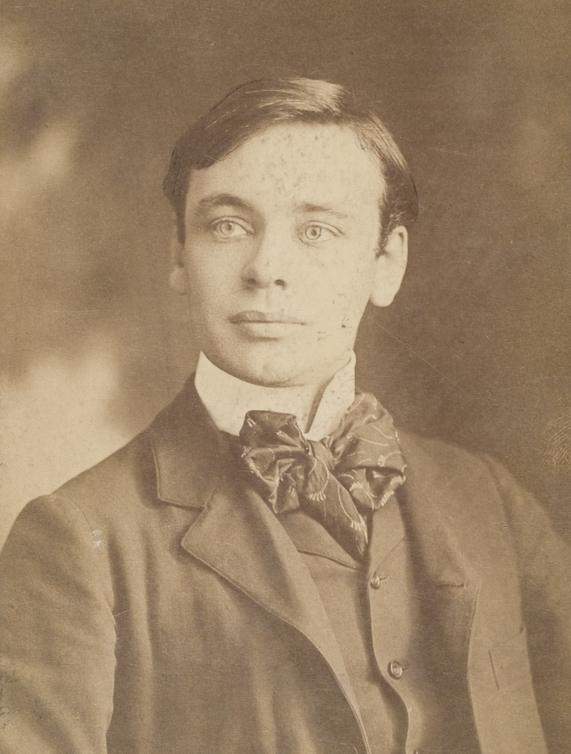
- Nankivell c. 1890
- Known for: Cartooning
- Notable work: Puck

Frank Arthur Nankivell (1869–1959) was an Australian artist and political cartoonist, known for his caricatures in publications such as Puck.

== Early life ==
Nankivell was born to John and Annie Nankivell in Maldon, northwest of Castlemaine, Victoria in April, 1869. He was a book illustrator in New York circles of the 1910s and 1920s on such publications as Puck, which was America's first successful humor magazine. He married Ada J. King in 1899 and had 2 children. She died in 1919. He then married Blanche Elizabeth Martin. The couple had two sons; John (1921–2012) m. Margaret Elizabeth Kreidler, and Ronald (1922–1971) m. Jean Denise McNulty.

Nankivell died in 1959.

== Education ==
Nankivell studied art at Wesley College, Melbourne. He later travelled to Japan and earned a living as a cartoonist in Tokyo where he made the acquaintance of Rakuten Kitazawa, who later became father of the Japanese comic art now known as manga. Nankivell left Japan in 1894 to study art in San Francisco. He left for New York in 1896 where he worked on magazines as a popular and influential cartoonist devoting his work mainly to social subjects and to state and federal political issues. Nankivell later became a member of the New York Circumnavigators Club, which was open only to those who had circumnavigated the globe longitudinally, by land and/or sea. Other members included Ernest Hemingway and Harry Houdini.

== Works ==
Several examples of his work are held in the collections of The Smithsonian in Washington DC. He was a large influence on the Japanese manga artist Rakuten Kitazawa.

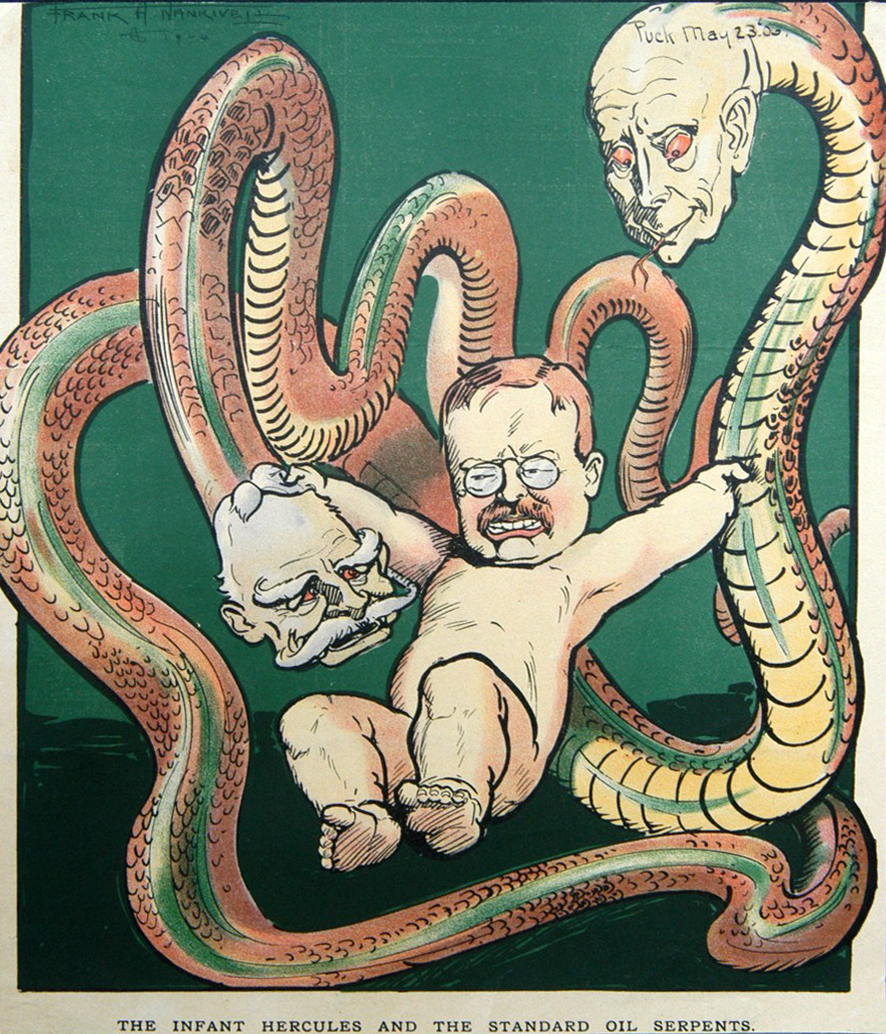
1906 caricature of Teddy Roosevelt

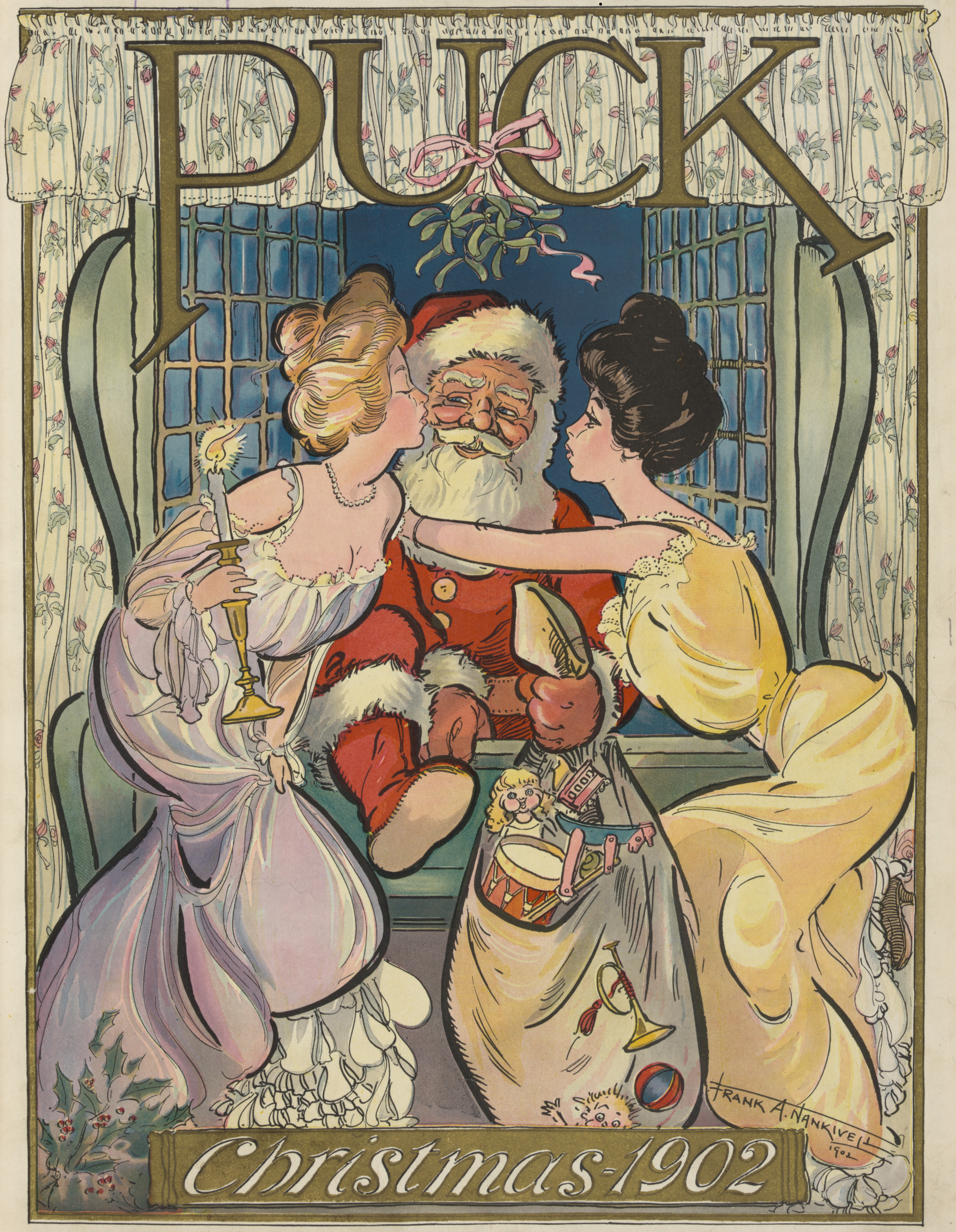
Christmas, 1902 cover of Puck

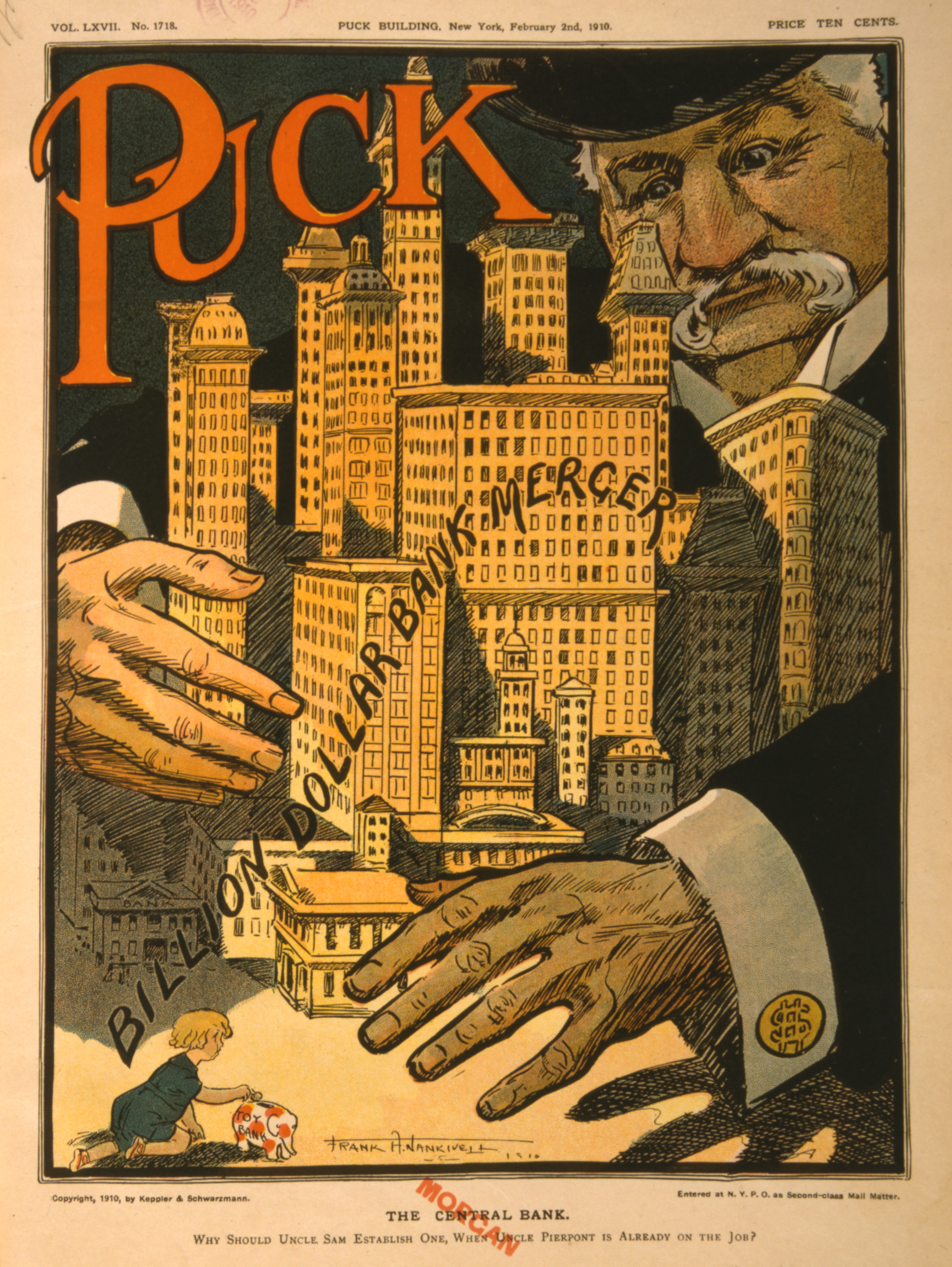
1910 caricature of J. P. Morgan
