= Puck (magazine) =

American humor magazine (1876–1918)

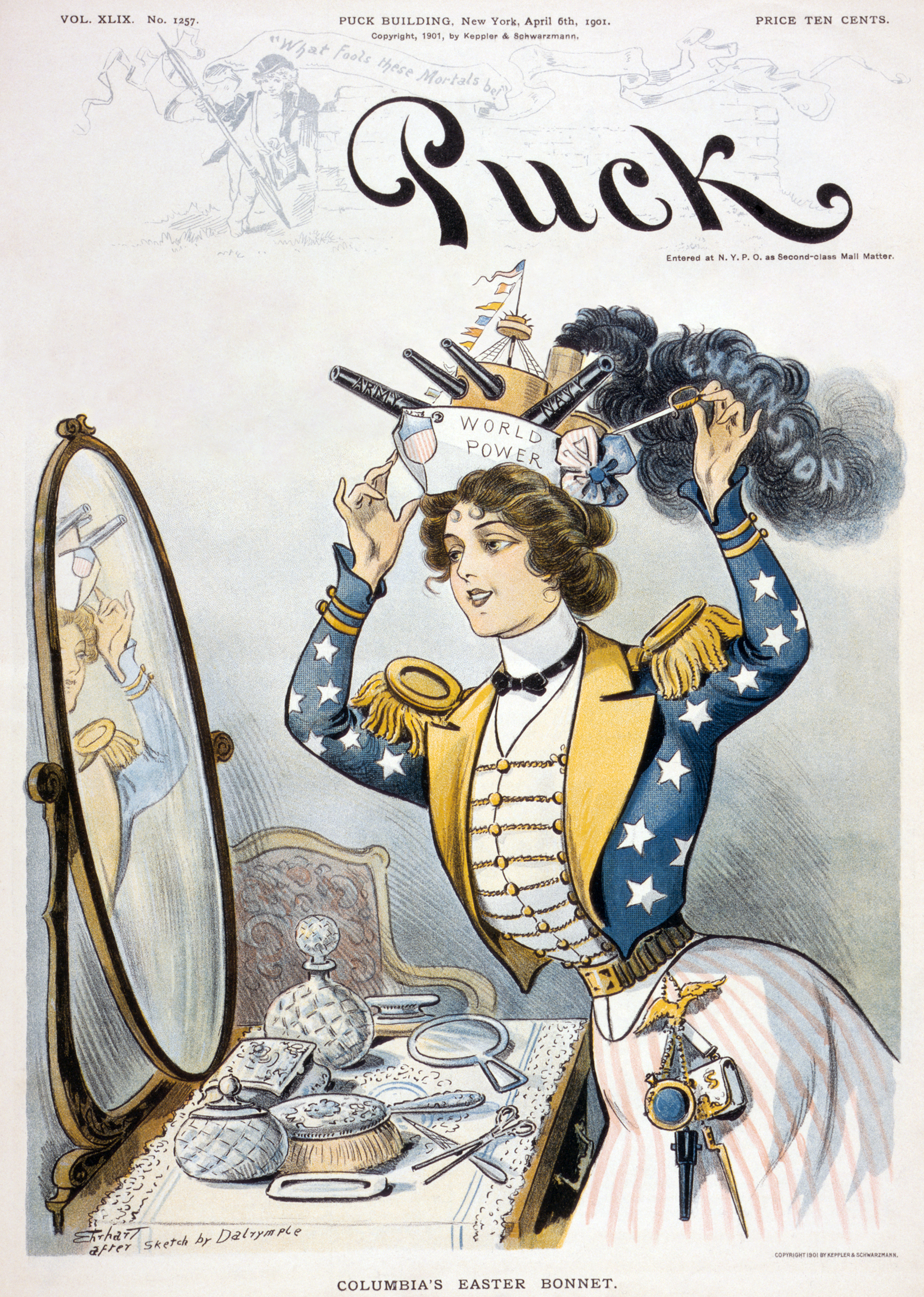
- Cover of Puck (April 6, 1901): Columbia wearing a warship bearing the words "World Power" as her "Easter bonnet"
- Editor: Henry Cuyler Bunner (1877–1896); Harry Leon Wilson (1896–1902); Joseph Keppler Jr. (1902–1918)
- Categories: Humor
- Frequency: Weekly
- Publisher: William Randolph Hearst (1916–1918)
- Founder: Joseph Keppler (1876–1894); Adolph Schwarzmann (1876–1904)
- First issue: German-language edition (1876; 150 years ago); English-language edition (1877; 149 years ago)
- Final issue: September 5, 1918; 108 years ago
- Country: United States
- Based in: St. Louis, later New York City
- Language: German; English

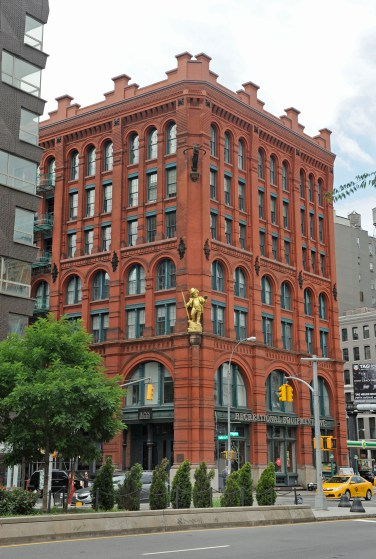
The Puck Building in Manhattan, New York City

Puck was the first successful humor magazine in the United States of colorful cartoons, caricatures and political satire of the issues of the day. It was founded in 1876 as a German-language publication by Joseph Keppler, an Austrian immigrant cartoonist and Adolph Schwarzmann, a German businessman, co-founder and financial backer. Puck's first English-language edition was published in 1877, covering issues like New York City's Tammany Hall, presidential politics, and social issues of the late 19th century to the early 20th century.

"Puckish" means "childishly mischievous". This led Shakespeare's Puck character (from A Midsummer Night's Dream) to be recast as a charming near-naked boy and used as the title of the magazine. Puck was the first magazine to carry illustrated advertising and the first to successfully adopt full-color lithography printing for a weekly publication.

Puck was published from 1876 until 1918.

== Publication history ==
After working with Leslie's Illustrated Weekly in New York – a well-established magazine at the time – Keppler and partner Adolph Schwarzmann (who also work at the same publication), created a satirical magazine called Puck. The weekly magazine was founded by Keppler in St. Louis, Missouri. Keppler and Schwarzmann had begun publishing German-language periodicals in 1869, though failed in 1871, he attempted another cartoon weekly with the same name, Puck. Which lasted until August 1872. Then in 1876, he again began publishing in the same name, and in German. Interested backers wanted Puck in English so he published it in both languages for 15 years until he ceased the German version.

In 1877, after gaining wide support for an English version of Puck, Keppler Joseph Keppler and his business partner Adolph Schwarzmann published its first issue in English. The first English edition was 16 pages long and was sold for 16 cents.

Sometime before 1887, Puck moved its editorial offices from St. Louis to New York City.

In May 1893, Puck Press published A Selection of Cartoons from Puck by Joseph Keppler (1877–1892) featuring 56 cartoons chosen by Keppler as his best work. Also during 1893, Keppler temporarily moved to Chicago and published a smaller-format, 12-page version of Puck from the Chicago World's Fair grounds. Shortly thereafter, Joseph Keppler died, and Henry Cuyler Bunner, editor of Puck since 1877 continued the magazine until his own death in 1896. Harry Leon Wilson replaced Bunner and remained editor until he resigned in 1902. Joseph Keppler Jr. then became the editor.

The English-language magazine continued in operation for more than 40 years under several owners and editors, until it was bought by the William Randolph Hearst company in 1916 (ironically, one 1906 cartoon mocked Hearst's bid for Congress with his newspapers' cartoon characters). The Hearst conglomerate discontinued the political material and switched to fine art and social fads. Within 2 years, subscriptions fell off and Hearst stopped publication; the final edition was distributed on September 5, 1918.

=== London edition ===
A London edition of Puck was published between January 1889 and June 1890. Among contributors was the English cartoonist and political satirist Tom Merry.

== Content ==
The magazine consisted of 16 pages measuring 10 inches by 13.5 inches with front and back covers in color and a color double-page centerfold. The cover always quoted Puck saying, "What fools these mortals be!" The jaunty symbol of Puck is conceived as a putto in a top hat who admires himself in a hand-mirror. He appears not only on the magazine covers but over the entrance to the Puck Building in New York's Nolita neighborhood, where the magazine was published, as well.

Puck gained notoriety for its witty, humorous cartoons and was the first to publish weekly cartoons using chromolithography in place of wood engraving, offering three cartoons instead of one. In its early years of publication, Puck's cartoons were largely printed in black and white, though later editions featured colorful, eye-catching lithographic prints in vivid color. A typical 32-page issue contained a full-color political cartoon on the front cover and a color non-political cartoon or comic strip on the back cover. There was always a double-page color centerfold, usually on a political topic. There were numerous black-and-white cartoons used to illustrate humorous anecdotes. A page of editorials commented on the issues of the day, and the last few pages were devoted to advertisements.

The Raven An 1890 Puck cartoon depicts President Benjamin Harrison at his desk wearing his grandfather's hat which is too big for his head, suggesting that he is not fit for the presidency. Atop a bust of William Henry Harrison, a raven with the head of Secretary of State James G. Blaine gawks down at the President, a reference to the famous Edgar Allan Poe poem "The Raven". Blaine and Harrison were at odds over the recently proposed McKinley Tariff.

=== Anti-Catholicism ===
The magazine was founded by German immigrants who were sympathetic to Otto von Bismarck who launched a major Kulturkampf against the Catholic Church in Germany. Puck especially targeted Irish Catholics in New York City, where they controlled Tammany Hall. According to historian Samuel Thomas, himself a Catholic:

[I]n an age of partisan politics and partisan journalism, Puck became the nation's premier journal of graphic humor and political satire, played an important role as a non-partisan crusader for good government and the triumph of American constitutional ideals. Its prime targets, however, were not just corrupt machine politicians. The magazine included as well ...[the] political agenda of the Catholic Church, especially its new Pope, Leo XIII....Tammany Hall... was all the more dangerous to Puck because, beginning in the 1870s, Irish Catholics dominated it.... In cartoons and editorials spanning two decades, the magazine blasted and often conjoined both Tammany and the papacy with invidious comparisons that left few readers in doubt as to their sympathies.

== Contributors ==
Over the years, Puck employed many early cartoonists of note, including, Louis Dalrymple, Bernhard Gillam, Friedrich Graetz, Livingston Hopkins, Frederick Burr Opper, Louis Glackens, Albert Levering, Frank Nankivell, J. S. Pughe, Rose O'Neill, Charles Taylor, James Albert Wales, and Eugene Zimmerman.

== Puck Building ==
Puck was housed from 1887 in the landmark Chicago-style, Romanesque Revival Puck Building at Lafayette and Houston streets, New York City. The steel-frame building was designed by architects Albert and Herman Wagner in 1885, as the world's largest lithographic presswork under a single roof, with its own electricity-generating dynamo. It takes up a full block on Houston Street, bounded by Lafayette and Mulberry streets.

== Legacy ==
Years after its conclusion, the "Puck" name and slogan were revived as part of the Comic Weekly Sunday comic section that ran on Hearst's newspaper chain beginning in September 1931 and continuing until the 1970s. It was then revived again by Hearst's Los Angeles Herald Examiner, which folded in 1989.

== Archives ==
A collection of Puck cartoons dating from 1879 to 1903 is maintained by the Special Collections Research Center within the Gelman Library of The George Washington University. The Library of Congress also has an extensive collection of Puck Magazine prints online. The Florida Atlantic University Libraries Special Collections Department also maintains a collection of both English and German edition Puck cartoons dating from 1878 to 1916.

The complete collection of Puck magazine's issues, digitized in black and white, can be accessed through the Internet Archives.

== Gallery of Puck cartoons ==
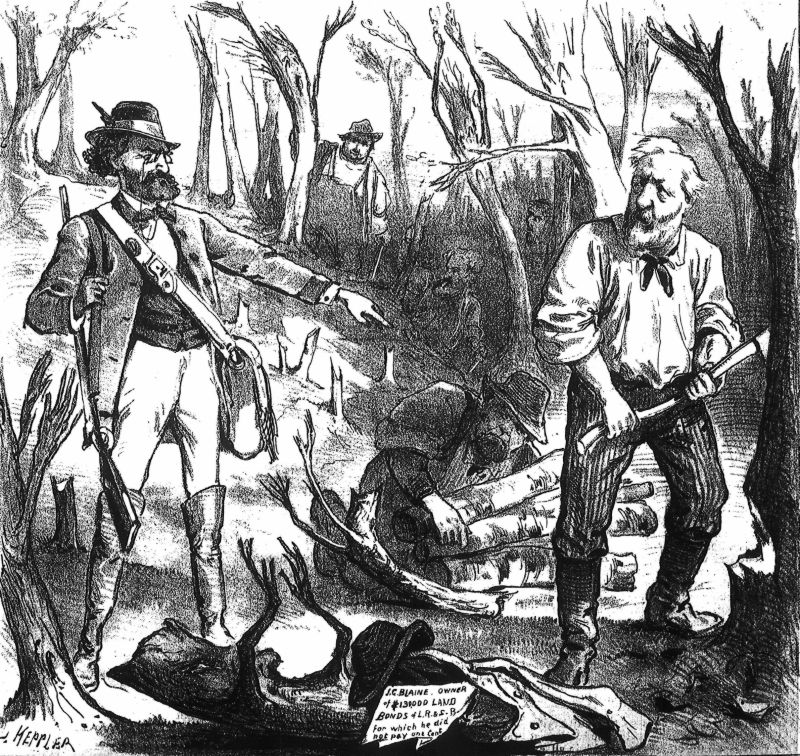
U.S. Secretary of the Interior Carl Schurz accosts Senator James G. Blaine chopping down a tree in the forest, c. 1878

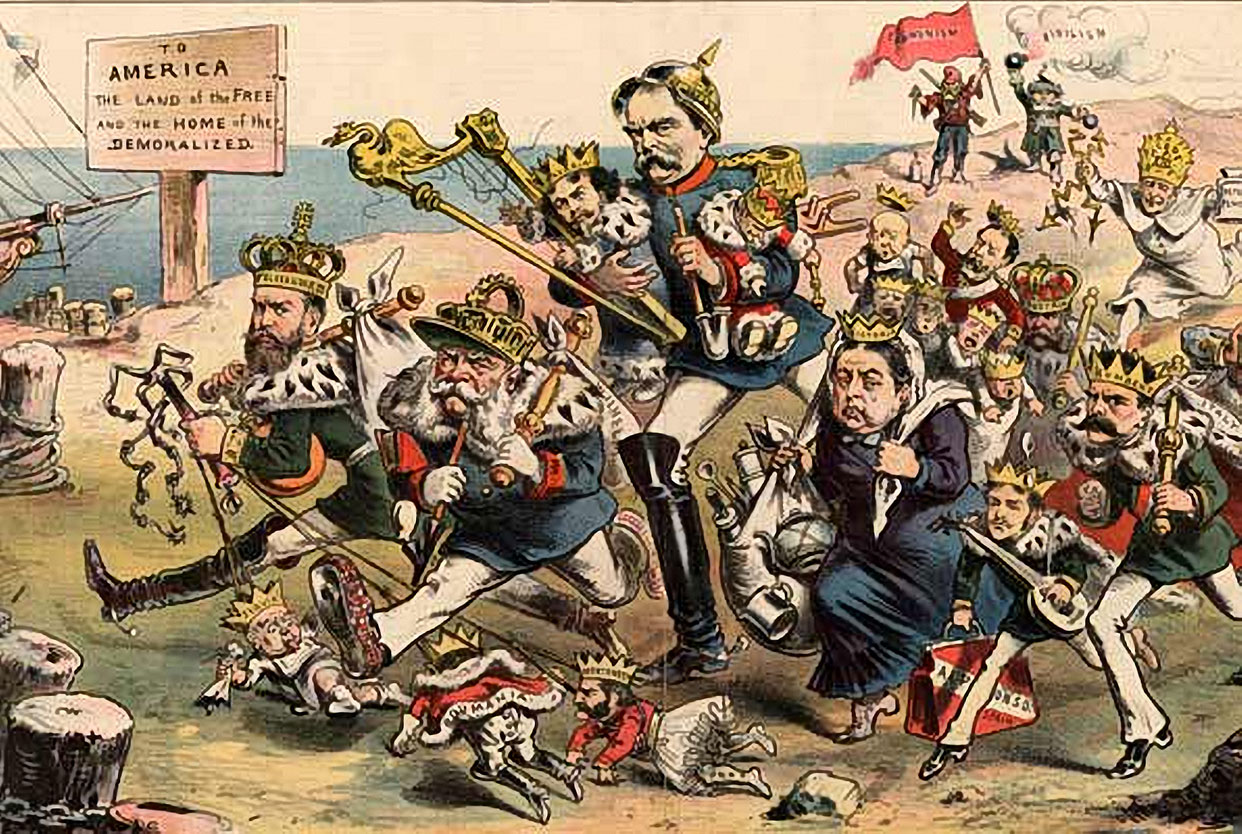
European Royalties: Go West! (after assassination of Alexander II of Russia), March 30, 1881

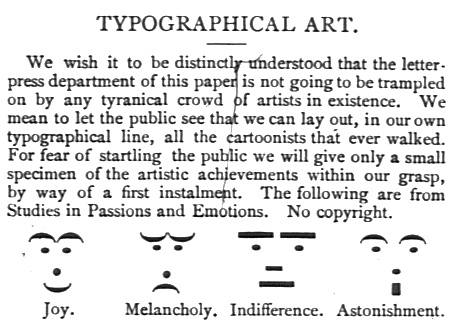
Emoticons, March 30, 1881

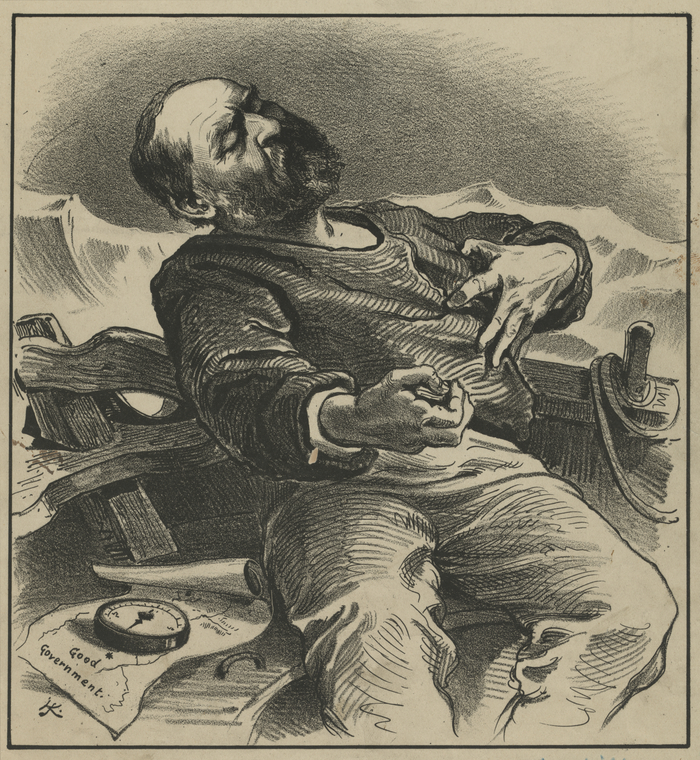
President James A. Garfield, Auf seinem Posten gefällt, July 6, 1881

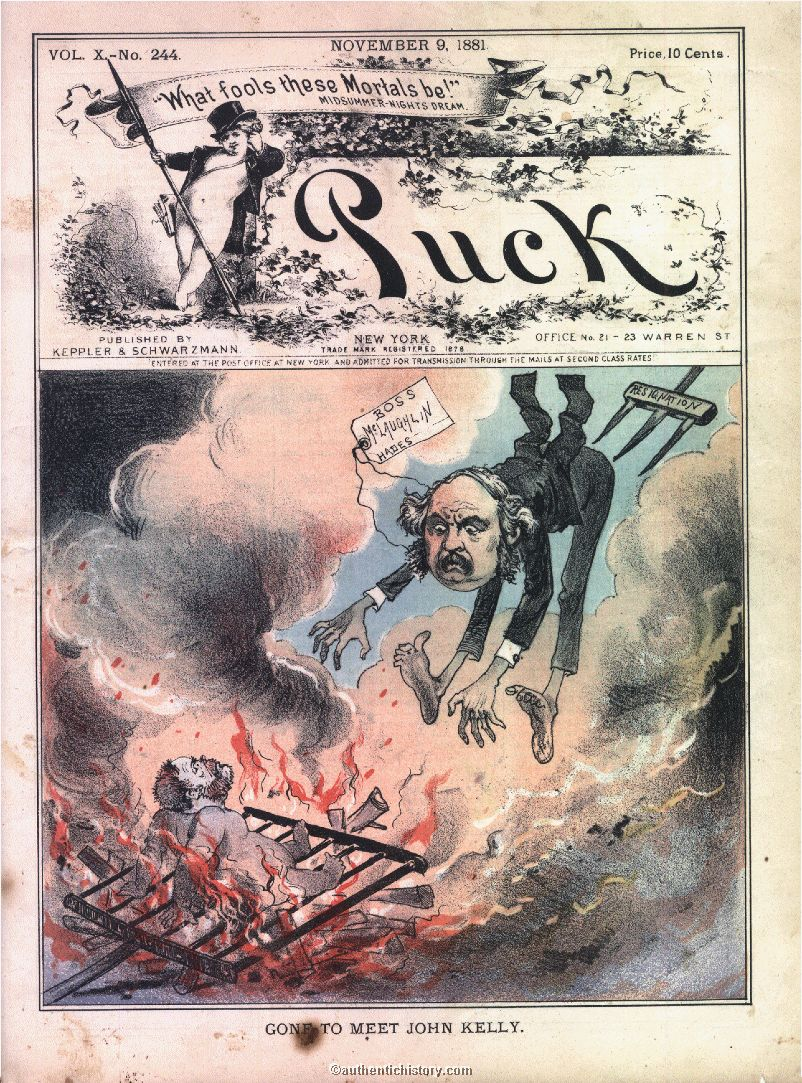
Gone to meet John Kelly (Hugh McLaughlin, the Irish Catholic political "boss" of Brooklyn) being deposited in "Hades" (hell), November 9, 1881 cover

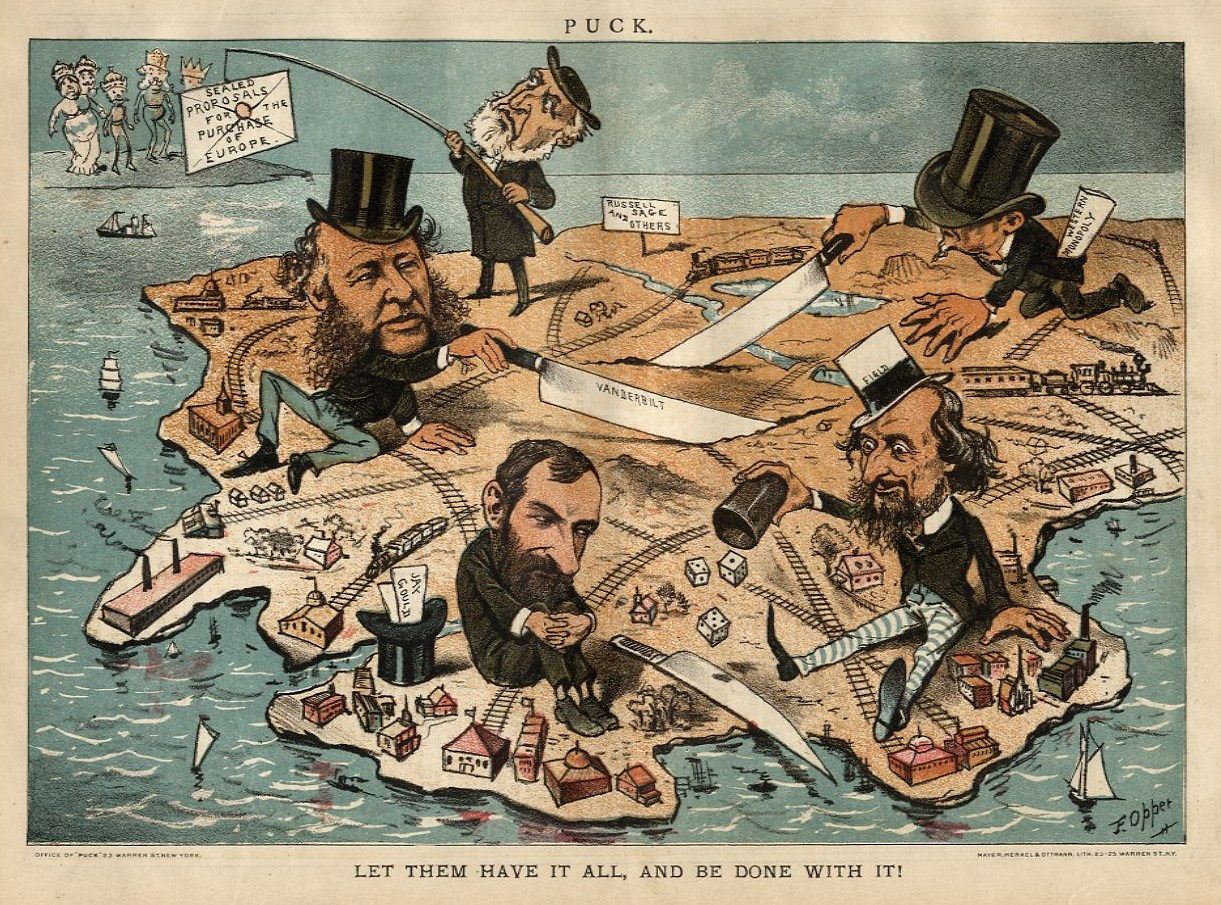
German edition: Monopoly Millionaires Dividing the Country (William Henry Vanderbilt, Jay Gould, Cyrus West Field, Russell Sage; Andrew Carnegie), 1885

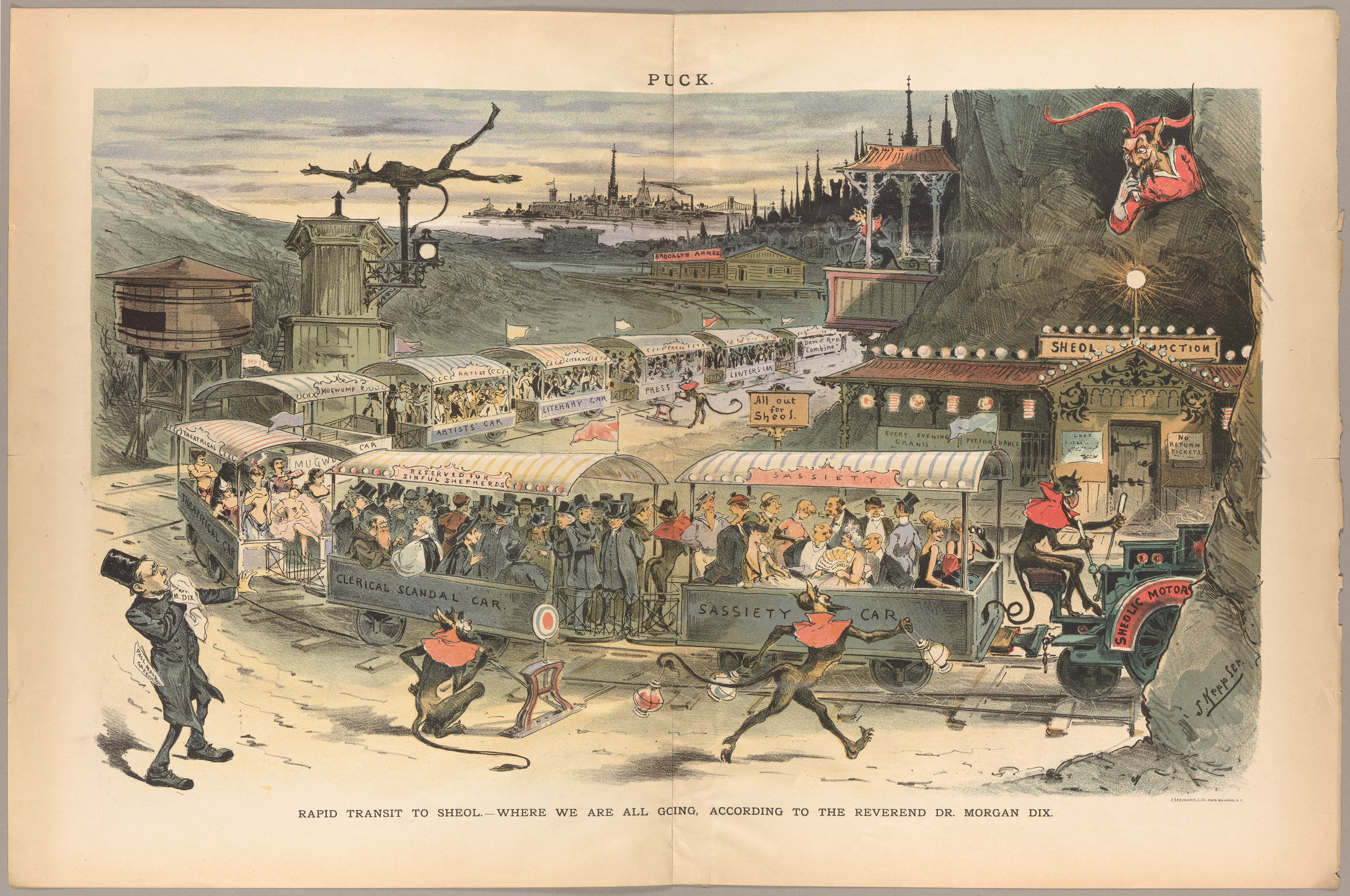
Rapid Transit to Sheol—Where We Are All Going According to the Reverend Dr. Morgan Dix by Joseph Ferdinand Keppler, 1888

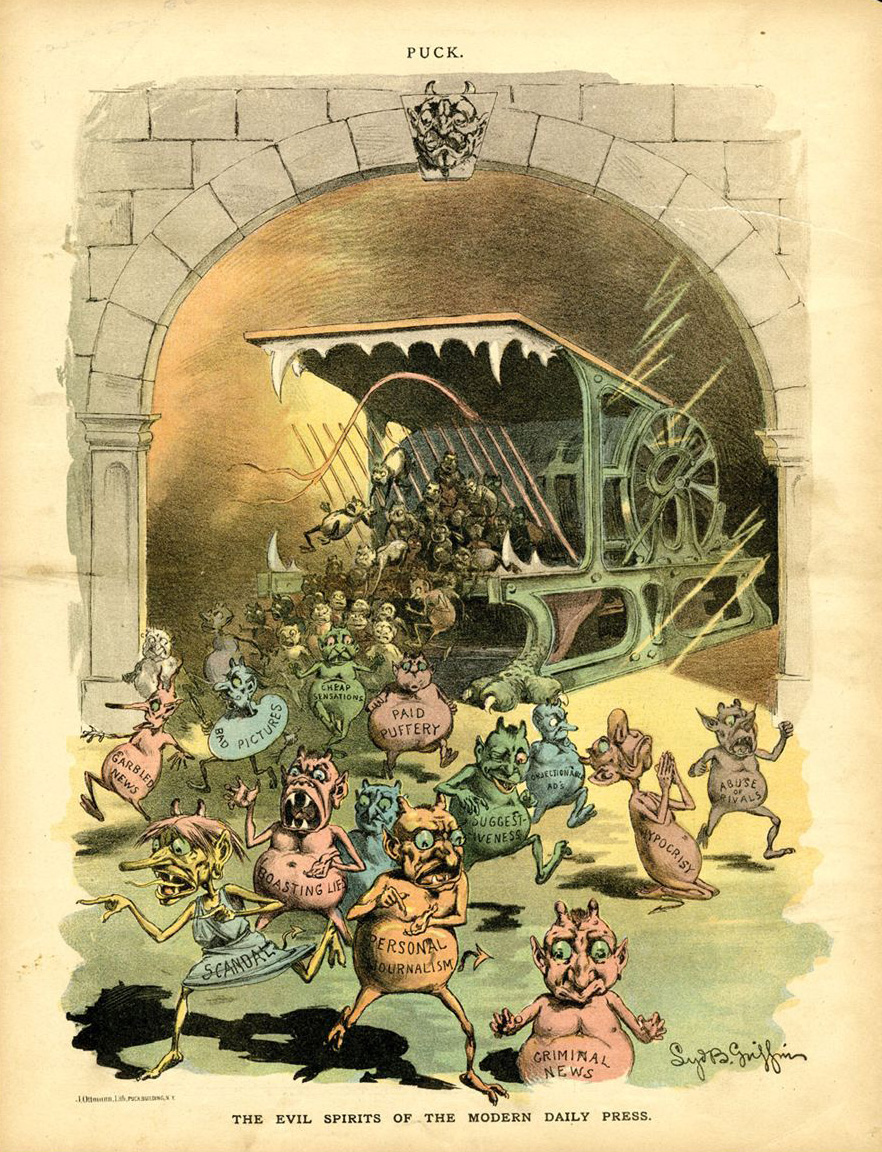
Nasty little printer's devils, 1888

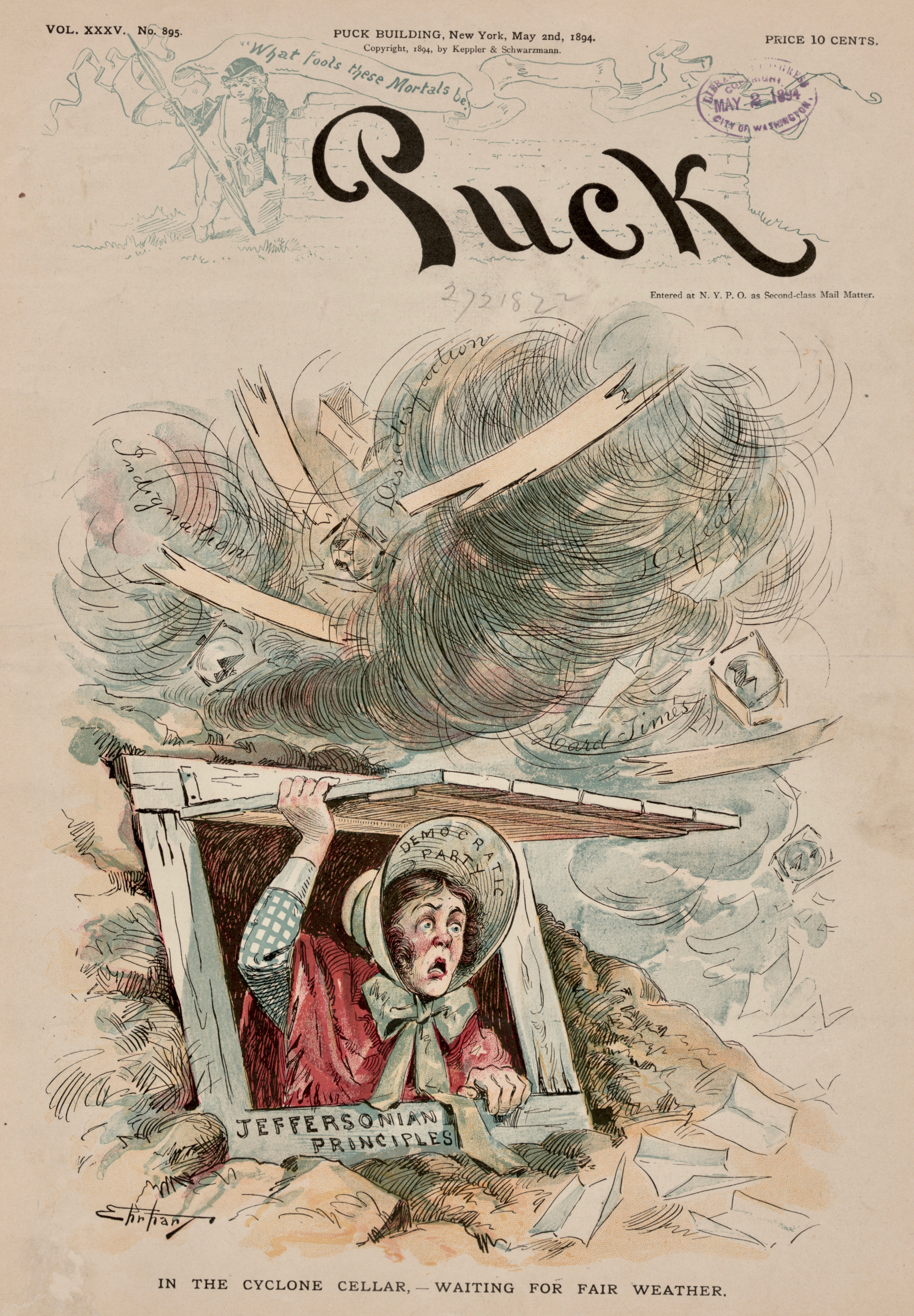
Cyclone as metaphor for political revolution during U.S. mid-term elections of 1894

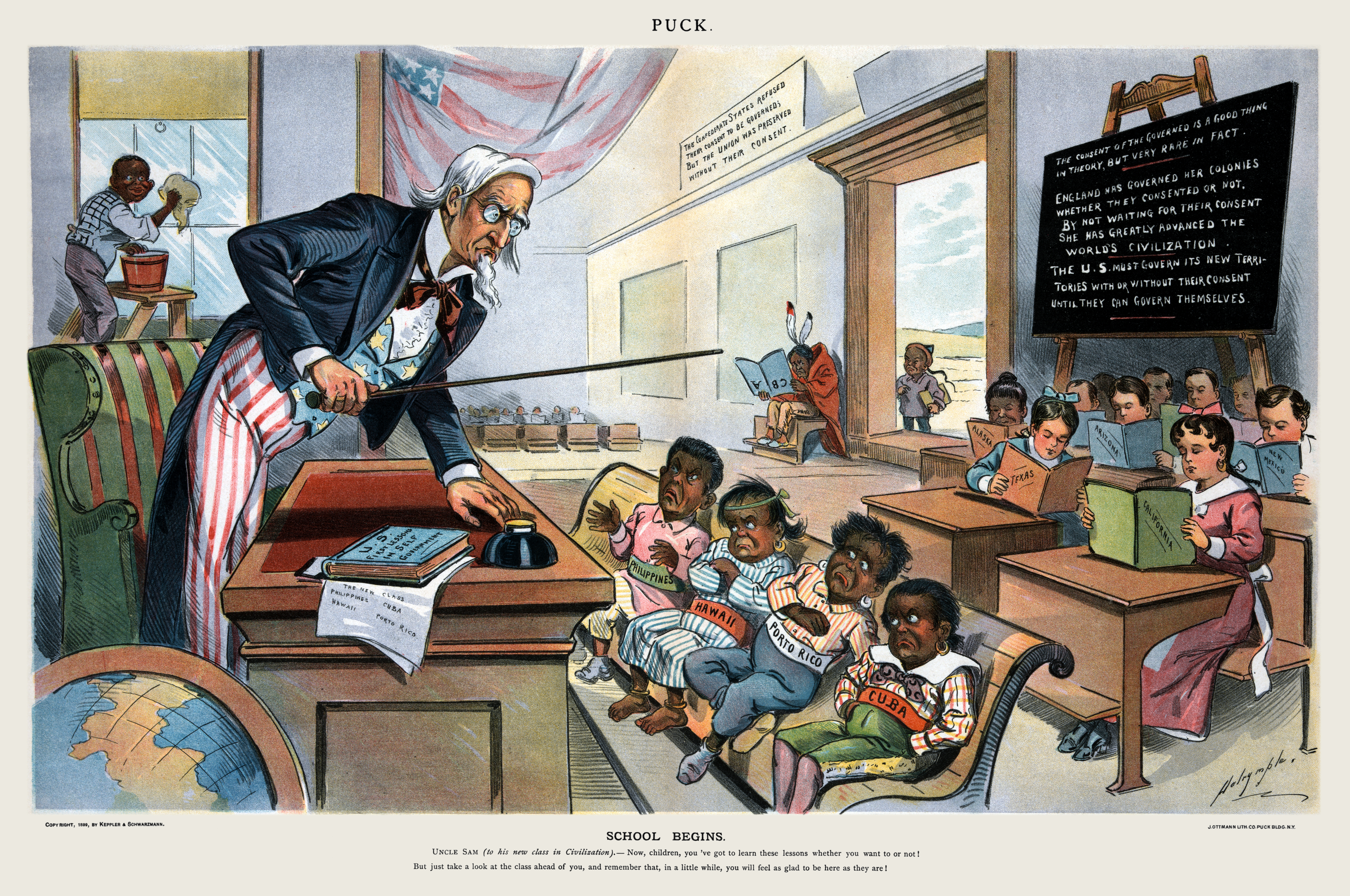
School Begins by Louis Dalrymple, January 25, 1899

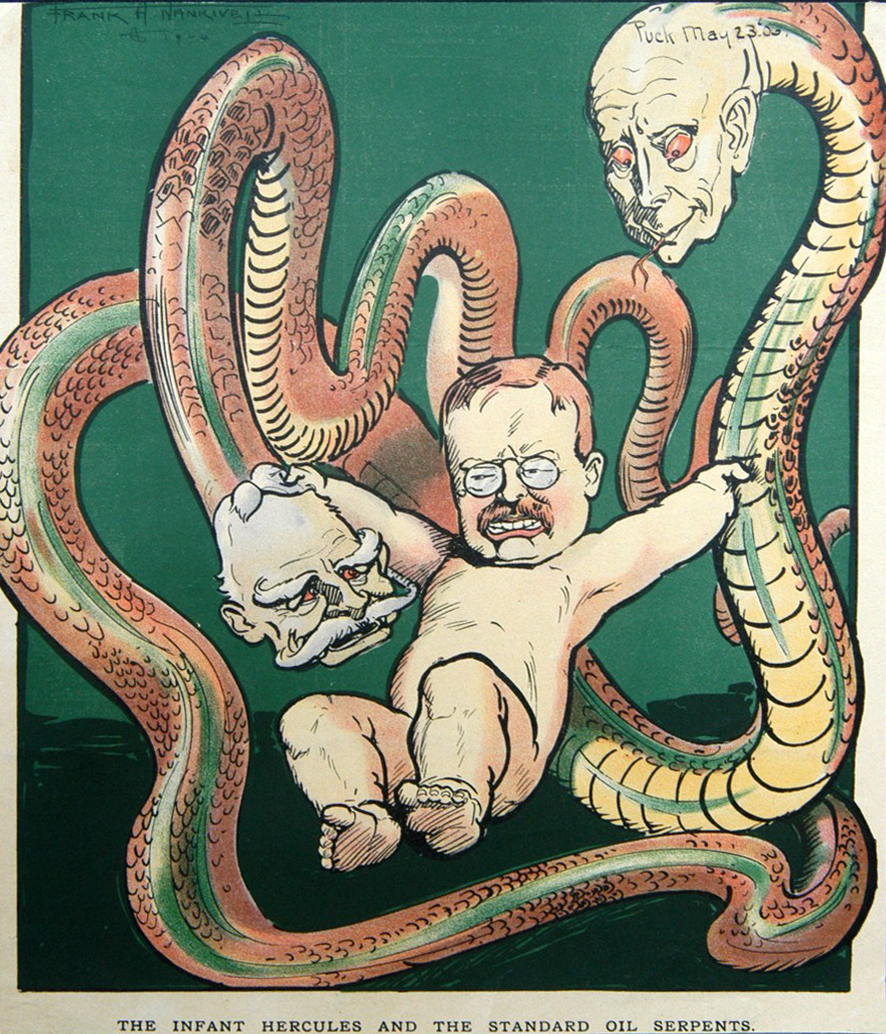
The Infant Hercules and the Standard Oil Serpents by Frank A. Nankivell, depicting U.S. President Theodore Roosevelt grabbing the head of Nelson W. Aldrich and the snake-like body of John D. Rockefeller, May 23, 1906

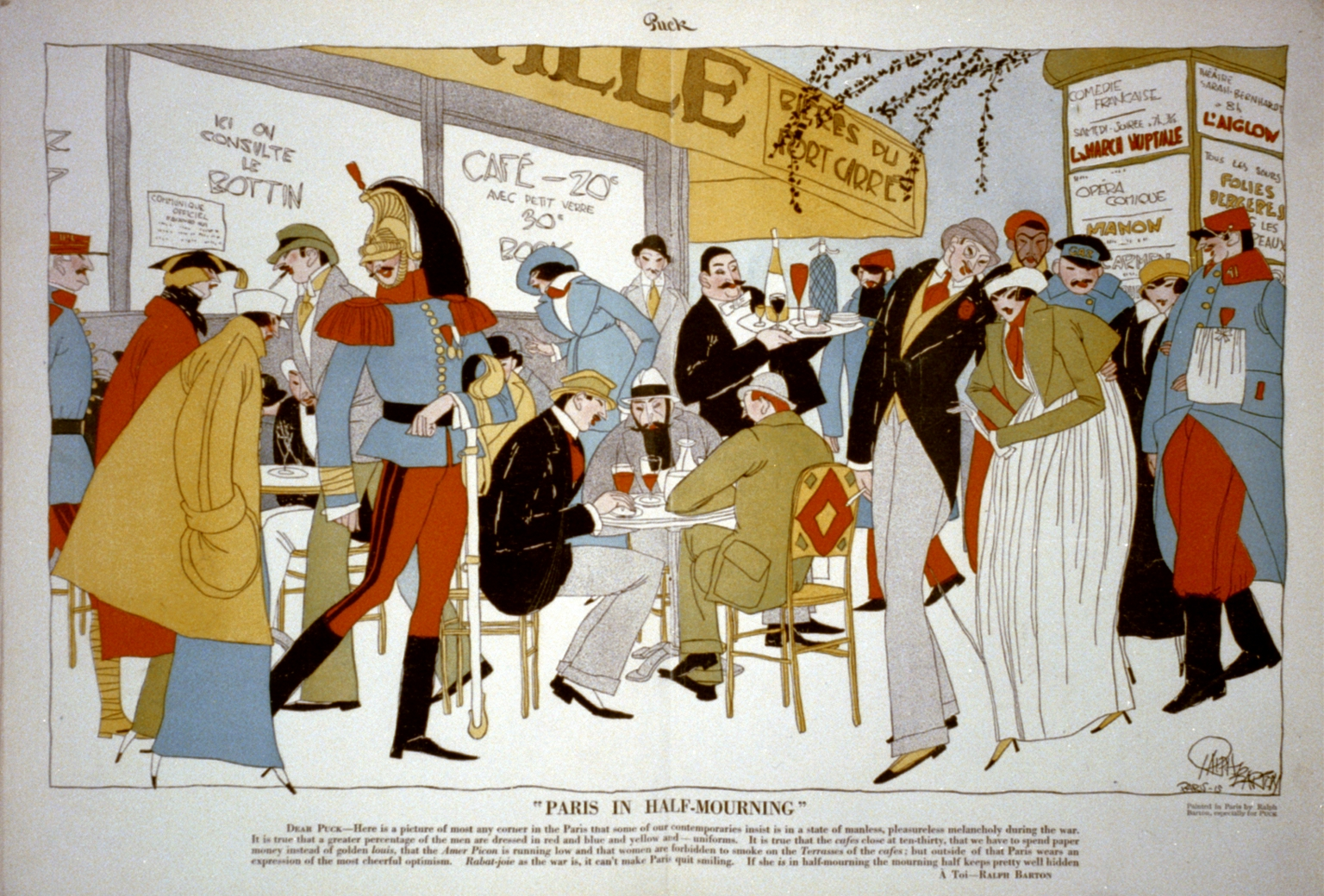
"Paris in Half-Mourning" by Ralph Barton, 1915

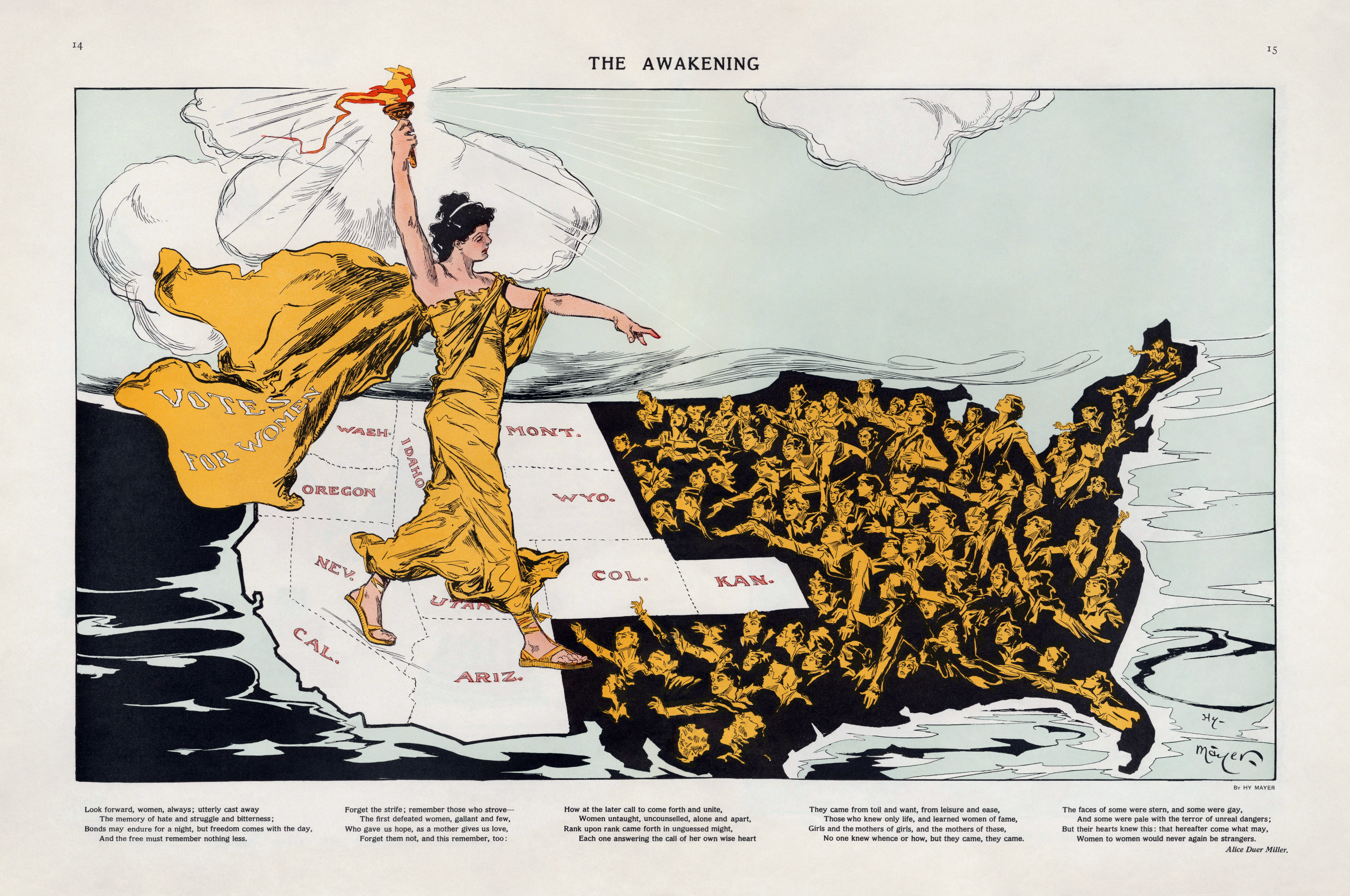
The Awakening (depicting the universal suffrage movement) by Henry "Hy" Mayer, 1915

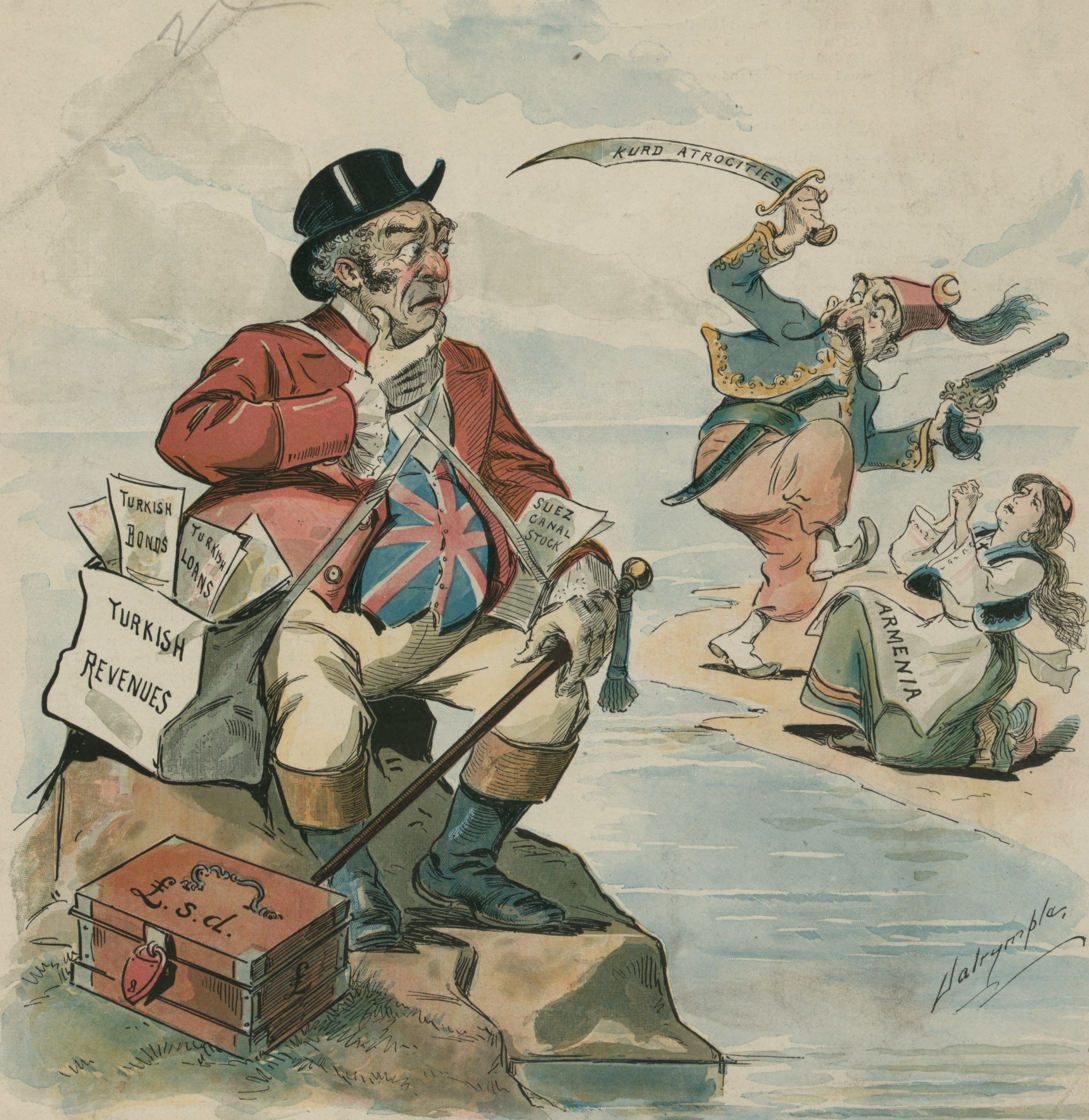
"John Bull's dilemma": "It's 'ard to 'ave to disturb 'im–'e's such a good customer!" by Louis Dalrymple, 1895

== See also ==
- Punch magazine
- Osaka Puck
- Tokyo Puck
- Yellow journalism
