= Adolph Schwarzmann =

German-American printer (1848–1904)

- Born: January 1, 1848; Königsberg, Kingdom of Prussia
- Died: February 4, 1904 (aged 56); New York City, United States
- Citizenship: American
- Occupations: Business manager, printer
- Employer: Frank Leslie's Illustrated Newspaper (1850s-1871)
- Known for: Founder of Puck magazine

Adolph Schwarzmann (1848–1904) was a German-born American printer, business manager and co-founder and publisher of the influential humor and political satire magazine, Puck.

== Early life ==
Schwarzmann was born in Königsberg, Germany (then East Prussia), in 1848. His birth occurred during a period of simmering tension in the German states, a precursor to the revolutionary wave of 1848. While Schwarzmann himself was too young to be a participant in the revolutions of 1848, he came of age in a society deeply affected by its aftermath. The failure of the liberal revolutions led to a mass exodus of German intellectuals, skilled artisans, and political dissidents to the United States. These émigrés, often referred to as "Forty-Eighters," brought with them a distinct cultural and political ethos: secular, progressive, anti-clerical, and deeply committed to democratic ideals.

He emigrated to the United States in New York City, Schwarzmann settled into the vibrant German-American community known as Kleindeutschland (Little Germany), centered in the Lower East Side of Manhattan. By the 1870s, New York City had the third-largest German-speaking population in the world, trailing only Berlin and Vienna. This community was a cultural island, boasting its own newspapers, theaters, beer gardens, shooting societies (Schützenvereine), and singing clubs (Gesangvereine). He was trained in the printing trade, eventually specializing in the lithograph industry.

== Career ==
By 1872 he was working in New York City as foreman of the print shop for Frank Leslie's Illustrated Weekly (or Illustrated Newspaper) one of the largest and most influential publishing empires in the United States.

Schwarzmann's role as foreman placed him at the intersection of artistic ambition and industrial reality. He was responsible for the logistical execution of the publication — managing deadlines, overseeing pressmen, and ensuring the quality of the woodcuts and engravings. This position required a unique blend of technical expertise and personnel management. He had to coordinate the work of artists, engravers, and typesetters, ensuring that the chaotic flow of news was transformed into a physical product on a strict weekly schedule.

It was on the floor of Leslie's print shop that Schwarzmann met Joseph Keppler. an Austrian immigrant with a background in theater and art, had joined Leslie's as a cartoonist after a series of failed ventures in St. Louis. Keppler was the bohemian counterpart to Schwarzmann's disciplined industrialist. Keppler was creative, impulsive, and possessed of a biting wit; Schwarzmann was steady, pragmatic, and financially astute. They bonded over their shared language, their immigrant status, and a mutual dissatisfaction with the limitations of working for Frank Leslie.

=== Founding of Puck Magazine ===
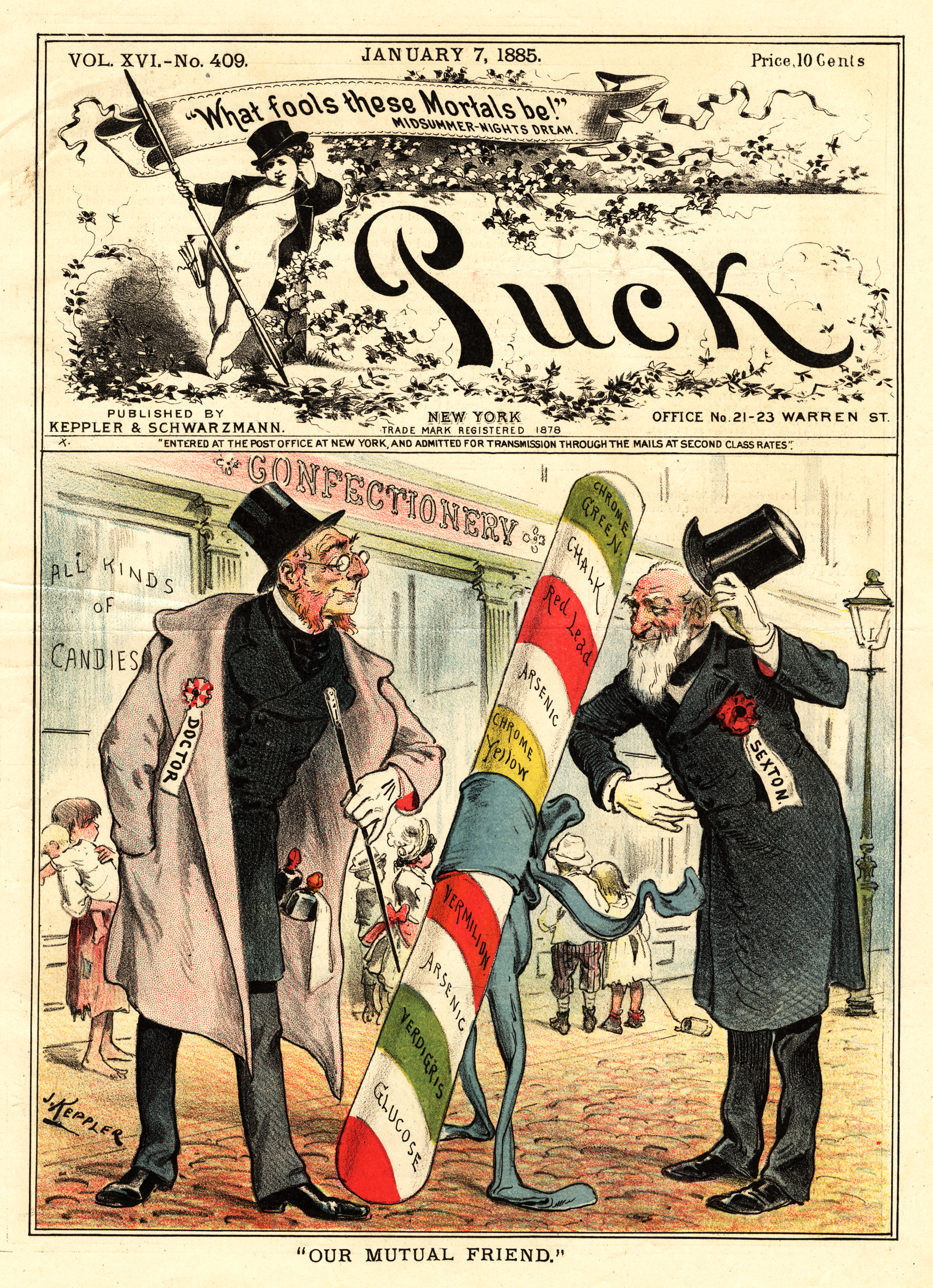
"Our Mutual Friend", January 7, 1885, cover warning of the dangers of color additives used in candy

Schwarzmann is best known for his partnership with Joseph Keppler in establishing Puck magazine.

Schwarzmann immigrated to the United States as a young man, bringing with him the rigorous training of the German printing trade. The German apprenticeship system for printers was renowned for its exacting standards. Unlike the often informal training of American printers, German craftsmen were schooled in the chemistry of inks, the mechanics of presses, and the emerging technologies of lithography. This technical foundation would prove to be Schwarzmann's greatest asset. He did not enter the publishing world as a writer or an editor, but as a technician who understood the physical means of production. This distinction is crucial; while his contemporaries might dream of editorial influence, Schwarzmann understood the logistical constraints and opportunities of ink on paper.

First Attempt (St. Louis): In 1871, Schwarzmann and Keppler first created a short-lived German-language weekly magazine called Puck in St. Louis, Missouri.

Success in New York: After both men relocated to New York, they resurrected the magazine. In August 1876, Schwarzmann opened his own printing business, and in September 1876, he and Keppler formed a partnership to publish the German-language edition of Puck, Humoristisches Wochertblatt.

Role and Contribution: Schwarzmann was crucial to the magazine's success, providing the financial and business support as the printer and business manager, while Keppler focused on the editorial content and illustrations.

English Edition: The successful German edition allowed them to launch an English edition in March 1877. Puck quickly became America's first successful humor magazine featuring full-color lithographic cartoons.

== The Puck Building ==
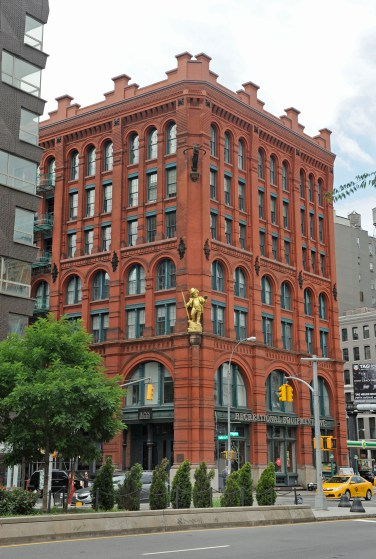
The Puck Building in Manhattan, New York City

In March 1885, due to the magazine's growing circulation, Schwarzmann, Keppler, and J. Ottmann (of the J. Ottmann Lithographing Company, which printed the cartoons) acquired a property in Manhattan. They commissioned the famous Puck Building at the corner of East Houston. and Mulberry Streets to house their two businesses. The original building was completed the following year, in 1886.

== Death ==
Following his partner Keppler's death in 1894, Schwarzmann continued the publication with Keppler's son, Joseph Keppler Jr. Schwarzmann remained the co-publisher and business head of Keppler & Schwarzmann until his death; he died in New York City on February 4, 1904.
