= Puck Building =

Building in Manhattan, New York

- U.S. National Register of Historic Places
- New York State Register of Historic Places
- New York City Landmark
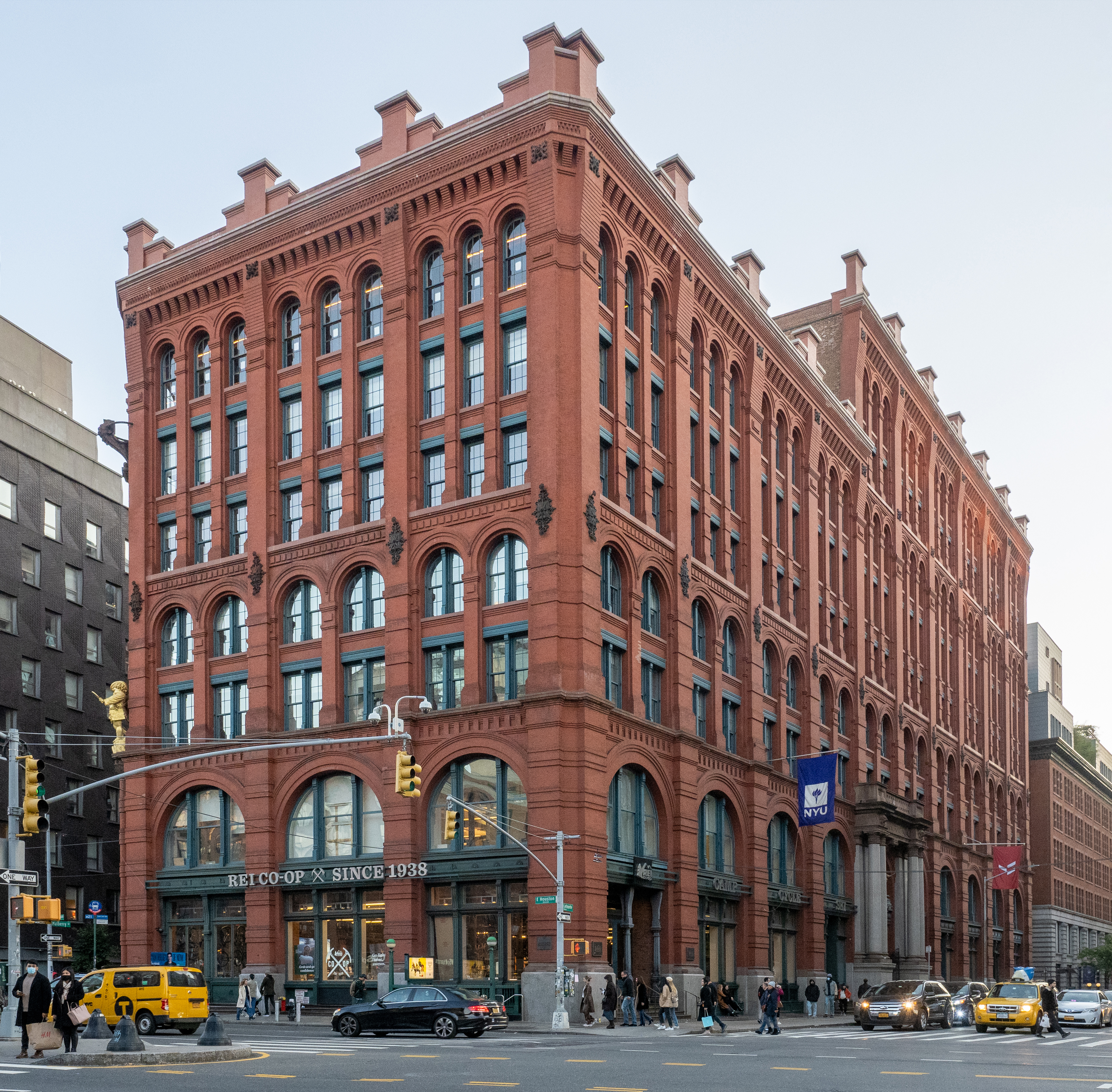
- Seen from Houston Street (2021)
- Location: 295–309 Lafayette Street; Manhattan, New York, U.S.
- Coordinates: 40.7248°N 73.9953°W
- Built: 1885–1886
- Architects: Albert Wagner; Herman Wagner (later expansion)
- Architectural style: Romanesque Revival, Rundbogenstil
- NRHP reference No.: 83001740
- NYSRHP No.: 06101.001564
- NYCL No.: 1226

Significant dates
- Added to NRHP: July 21, 1983
- Designated NYSRHP: June 13, 1983
- Designated NYCL: April 12, 1983

The Puck Building is a mixed-use building at 295–309 Lafayette Street in the SoHo and Nolita neighborhoods of Manhattan in New York City, New York, U.S. The building was designed by Albert Wagner in the Romanesque Revival style, with elements inspired by the German Rundbogenstil style. It is composed of two sections: the original seven-story building to the north and a nine-story southern annex. The Lafayette Street elevation of the facade was designed by Herman Wagner in a style similar to that of the original building. The Puck Building is a New York City designated landmark and is listed on the National Register of Historic Places.

The Puck Building occupies the block bounded by Lafayette, Houston, Mulberry, and Jersey streets. The red brick facade is divided vertically into bays of uniform width. The facade is also divided horizontally into several tiers of arcades, with wider arches at the top and narrower arches at the bottom. The sculptor Henry Baerer crafted two sculptures of the Shakespeare character Puck for the facade. The building is topped by a penthouse structure. The original interiors were arranged as open plan offices, which largely remained intact in the late 20th century. There is retail space in the basement and first two stories; office and studio space on the intermediate stories; and six penthouse apartments on the highest stories.

The building was the longtime home of Puck magazine, a humor cartoon whose founders Joseph Keppler and Adolph Schwarzmann acquired the site in 1885 with J. Ottmann. The original building was completed the following year, and the annex was built between 1892 and 1893. When Lafayette Street was extended through the neighborhood in the late 1890s, the western section of the building was demolished, and a new facade and entrance were built on Lafayette Street. Puck magazine went out of business in 1918, and the structure was used by printing firms over the next several decades. Paul Serra's family bought the Puck Building in 1978, and Serra and his partner Peter Gee converted it to commercial condominiums, which were completed in 1983. A syndicate led by Harry Skydell bought the Puck Building in 1986 and carried out additional renovation. Kushner Properties, a partner in the syndicate, took over the building in the 1990s. The lowest stories were converted to a store in 2011, and Kushner Properties converted the upper stories to penthouse apartments between 2011 and 2013, constructing a dormer for one of the apartments.

== Site ==
The Puck Building is at 295–309 Lafayette Street, in the Nolita and SoHo neighborhoods of Manhattan in New York City, New York, U.S. It occupies an entire city block between Lafayette Street to the west, Houston Street to the north, Mulberry Street to the east, and Jersey Street to the south. The land lot is quadrilateral and measures around 23,397 square feet (2,174 m^{2}). Across the street to the southeast are St. Patrick's Old Cathedral and St. Patrick's Old Cathedral School. In addition, an entrance to the New York City Subway's Broadway–Lafayette Street/Bleecker Street station is directly outside the building to the north. There are glass-and-iron vaulted sidewalks around the building; the vaulted sidewalks on Mulberry Street have all been replaced, but those on Houston and Lafayette streets are largely intact.

Prior to the construction of the Puck Building, the site had been occupied by St. Catherine's Convent, which was built by the Order of the Sisters of Mercy in 1848. The convent was located at 35 East Houston Street, and the adjacent House of Mercy was at 33 East Houston Street. When the building was erected in the 1880s, it was at the southern end of Manhattan's printing district, which was centered around the Astor Library Building. Furthermore, there were numerous publishers, printing firms, and publications headquartered in the neighborhood. These firms had settled in the neighborhood in part because of their proximity to the New York and New Haven Railroad's freight terminal, which was several blocks south on Canal Street between Centre and Lafayette streets.

At the time of the building's construction, Lafayette Street did not exist at the intersection with Houston Street. What is now known as Lafayette Street was two separate streets: Lafayette Place to the north and Elm Street to the south. These two streets were connected between 1897 and 1905. Because of the construction of Lafayette Street, part of the original building has been demolished. Before the original building was truncated, it carried an address of 31–39 East Houston Street.

== Architecture ==
The Puck Building was designed by Albert Wagner and was built for Puck magazine and the J. Ottmann Lithographing Company. It is designed in the Romanesque Revival style, with elements inspired by the German Rundbogenstil style. It was constructed in two parts: The north section was built in 1885–1986 and the south addition in 1892–1993. The front of the building on Lafayette Street was relocated in 1899 when the street (then called Elm Place) was widened. Herman Wagner was the architect for the renovated facade.

=== Facade ===
The current Puck Building is composed of the original structure to the north, which dates from 1885, and the annex to the south, which dates from 1892. In both sections of the building, the western elevation of the facade, along Lafayette Street, dates from 1898. The Lafayette Street elevation is stylistically similar to the original facades of both the original building and the annex. The original building is seven stories high, while the annex is nine stories high. The building's facade includes gilded statues of Shakespeare's character Puck, from A Midsummer Night's Dream; the sculptor Henry Baerer created two such statues for the building.

Every elevation of the facade is divided vertically into bays of uniform width. The original building measures three bays wide (originally five bays) on Houston Street to the north, six bays wide on Mulberry Street to the east, and four bays wide on Lafayette Street to the west. The southern annex is five bays wide on Mulberry Street and six bays wide on Lafayette Street. The southern elevation on Jersey Street is clad in plain brick and has a small number of window openings with iron shutters. The bays are separated vertically by projecting brick piers, which rise atop granite pedestals. The rest of the facade is made of red brick, except for the cast iron window frames and statues, as well as the wrought iron entrance gates. Some terracotta and sandstone is also incorporated into the facade. All four corners of the building are chamfered, with small diagonal cutouts. On Mulberry Street, there are two wrought-iron fire escapes, one each in the annex and the original building.

==== Lower stories ====
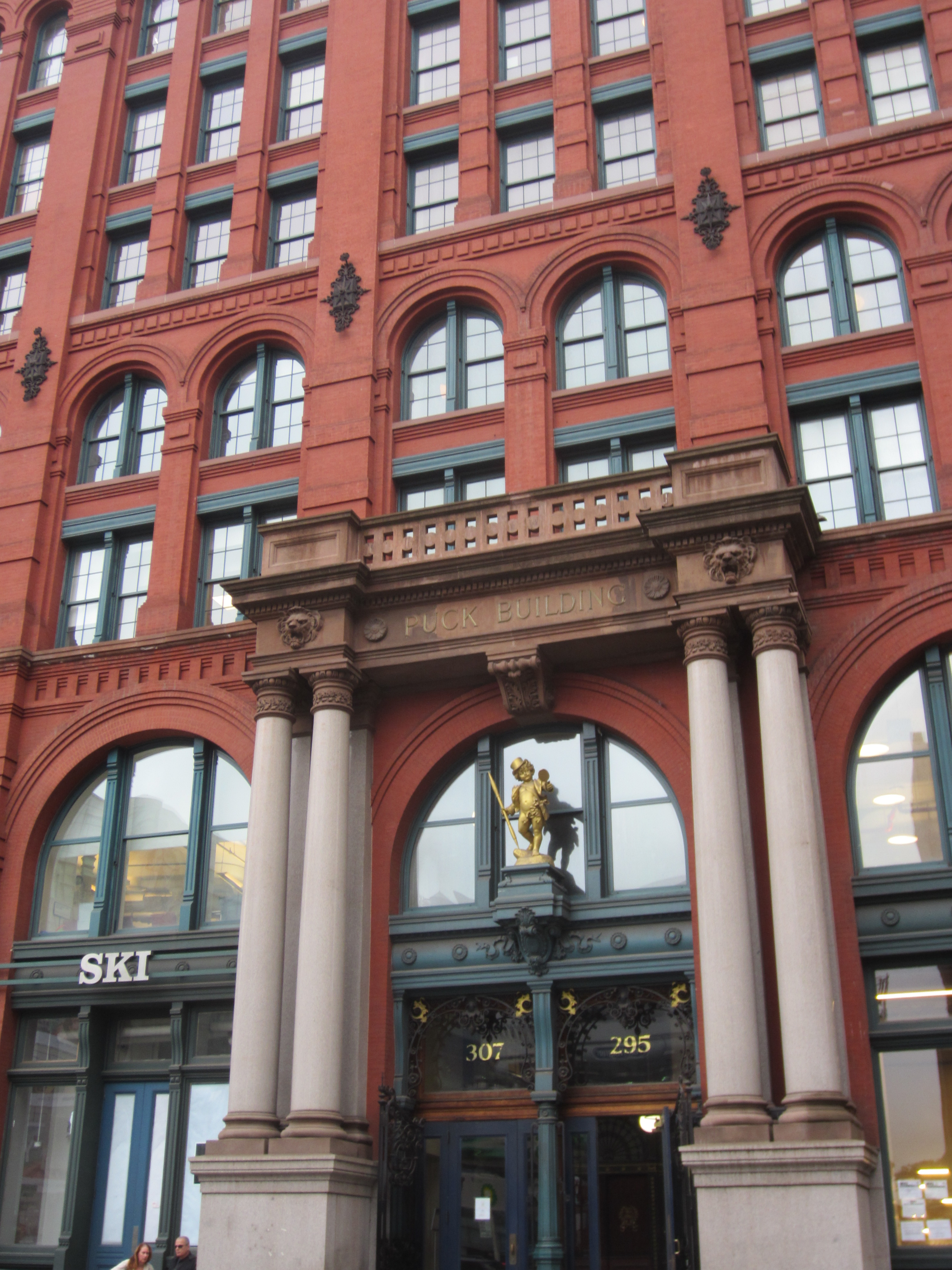
The Lafayette Street entrance, with double-height arches on either side

On the first two stories of the facade, there is one double-height arch in each bay. The piers between each bay are wider than on the upper stories, and there is a brownstone course at the bottom of each pier, just above the granite pedestal. On the first story, most of the bays contain rectangular openings, which are divided vertically into groups of three. Some of the first-story openings contain storefront entrances instead of windows; these entrances are accessed by small stoops, which are made of pieces of vaulted sidewalk. The second story is a semicircular lunette window, which is divided vertically into three panes. A cast-iron transom bar separates the first- and second-story windows. The lunettes are surrounded by round arches with slightly projecting edges, and there is a horizontal string course made of brownstone above the second story.

The Puck Building's main entrance is on Lafayette Street, within the fifth-northernmost bay. This entrance is shaped like a triumphal arch. At the ground story of the archway are two rectangular doorways, which are separated by a cast-iron column and flanked by smaller cast-iron piers. In front of each doorway is an ornate Art Nouveau wrought-iron arch with a set of wrought-iron gates. A transom bar runs above the doorways, and a statue of Puck stands atop the center of the transom bar. Above the transom bar is a lunette window. On either side of the entrance is a granite pedestal, above which are two stone columns and two pilasters, all in the Doric order. The columns and pilasters are all topped by capitals with wreath motifs. Above the columns is an architrave bearing the words "Puck Building" in all-capital letters, with a console bracket below the center and a balustrade above it.

When the building was completed, Puck magazine described the structure as having round arches along both Houston and Mulberry streets, with a recessed wrought-iron entrance at the corner of these streets. The entrance at the northeast corner of the building, at Houston and Mulberry streets, included a pair of doorways until 1899. This entrance has been replaced with a double-height brick column with a brownstone sphere. Above it is one of the Puck statues. which holds a mirror, pen, and book. The statue also included the inscription "What fools these mortals be", the phrase printed on Puck magazine covers; this inscription had been worn away by the 1950s. When the building's entrance was located at this corner, the column stood in front of the entrance.

==== Upper stories ====
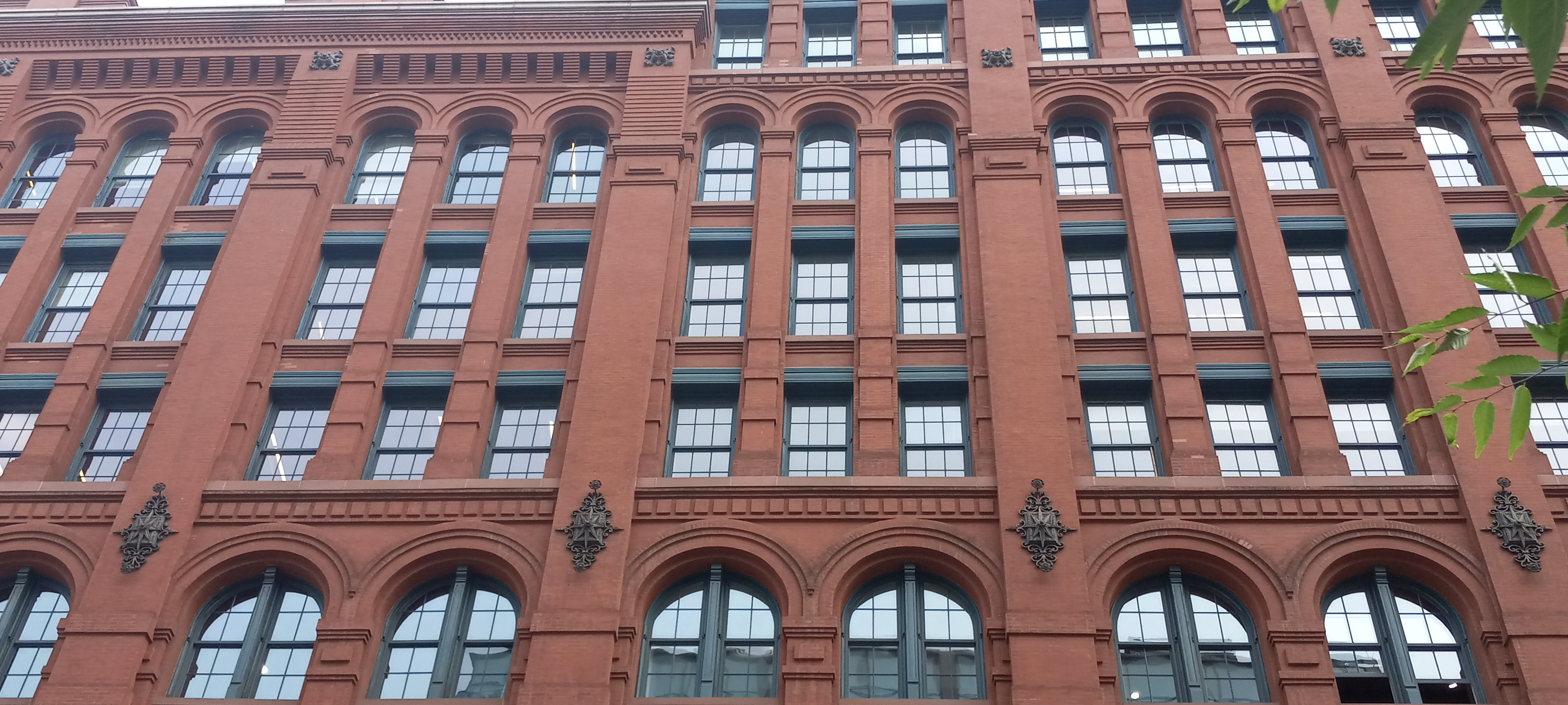
The windows on the fourth through seventh stories. On the fourth story, each bay contains two windows, while on the floors above, the bays are split into groups of three.

On the third to seventh stories, the piers are narrower than on the lower stories. The third and fourth stories comprise a second tier of arcades. Within each bay, the third and fourth stories are composed of two double-height arches, each of which is half the width of the ground-level arches. The windows between the third and fourth stories are separated by patterned spandrel panels. Within each arched opening, there is a pair of sash windows on either story. Each pair of arches is separated vertically by a narrow brickwork pier with patterned capitals. In addition, there are corbels and brownstone sills running horizontally above the fourth story.

The fifth through seventh stories of each bay comprise a third arcade. On these stories, each bay has three triple-height arches, each measuring one-third of the width of the ground-level arches. Within each arched opening, there is a single sash window on each of the fifth through seventh stories. As with the third-and-fourth-story windows, each arch is divided by narrow brickwork piers with patterned capitals. At the sixth story of the building's northeast corner, the chamfer has a massive console bracket, which originally served as the base of a flagpole. A patterned brick course, corbels, a brownstone sill, and a cornice run horizontally above the seventh story of the original building.

The annex rises another two stories; the eighth and ninth stories of the annex form a separate arcade. On these stories, each bay contains three double-height arches, which are the same width as the arches on the fifth through seventh stories. A cornice runs horizontally above the ninth floor, and each of the piers rises slightly above the level of the cornice. Both the original building and the annex were originally topped by a parapet. The section of the parapet above the original building was removed by the late 20th century but was restored in the 2010s.

=== Interior ===
The ceilings on the first floor are 18 feet (5.5 m) high, shrinking to 10.5 feet (3.2 m) on the upper stories. The interior's architectural features included a cast-iron elevator. cast-iron staircases, wooden wainscoting, and open plan spaces with cast-iron columns. The columns were decorated with motifs such as rosettes, fluting, bosses, and bands. The original building to the north has a wood-beam and cast iron superstructure, while the southern annex has a brick-vault and cast iron superstructure. The brick vaults were strong enough to accommodate the weight of the building's printing presses.

The ground (first) floor was originally used by the J. Ottman firm, and it also included a stair leading to the Puck company offices on the upper stories. On the upper floors was a reception area, a library, an office, a workshop and reception room, and a set of artists' ateliers. There was also a photographer's darkroom on the fifth floor. In addition, artists' sketches were reproduced in color in a transfer room on the sixth floor. The building had 24 or 30 printing presses as well. After the original building was finished, King's Handbook of New York City characterized the building as being among the largest printing-plant structures in the world. A Puck magazine supplement described the structure as being the largest printing plant near the Astor Library.

Most of the interior, including the open plan offices, remained intact in the late 20th century. A lobby for commercial tenants was added during the 1980s renovation. On average, each of the modern-day building's floors covers about 22,000 square feet (2,000 m^{2}) or 24,500 square feet (2,280 m^{2}). The building contains both office and retail space as well as ballrooms for large events on the ground and ninth floors. The Skylight Ballroom can accommodate 250 guests, while the Grand Ballroom can fit up to 1,000. Large masonry walls, measuring 2 feet (0.61 m) thick, split the interiors into thirds.

==== Penthouse apartments ====
At the top of the building are six penthouse apartments collectively known as the Puck Penthouses; they were designed by Jose Ramirez and Sherida E. Paulsen. The apartments are accessed through their own entrance and are served by a concierge. The penthouse lobby has an imported European cast-iron fireplace mantel, and the private elevator has a depiction of Puck. Each of the apartments is designated with a Roman numeral apartment number. The penthouses range from 4,895 to 7,000 square feet (454.8 to 650.3 m^{2}). Each penthouse has a separate layout; three of the penthouses have outdoor terraces, and two units occupy two levels. The largest unit is Penthouse I, which spans 7,241 square feet (672.7 m^{2}) and includes five bedrooms, seven bathrooms, and 5,100 square feet (470 m^{2}) of terraces.

The Puck Penthouses retain the spaces' original large windows, cast-iron columns, and vaulted brick ceilings. The units were fully furnished when they were built. The apartments have custom stoves, window frames, door hinges, and other appliances, and the bathrooms are clad in travertine. In addition, the doors are made of nickel and glass, materials that were selected specifically to give the penthouses an industrial ambiance. The builders hardware is made of materials such as marble and nickel. There are also electronic devices, such as hidden televisions in the bathroom mirrors. One of the penthouses is within a dormer structure, which has a steel frame and is structurally connected with the frames of the original structure and annex.

== History ==
=== Puck ownership ===
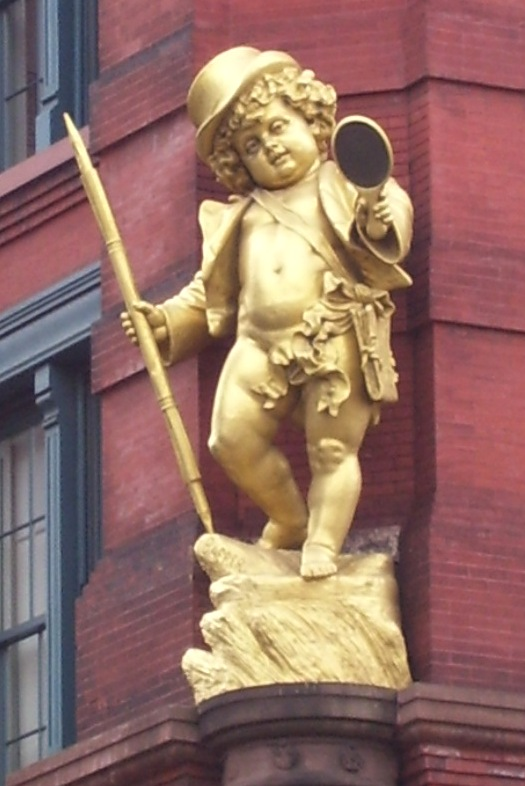
A gilded statue of Shakespeare's character Puck above the original entrance at the building's northwest corner

The building was the longtime home of Puck magazine, a humor cartoon. Joseph Keppler and Adolph Schwarzmann had founded Puck as a German-language publication in 1876 and started publishing in English in 1877. Puck magazine was originally situated near the Manhattan end of the Brooklyn Bridge. Puck and the J. Ottmann Lithographing Company, which printed out Puck cartoons, were situated on Warren Street in Manhattan's Civic Center by 1880. The magazine's circulation had grown to 80,000 by then, and it needed a larger building.

==== Development and opening ====
In February 1885, Keppler, Schwarzmann, and J. Ottmann agreed to acquire the Institution of Mercy at the southwest corner of Mulberry Street and Houston Street. The sale was finalized the next month; the three men paid $140,000 (equivalent to $5,017,000 in 2025) for the site. The men hired Albert Wagner to design a seven-story building, with two basements, on a site measuring 117 feet (36 m) along Houston Street and 138 feet (42 m) along Mulberry Street. As planned, the ground floor would contain stores, the second and third stories would be used as offices, and the upper stories would be used as a printing plant. Demolition was underway by mid-1885. Keppler, Schwarzmann, and J. Ottmann borrowed $130,000 (equivalent to $4,658,000 in 2025) from the Franklin Savings Bank. The George A. Fuller Company was the main construction contractor.

The Puck Building was completed in 1886. The original building was much wider along its northern end, at Houston Street, than along its southern end. At the time, it had 231,000 square feet (21,500 m^{2}) of space. Originally, Ottmann's lithograph firm was located on the ground floor, while the Puck offices upstairs were accessed by a separate lobby. Shortly after the building was finished, in June 1887, a fire caused up to $30,000 in damage to the upper floors (equivalent to $1,075,000 in 2025). There was also water damage to Puck magazine's editorial rooms when firefighters tried to put out the blaze. The building caught fire again in early 1888, although the blaze was extinguished before a large amount of flammable material in the basement could catch fire. By the late 19th century, Puck employed 400 people at the building.

==== Expansion ====
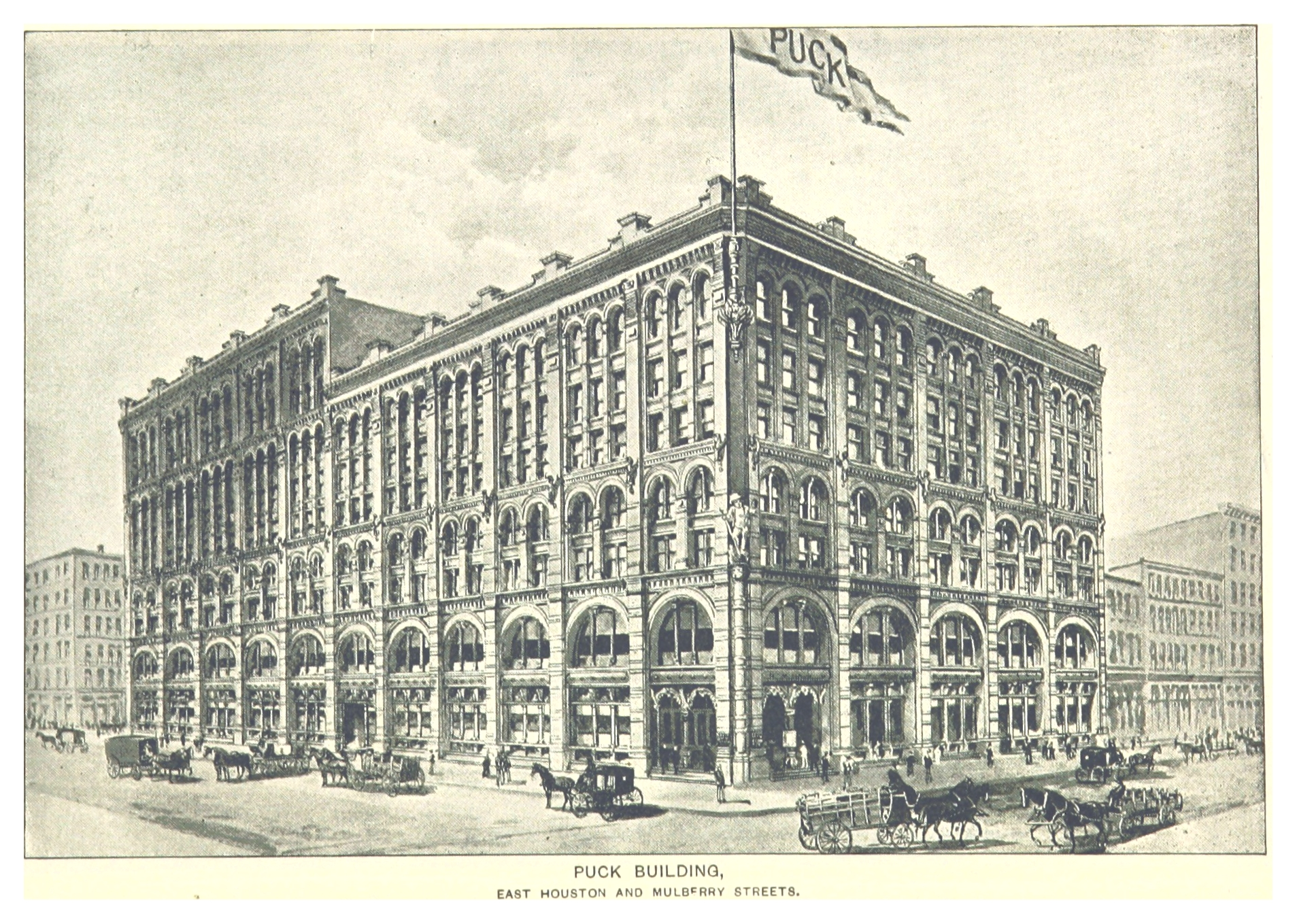
Houston and Mulberry, 1893

The Board of Rapid Transit Commissioners, which was appointed in 1889 to plan a New York City Subway line, announced a tentative route for the subway's first line in June 1890. Part of the Puck Building would need to be demolished because the line would be built underneath a new street running between Elm Street and Lafayette Place, and the building stood in the line's way. The building would have to be reconfigured so that it had a facade along the new street. That August, Keppler, Schwarzmann, and Ottmann acquired the site at 281 Mulberry Street, directly south of the Puck Building. At the time, the irregularly-shaped site on Mulberry Street contained a three-story tenement, which Keppler and his partners planned to demolish and replace with an annex to the Puck Building. Due to uncertainties over the subway line's construction, the annex's construction was delayed.

B. B. Schneider sold Keppler and Schwarzmann the site on the northwest corner of Mulberry and Jersey streets in March 1892. This gave Puck's executives full control of the western side of Mulberry Street between Houston and Jersey streets. The same month, Thomas Weatherby sold four houses on the north side of Jersey Street, immediately west of Schneider's plot, to Keppler and Schwarzmann. Wagner was rehired to design the annex, which was to rise nine stories. W. Arnott was hired as the stonemason for the annex, which was planned to cost $365,000 or $400,000. Work on the annex began sometime in 1892; during the annex's construction, some workers went on strike. In January 1893, the city government agreed to widen and extend Elm Street northward, which would require demolishing about one-third of the existing building; several property owners, including Keppler, expressed objections to the street's extension. That year, Keppler, Schwarzmann, and Ottmann borrowed $300,000 for the annex from the Brooklyn Savings Bank (equivalent to $10,750,000 in 2025). The annex was ultimately completed in 1893.

==== Partial demolition and early 20th century ====
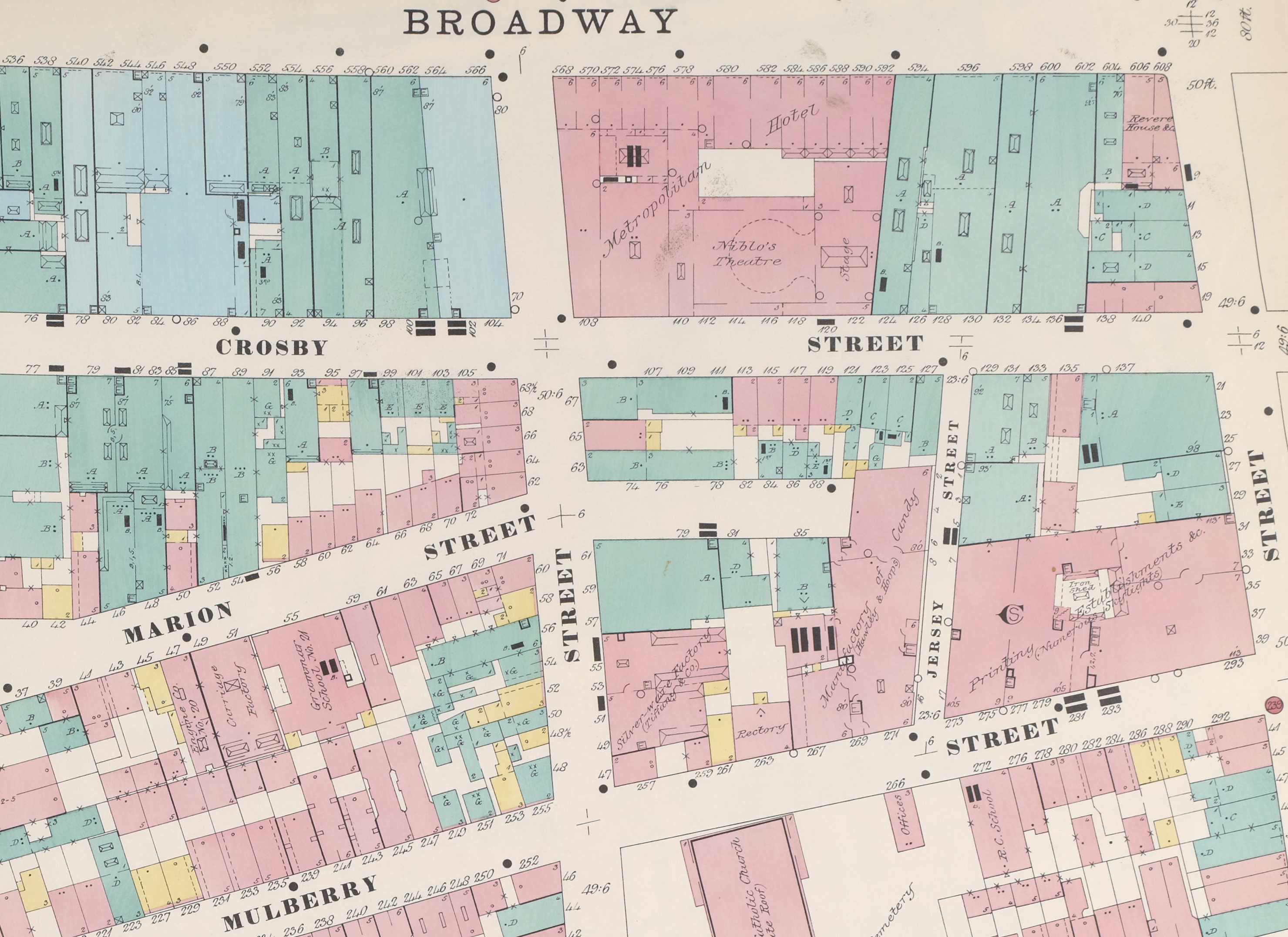
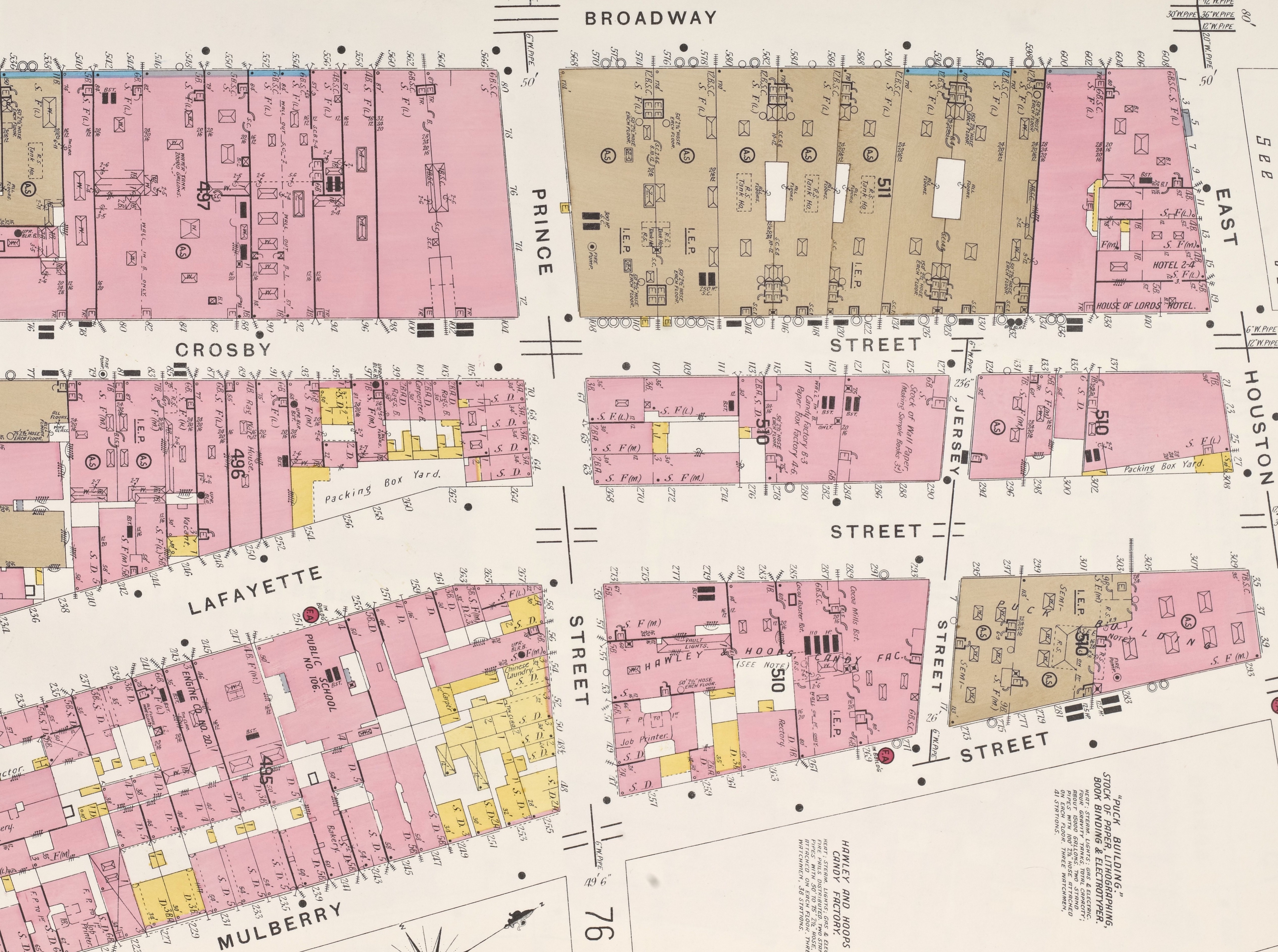
Maps published in 1894 (left) and 1905 (right) show the Puck Building, lower right, before and after Lafayette Street (labeled here as Marion Street) was cut through the block, necessitating the relocation of the western wall.

Meanwhile, there were still plans to extend Elm Street north through Marion Street and Lafayette Place. In 1893, the city's Board of Street Opening and Improvement submitted plans for the project to the New York City Board of Aldermen for approval. Though the building's owners were still opposed to the street's extension as late as December 1894, they had come to support the proposal by the following year. To make way for the section of Elm Street between Houston and Jersey streets, the city government decided to raze the building's westernmost section in 1897. A city commission was appointed to determine how much each property owner should be compensated. They determined that the owners of the Puck Building would receive $464,000 in compensation (equivalent to $17,957,000 in 2025).

In September 1897, the Puck Publishing Corporation filed plans for $275,000 worth of alterations to the Puck Building (equivalent to $10,643,000 in 2025). Wagner was again hired as the architect for these modifications, and Hanlon Brothers were hired to demolish part of the building. P. & J. Schaeffler received the masonry contract; Grissler & Son was hired as the carpenter; and Baker, Smith & Co. was hired to reconfigure the building's steam-heating system. After Wagner died in 1898, Herman Wagner and Richard Jahn took over responsibility for the design. The northern part of the facade, originally five bays wide, was truncated to three bays. Heavy braces measuring 60 feet (18 m) long were used to temporarily shore up the northern and eastern elevations, and part of the remaining structure's facade on Houston Street was also demolished and rebuilt. A new main entrance was built to the west on Elm Street (later Lafayette Street). replacing the original entrance at Houston and Mulberry streets, and Henry Baerer designed a Puck statue above the new Elm Street entrance. Materials salvaged from the building were reportedly reused in a four-story building at 163 Crosby Street.

The modifications to the Puck Building were completed in 1899, though Lafayette Street was not completed until 1905. After Keppler and Schwarzmann died in 1894 and 1904, respectively, their estates took over the respective stakes in the company (including the Puck Building). A fire in November 1905 caused $50,000 in damage (equivalent to $1,792,000 in 2025). The fire had started after a can of turpentine caught fire inside a finishing room where workers were producing Christmas cards. In 1912, six people were severely injured after one of the building's elevators fell seven stories. The Manhattan Ladies' Hat Company leased some space in the building in 1912, followed by Teitelbaum & De Marinis the following year. The Puck Building remained Puck magazine's headquarters until 1917, when Hearst Communications took over the magazine. Puck was discontinued in September of the following year.

=== Mid-20th century ===
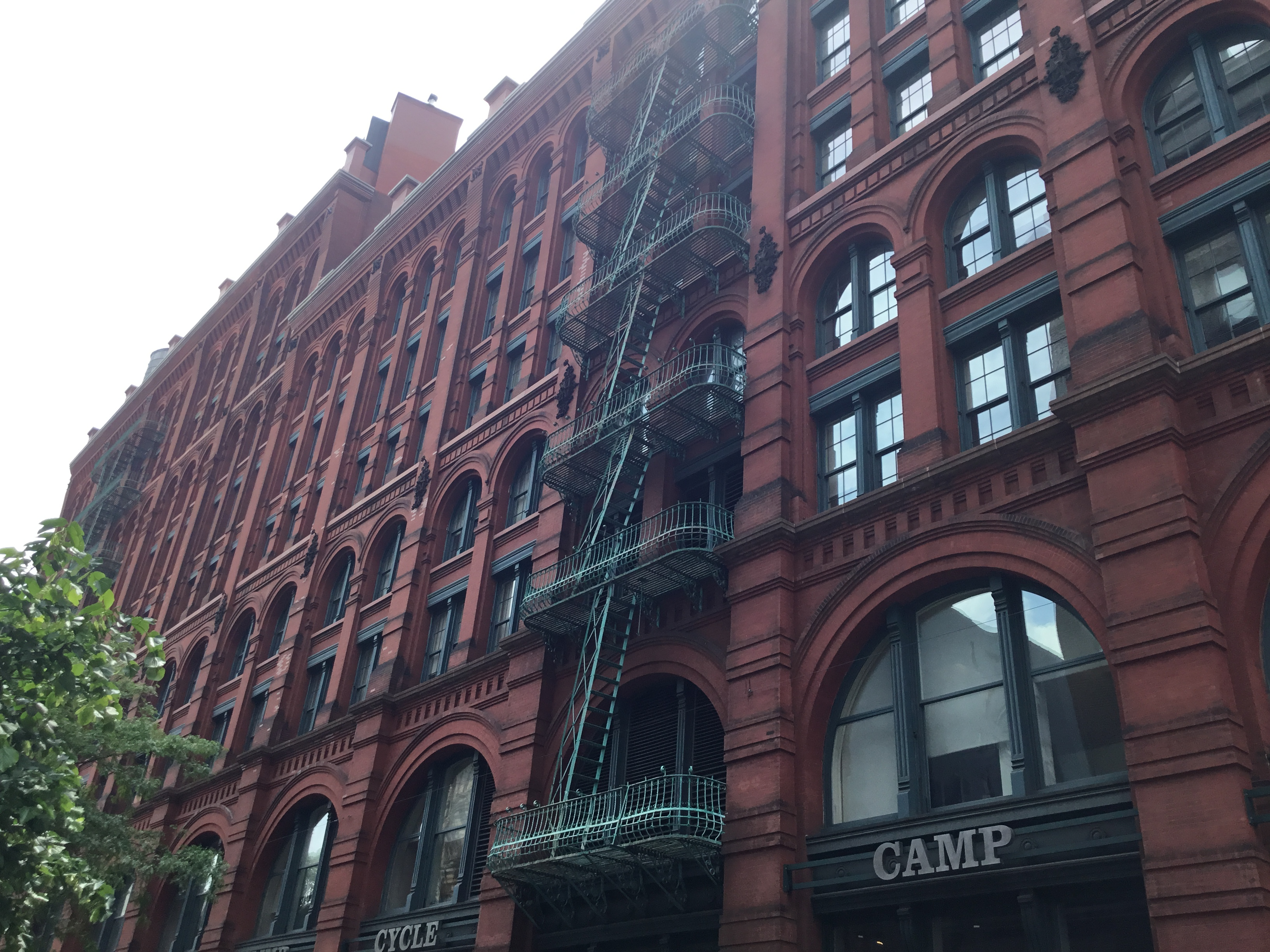
The building's Mulberry Street facade

Though Puck magazine had been discontinued, the building remained suitable for firms in the printing industry, as its floor plates had been built to accommodate heavy printing presses. The building thus housed numerous independent printing firms and related printing services. Among the building's tenants were the Keller Printing Company in one of the building's lofts, the Paulus-Ullmann Printing Corporation on the fifth floor, and the Paulus & Howell Press on the eighth floor. All of the usable space had been rented by the end of 1917, when Acme Steel Goods Company took the seventh floor. Other tenants in the late 1910s included the American Paper Mills, clothing manufacturers Zeeman & Grossman, Raymond Engineering Corporation, and a store operated by Olney & Warrin.

A ladies' hat manufacturers' association moved into the building in the 1920s, and Comfort & Company, Inc., leased a large part of the building in 1935. The building's other tenants in the mid-20th century included the bookbinder J. C. Valentine Company (which moved out in 1931 after four decades there); the printing company Lehmaier Press; the Parker-Wilson Printing Company; the printing company Costa & Aliani; and the Pioneer Scientific Corporation. An office stationery company, S. Novick & Son, occupied the second floor; its salesmen included former U.S. Assistant Secretary of State Alger Hiss. In 1937, the Puck statue above the main entrance was cleaned.

In 1947, the Puck Building was sold to a client of David Rapaport; this was the first time the building had changed ownership in half a century. By then, the building was cited as having 210,000 square feet (20,000 m^{2}) of space, and it was valued at $490,000 (equivalent to $7,065,000 in 2025). Marlow Handbags moved its factory to the Puck Building in the following year. By the 1950s and 1960s, the building also housed such tenants as the Empire Bookbinding Company, Prospect Press, Sample Service Corporation, and the garment-industry-ticket producer Keller Ticket Company. After Coney Island's Steeplechase Park was closed in 1965, part of the amusement park's fence was moved to the Puck Building, where it was rebuilt.

=== Serra and Gee ownership ===
Paul Serra's family bought the Puck Building in 1978; at the time, the building was fully occupied. Serra and his partner Peter Gee, who ran a company called Peter, Paul and Puck, began making plans to renovate the building. The two largest tenants moved out of the building in 1980, and all but one of the other tenants moved out during the subsequent months. The Serra family bought out the last tenant's lease and proposed converting the building into a commercial condominium. Initially, there were plans to add residential space, but this was canceled due to high costs, as the owners had to pay the displaced commercial tenants $9 per square foot. Additionally, Gee said "there are too many problems involved with the city and dealing with people's personal lives" when it came to residential tenancies.

Serra and Gee converted the building to office and gallery space for graphic-arts firms. Workers regilded the Puck statues, renovated the elevator cabs, added interior wainscoting, and installed new wiring and HVAC systems; in addition, they preserved a much of the original interiors as they could. During the building's renovation, in 1982, the author and artist Theresa Hak Kyung Cha was raped and killed in the building by a security guard named Joey Sanza. The renovation ultimately cost $14 million and mostly involved cosmetic changes. The Puck Building's renovation, along with the construction of other residential buildings nearby, helped attract retailers to Lafayette Street, which had been a frequent hangout for drug dealers. The New York City Landmarks Preservation Commission (LPC) designated it as a city landmark in April 1983, and the structure was added to the National Register of Historic Places the same year.

The Puck Building reopened in April 1983. The reopening was celebrated with a temporary exhibit on the history of Puck magazine, which included artifacts from the building that were discovered during its renovation. Initially, the first two stories contained galleries, the midsection had offices, and the top stories had schools. One-third of the entire floor area was reserved for a design school operated by Gee, while the two men planned to sell the remaining space to designers, artists, and other tenants who wanted more than 10,000 square feet (930 m^{2}). The smallest condo spanned 4,000 square feet (370 m^{2}), and the units were listed for sale at an average price of $125 per square foot ($1,350/m^{2}). To attract tenants, Serra and Gee offered to split up existing condo units and install new floors, and they gave commercial tenants their own lobby. The structure also hosted events such as dinner parties and balls. Three years after the renovation, none of the condos had been sold, prompting Serra and Gee to sell the Puck Building.

=== Skydell and Kushner ownership ===
==== 1980s to 2000s ====
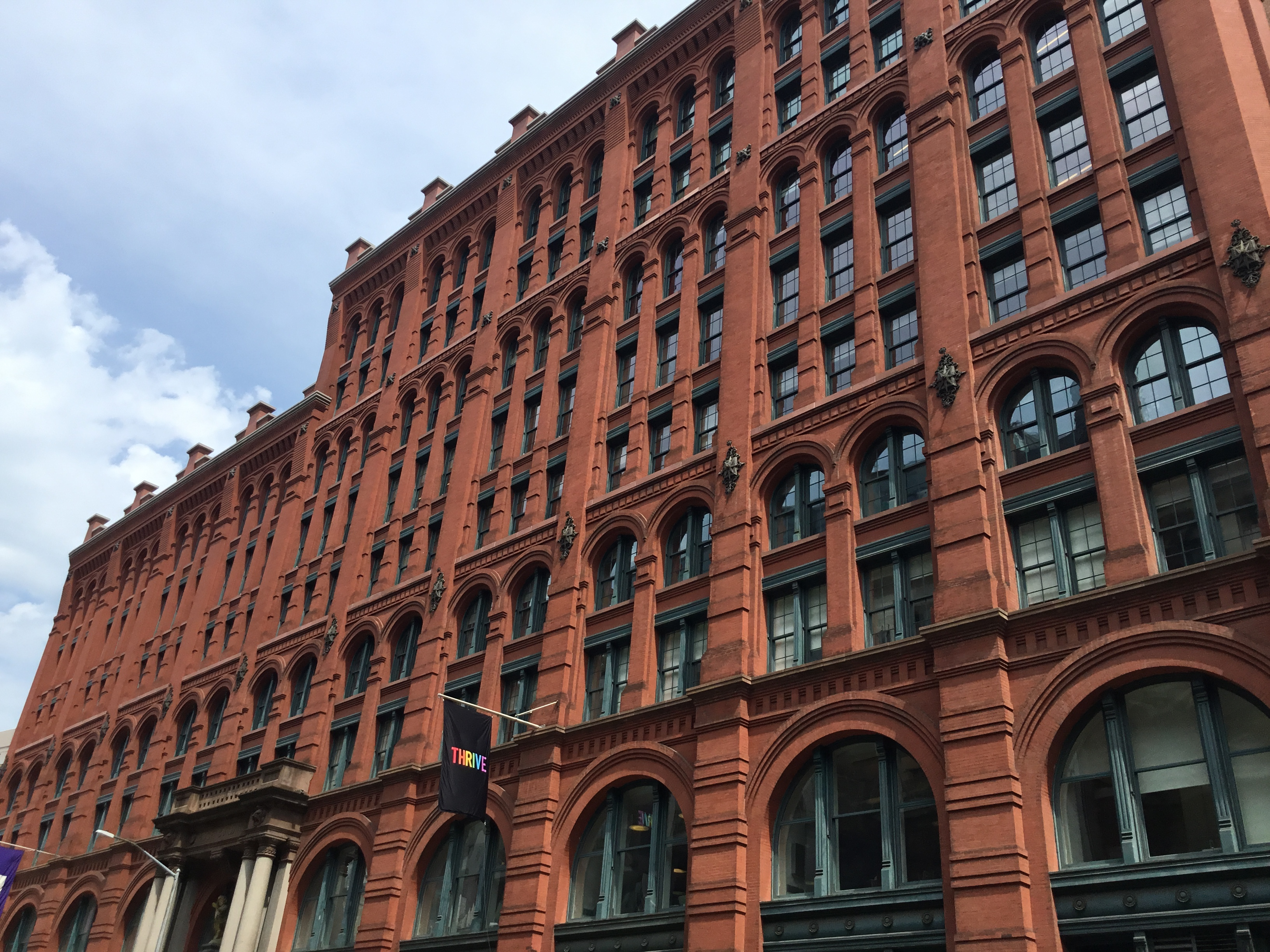
The building's Lafayette Street facade

In 1986, a syndicate led by Harry Skydell paid $19 million for the building. Skydell's partners in the syndicate included George Gellert, Charles Kushner, and Joel Seiden, and Skydell's firm Hudson Park Management took over the building's operation. Skydell and his partners spent another $9 million on the building, which included new elevators and mechanical systems. Sonnenblick-Goldman Corporation, borrowed $26.3 million to pay for the building's renovation and purchase.

After the second renovation, the Puck Building was nearly fully occupied. The building was the original home of Spy Magazine, whose founders, Graydon Carter and Kurt Andersen, had specifically wanted to establish a magazine in the former Puck headquarters. The Pratt Institute opened its Manhattan Center campus on the building's second floor in 1986, relocating several of its graphics and illustration departments there. In addition, the New York City government rented four floors, three of which were occupied by the Department of Environmental Protection and Department of Transportation; the city's Civilian Complaint Review Board also had offices in the Puck Building, The New York Press magazine moved into the building as well. The Puck Building's ballroom became a popular venue for fashion shows, in part due to the ballroom's relatively low rental rates and plain architectural design. Other events hosted in the building during the late 20th and early 21st centuries included the National Black Fine Art Show and the Outsider Art Fair.

Skydell owed $2.2 million on the Puck Building and another structure by the early 1990s. Because of the ownership syndicate's financial troubles, Kushner's firm Kushner Companies had to take over the Puck Building. Kushner Companies thus became the sole owner of the structure. Additional tenants moved into the building during the decade. The city government stopped leasing space in the building in 1992, and Pratt expanded into some of the city government's former space on the fourth floor. Beyer Blinder Belle designed a further renovation of the building in the mid-1990s. The Bell Technology Group leased 25,000 square feet (2,300 m^{2}) in 1996, at which point the building's space was fully leased. By 1998, Kushner Companies contemplated converting the ballroom spaces on the lower stories into retail space, as the Puck Building did not have any stores at the time. The city government rezoned the building's land lot the same year, changing it from a manufacturing zone to a mixed commercial and residential zone. The structure was valued at $80 million by 2000.

Pratt moved out of the Puck Building in 2001, and New York University leased 75,000 square feet (7,000 m^{2}) at the building two years later, becoming the structure's largest tenant. NYU relocated its Wagner Graduate School of Public Service and sociology department into the building; at the time, the other tenants included Swanke Hayden Connell Architects and the catering firm New York Caterers. NYU hired Suben/Doughtery to install raised floors, consolidate some offices, and add a staircase to its space. The Puck Building was again renovated in the mid-2000s, when workers replaced the windows and added some lighting. The building was fully occupied at the time. In addition, the building's owner sought to lease out the structure's 20,600-square-foot (1,910 m^{2}) event space to a food emporium.

==== New retail space and penthouses ====
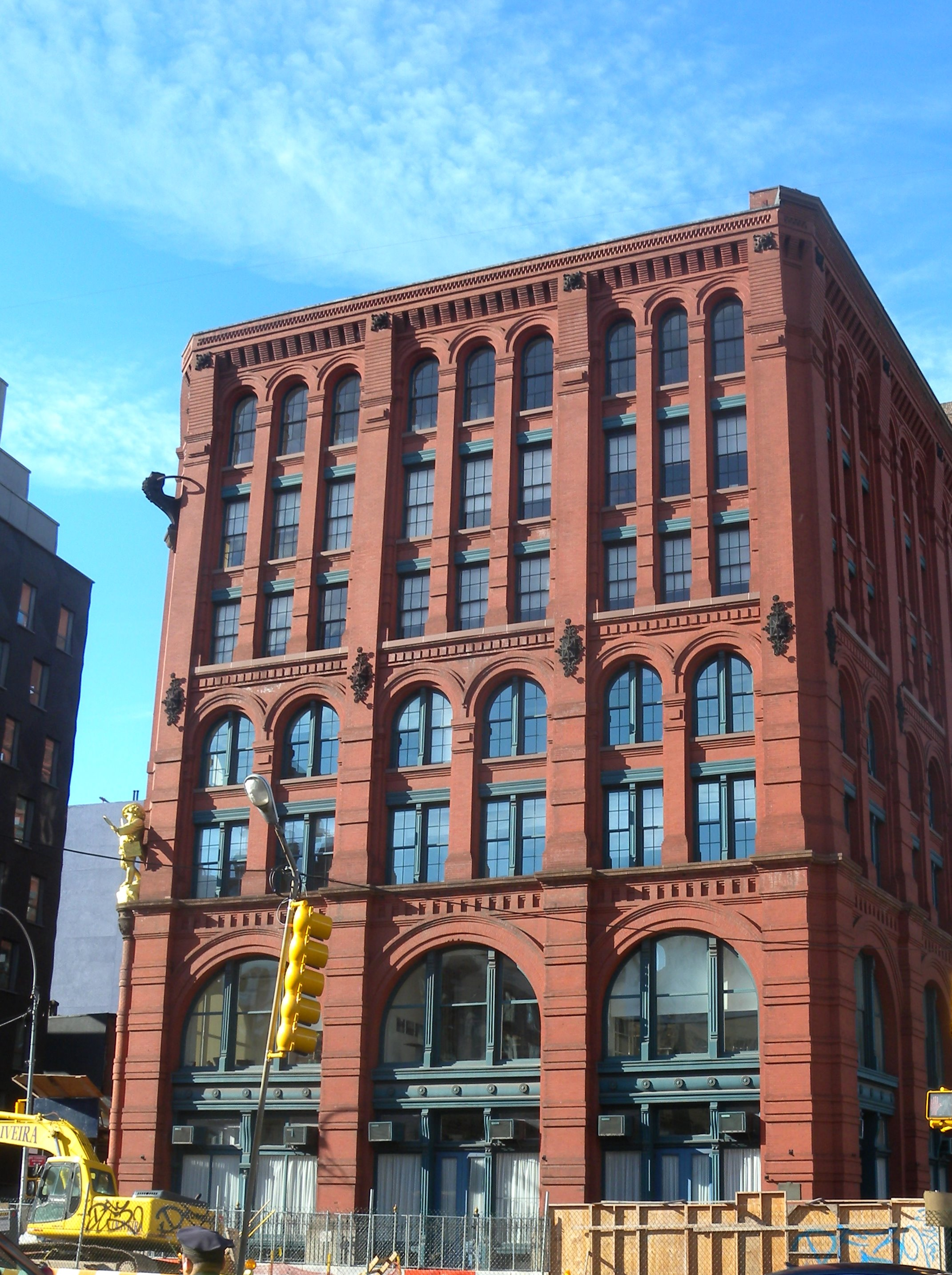
The building's Houston Street facade

The outdoor-gear store REI leased 39,000 square feet (3,600 m^{2}) in the building in 2010, with plans to open a three-story store there. Kushner Companies refinanced the building with an $80 million mortgage the same year. Part of the ground floor was cut away to make way for a staircase, and some of the original lower-story finishes were restored. Some materials such as wood ceilings, floor joists, and wainscoting were removed and reinstalled elsewhere within the storefront space, while equipment like flywheels and printing tablets was preserved. The storefront renovation was designed by the architecture firm of Callison and included an area that showcased the history of the Puck Building. The REI store opened in early December 2011, becoming the building's first retail tenant in over a century.

Meanwhile, the LPC issued a permit for the facade's renovation to Kushner Companies in May 2011. Kushner Companies' chief executive Jared Kushner announced plans that August to add penthouse apartments atop the building and hired PKSB Architects to design the residences. At the time, there was high demand for luxury residences in SoHo, and the Puck Building was among the neighborhood's most prominent structures. The original plans for Kushner's penthouses called for three apartments each on the eighth and ninth floors, as well as a single duplex apartment within a new dormer structure on the roof. The LPC rejected the initial designs in September 2011. Kushner submitted revised plans for two glass penthouse dormers in October, but the LPC also rejected these designs, saying the dormers were too large. The agency declined to accept a further modification that November for a similar reason. The LPC conditionally approved a downsized dormer in December 2011 and formally approved the renovation later that month. Ultimately, Kushner Companies met with the LPC five or six times. In the final plan, the dormer was downsized by 1,500 square feet (140 m^{2}) and shortened by 20 feet (6.1 m). In addition, the building's original parapet would be restored, preventing pedestrians from seeing the penthouse dormer from street level.

Jared Kushner was involved with the design of the building's new apartments, to the extent that he mapped out their layouts and selected the materials with which they were decorated. His wife Ivanka Trump selected the materials for the apartments' bathrooms and closets. Kushner Companies renovated the remaining space in the building as well. Kushner began marketing the condos in September 2013, asking $21 million to $60 million. At the time, Kushner anticipated that the residences would attract "connoisseurs, collectors, and those with a youthful exuberance". Office and commercial tenants continued to occupy the intermediate stories. In the 2010s, these tenants included NYU's Wagner Graduate School; a Warby Parker showroom; the Kushner family's firm Thrive Capital, along with numerous startups funded by Thrive Capital; and several media- and internet-related firms.

==== Mid-2010s to present ====
Before sales had formally launched, penthouse IV was sold in December 2013 for about $28 million; the sale was finalized the following year. The first completed penthouse was placed for sale in January 2014, and the remaining penthouses were finished that March. Kushner placed two more penthouses on sale for $57 million the same year. The Chefs Club restaurant opened within the building's first floor in late 2014. The next penthouse was not sold until early 2016, and the fourth penthouse was placed for sale that March. Kushner Companies replaced the penthouses' original brokerage, Sotheby's International Realty, with the Corcoran Group the same year. With sales of the penthouse condos lagging, Kushner Companies decided to rent out three of the apartments in 2017. Kushner and Trump had originally wanted to move into one of the apartments, although they still had not done so by 2017.

Kushner's brother Joshua and Joshua's wife Karlie Kloss bought one of the building's penthouses in 2019 before reselling it; the couple purchased the last remaining penthouse two years later, which they also resold. The Chefs Club restaurant closed during the COVID-19 pandemic in New York City, and the Major Food Club took over the space, opening the Torrisi restaurant there in 2022. After NYU relocated part of its Wagner Center out of the building in 2023, about 30,000 square feet (2,800 m^{2}) of its space was leased to the hedge fund Quadrature. In addition, OpenAI rented 90,000 square feet (8,400 m^{2}), nearly half of the building's space, in 2024. At the time, the building's other office tenants included Thrive Capital, Plaid Inc., and Cadre. REI announced in 2025 that it would close its store in the Puck Building the next year, prompting Kushner Companies to seek new tenants.

== Impact ==
The 1893 King's Handbook of New York City described the Puck Building as "a fitting monument" to Puck magazine and the J. Ottmann Lithographing Company, particularly praising the facade as giving an impression of "strength combined with lightness and graceful simplicity". Paul Goldberger wrote for The New York Times in 1978 that the Puck Building was a "fine Romanesque commercial building" with "amusing" Puck statues, and another writer for the same newspaper said in 1983 that the building "seems to fit right in with the cast-iron structures" around it. Following the building's 1983 renovation, a New York Daily News writer referred to the Puck statues as "the most outstanding feature of the building". In his 1994 book New York, a Guide to the Metropolis, Gerard Wolfe wrote that the Puck Building was "a fine example of the industrial Romanesque Revival style" of the late 19th century; similarly, Eric Nash wrote in his 1995 book New York's 50 Best Secret Architectural Treasures that the Puck Building was a "premier example of the Rundbogenstil".

Before the Puck Building was preserved as an official city landmark, it was depicted in the Municipal Art Society's 1982 exhibit "Landmarks That Aren't". After Wagner designed the Puck Building, he reused its design details for a structure at 140 Franklin Street in Tribeca. The Puck Building has been shown in various works of popular culture, For example, an exterior shot of the Puck Building is seen in the American television sitcom Will & Grace, and it is also used as a setting in the 1989 film When Harry Met Sally.... The band The National recorded parts of their 2003 album Sad Songs for Dirty Lovers in an empty penthouse in the building; two of its members, Matt Berninger and Scott Devendorf, worked there at the time. The building is also depicted in a mural in the New York Public Library Main Branch's Periodical Room.

== See also ==
- List of New York City Designated Landmarks in Manhattan below 14th Street
- National Register of Historic Places listings in Manhattan below 14th Street
