= Millennium =

Time period of 1000 years

A millennium (pl. millennia or millenniums) is a period of one thousand years.

Normally, the word is used specifically for periods of a thousand years that begin at the starting point (initial reference point) of the calendar in consideration and at later years that are whole number multiples of a thousand years after the start point. The term can also refer to an interval of time beginning on any date. Millennia sometimes have religious or theological implications (see millenarianism).

The word millennium derives from the Latin mille, meaning 'thousand', and annus, meaning 'year'.

== Debate over millennium celebrations ==
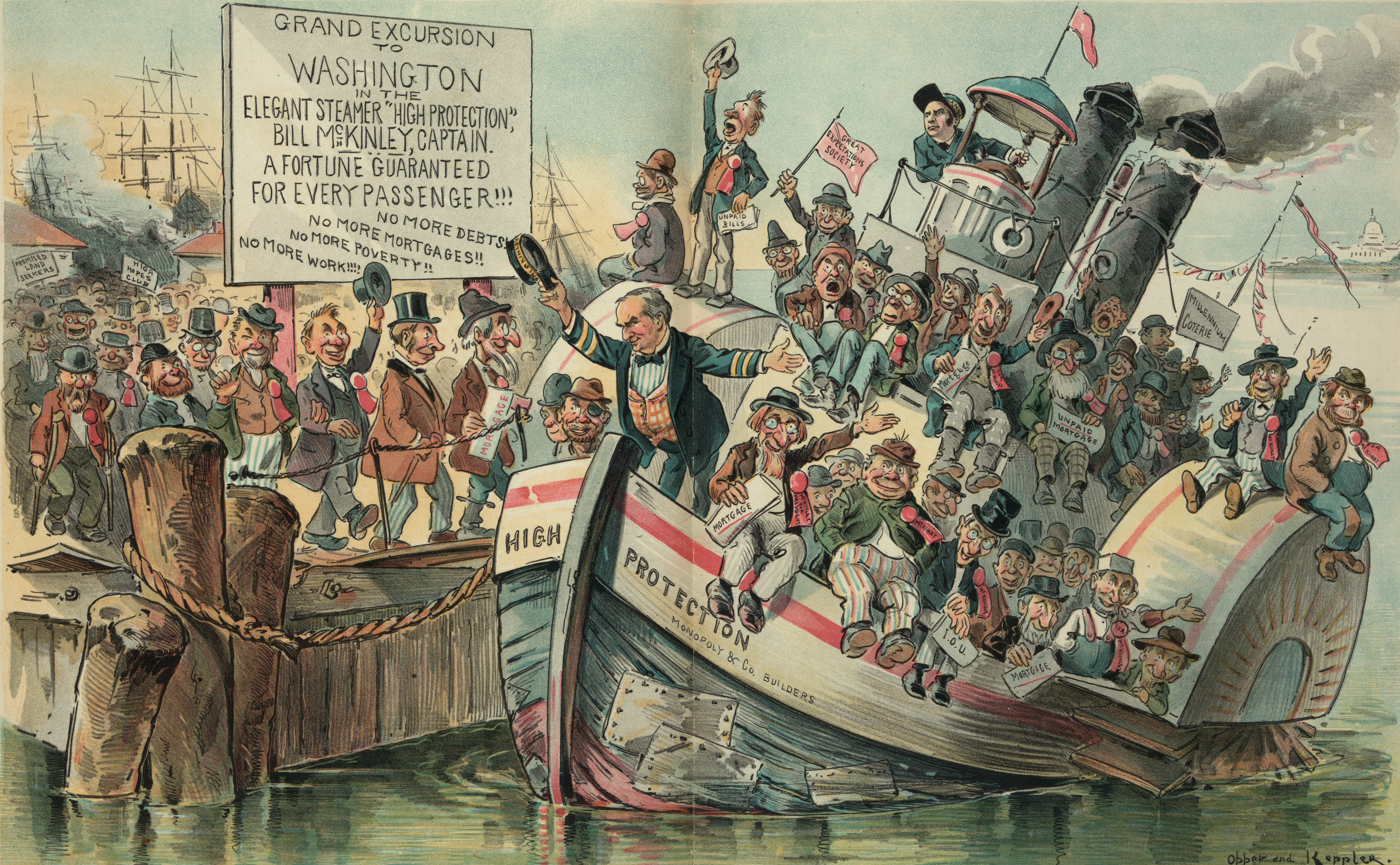
All aboard for the millennium! by Opper and Keppler, 1896

There was a public debate leading up to the celebrations of the year 2000 as to whether the beginning of that year should be understood as the beginning of the "new" millennium. Historically, there has been debate around the turn of previous decades, centuries, and millennia. The issue arises from the difference between the convention of using ordinal numbers to count years and millennia, as in "the third millennium", or using a vernacular description, as in "the two thousands". The difference of opinion comes down to whether to celebrate, respectively, the end or the beginning of the "-000" year. The first convention is common in English-speaking countries, but the latter is favoured in, for example, Sweden (tvåtusentalet, which translates literally as the two thousands period).

Those holding that the arrival of the new millennium should be celebrated in the transition from 2000 to 2001 (i.e., December 31, 2000, to January 1, 2001) argued that the Anno Domini system of counting years began with the year 1 (there was no year 0) and therefore the first millennium was from the year 1 to the end of the year 1000, the second millennium from 1001 to the end of 2000, and the third millennium beginning with 2001 and ending at the end of 3000. Similarly, the first millennium BC was from the year 1000 BC to the end of the year 1 BC.

Popular culture supported celebrating the arrival of the new millennium in the transition from 1999 to 2000 (i.e., December 31, 1999, to January 1, 2000), in that the change of the hundreds digit in the year number, with the zeroes rolling over, is consistent with the vernacular demarcation of decades by their 'tens' digit (e.g. naming the period 1980 to 1989 as "the 1980s" or "the eighties"). This has been described as "the odometer effect". Also, the "year 2000" had been a popular phrase referring to an often utopian future, or a year when stories in such a future were set. There was also media and public interest in the Y2K computer bug.

Stephen Jay Gould, in his essay "Dousing Diminutive Dennis' Debate (or DDDD = 2000)", discussed the "high" versus "pop" culture interpretation of the transition. Gould noted that the high culture, strict construction had been the dominant viewpoint at the 20th century's beginning, but that the pop culture viewpoint dominated at its end.

The start of the 21st century and 3rd millennium was celebrated worldwide at the start of the year 2000. One year later, at the start of the year 2001, the celebrations had largely returned to the usual ringing in of just another new year, although some welcomed "the real millennium", including America's official timekeeper, the U.S. Naval Observatory, as well as Cuba and Japan.

The popular approach was to treat the end of 1999 as the end of "a millennium" and to hold millennium celebrations at midnight between December 31, 1999, and January 1, 2000, with the cultural and psychological significance of the events listed above combining to cause celebrations to be observed one year earlier than the formal date.

== See also ==
- List of calendars
- List of decades, centuries, and millennia
- Century
- Millennialism
- Millennium Dome
- Millennials
