= Ludwig Baumann (disambiguation) =

Ludwig Baumann may refer to:

- Ludwig Baumann, (born 1950), Austrian opera singer
- Ludwig Baumann (architect), (1853-1936), Austrian architect
- Ludwig Baumann and Company, former American furniture retailer
