= Albert Wagner (architect) =

German-American architect (1848–1898)

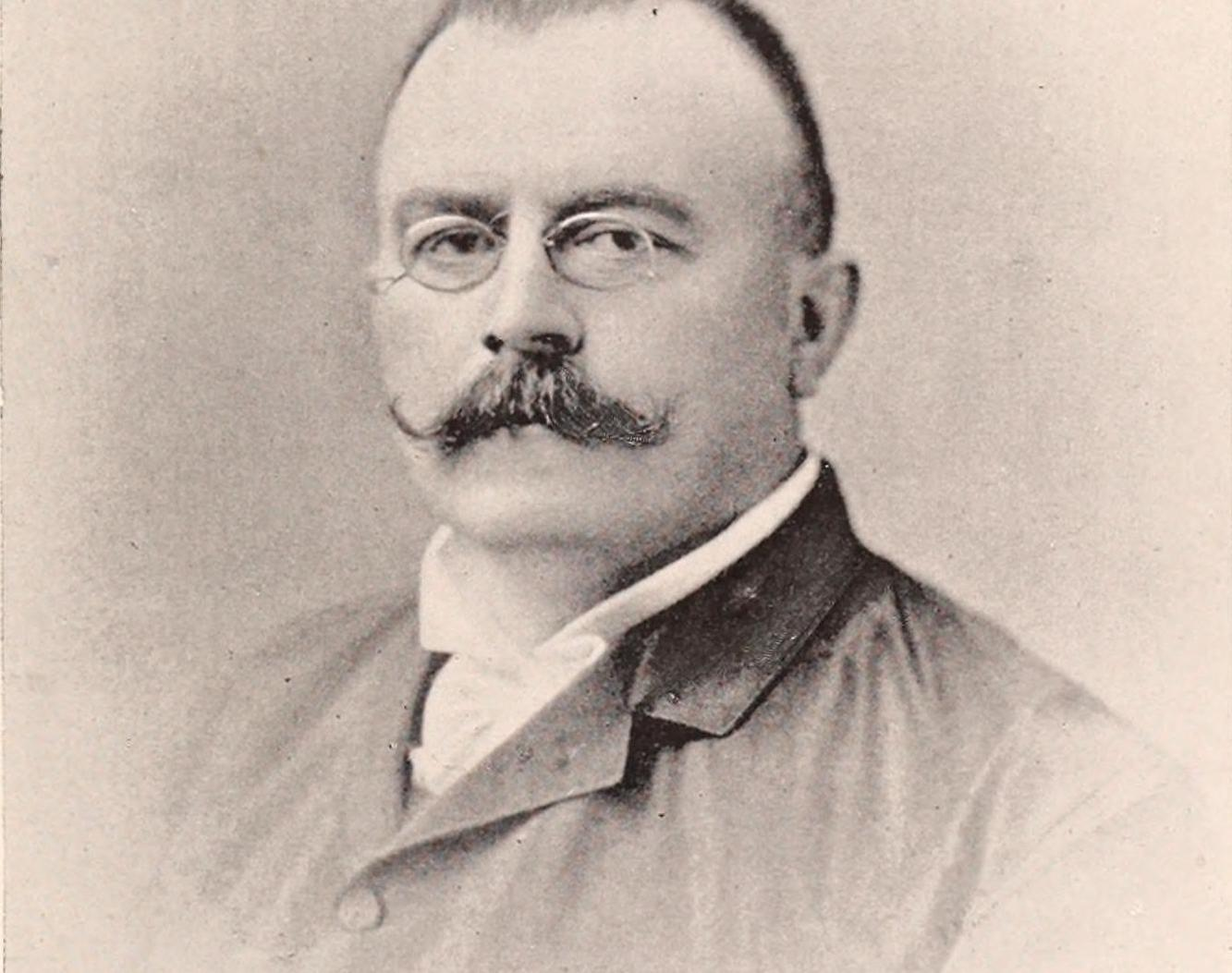
- Born: March 14, 1848; Poessneck, Germany
- Died: August 24, 1898; New York
- Education: Polytechnic of Stuffgart and Munich Academy
- Occupation: Architect
- Buildings: Puck Building

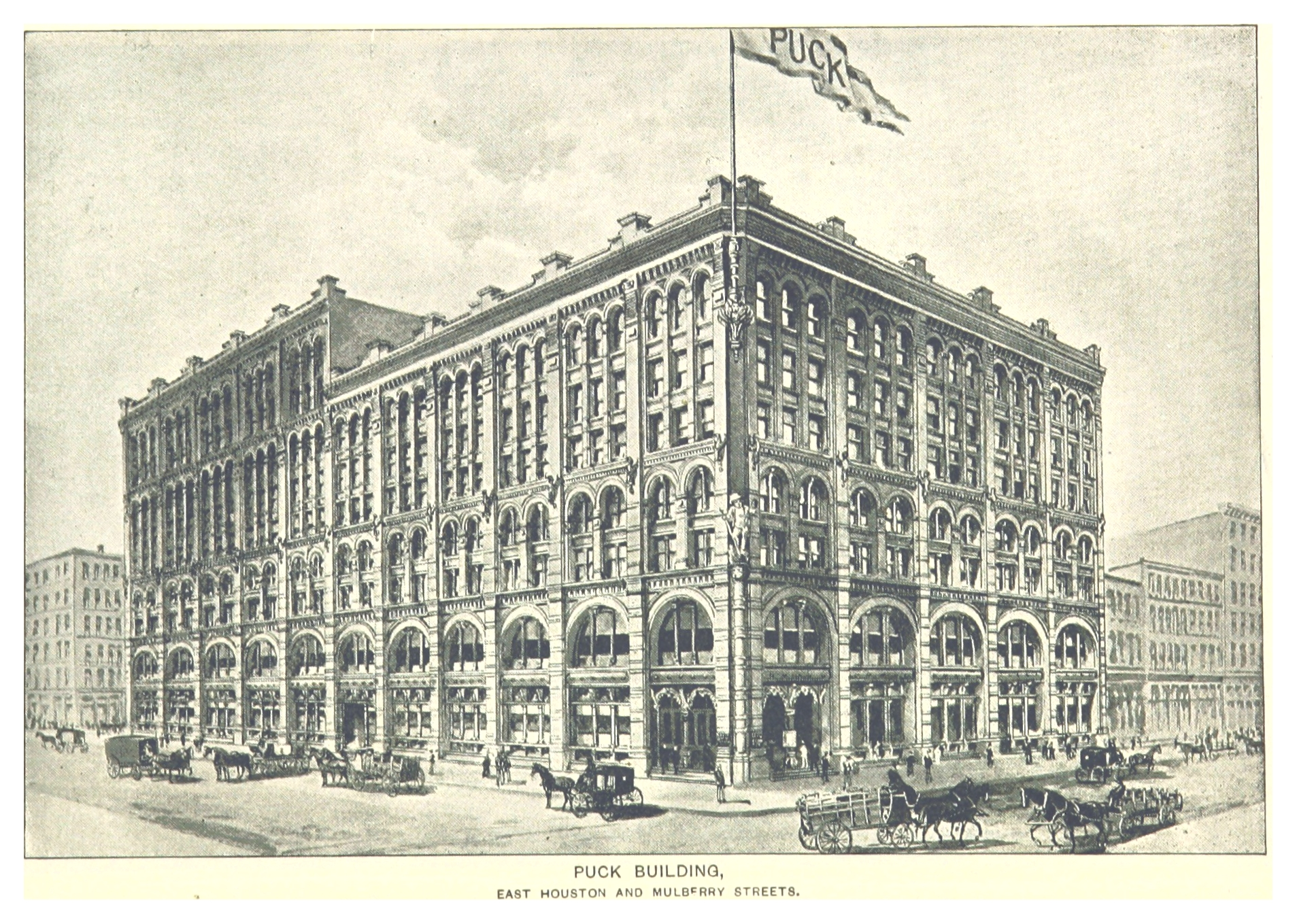
Illustration of the Puck Building from the Handbook of New York City by Moses King

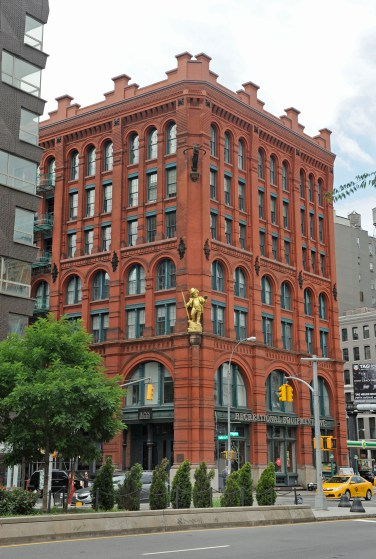
A corner of the Puck Building

Albert Wagner (March 14, 1848 – August 24, 1898) was an architect from Germany who worked in New York City. Born in Poessneck, Germany, he moved to New York in 1871. He designed the Puck Building, expanded years later according to designs by his relative Herman Wagner. The building housed Puck magazine. Wagner also designed 140 Franklin Street (1887), a building later converted to lofts, and 134–136 Spring Street, where clothing businesses were housed. He used terra cotta, Romanesque style stone and brickwork, and ornate ironwork in his buildings.

Wagner's office was at 67 University Place. He had a son named Frederick Lewis Wagner. Wagner died in on August 24, 1898 in New York.

== Work ==
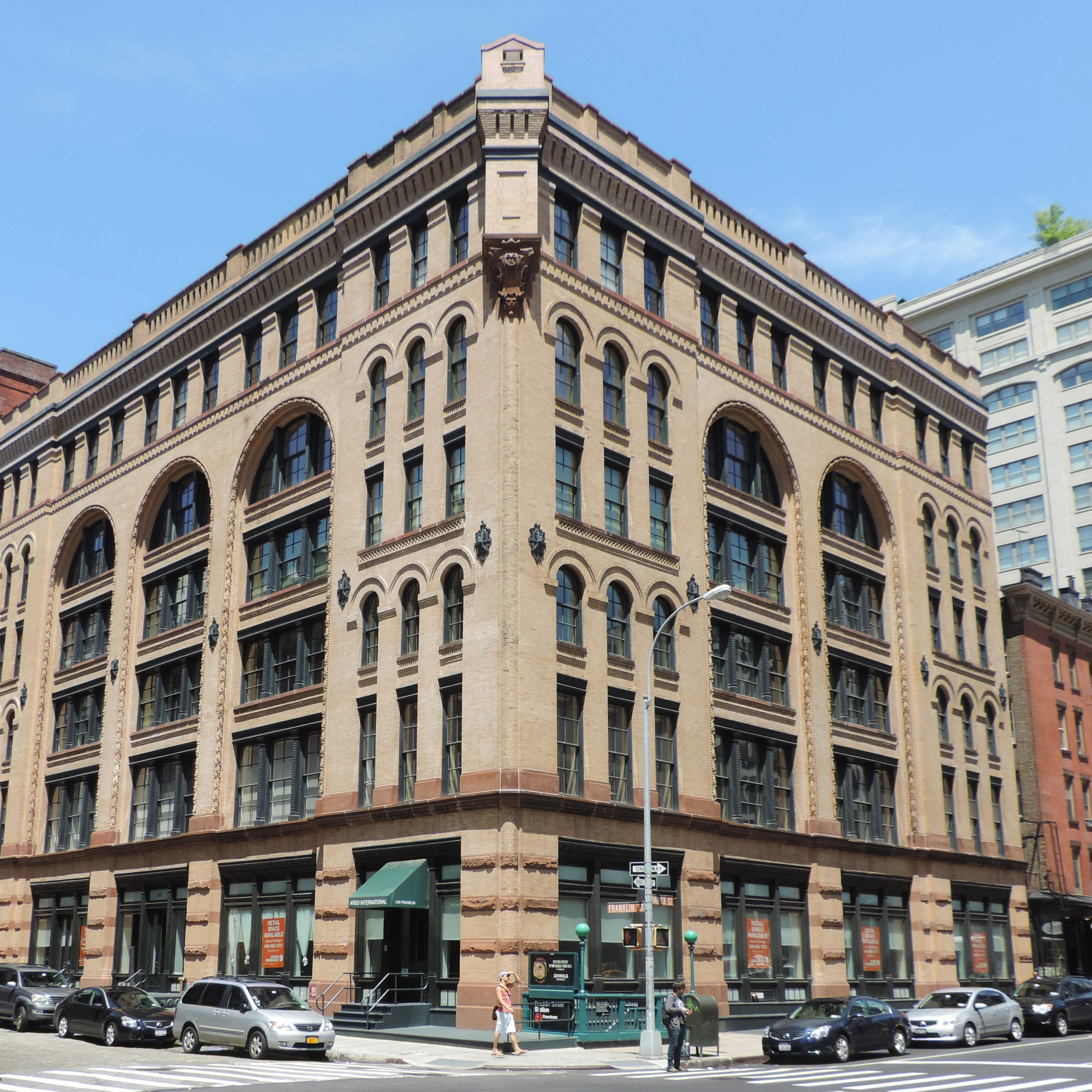
140 Franklin Street

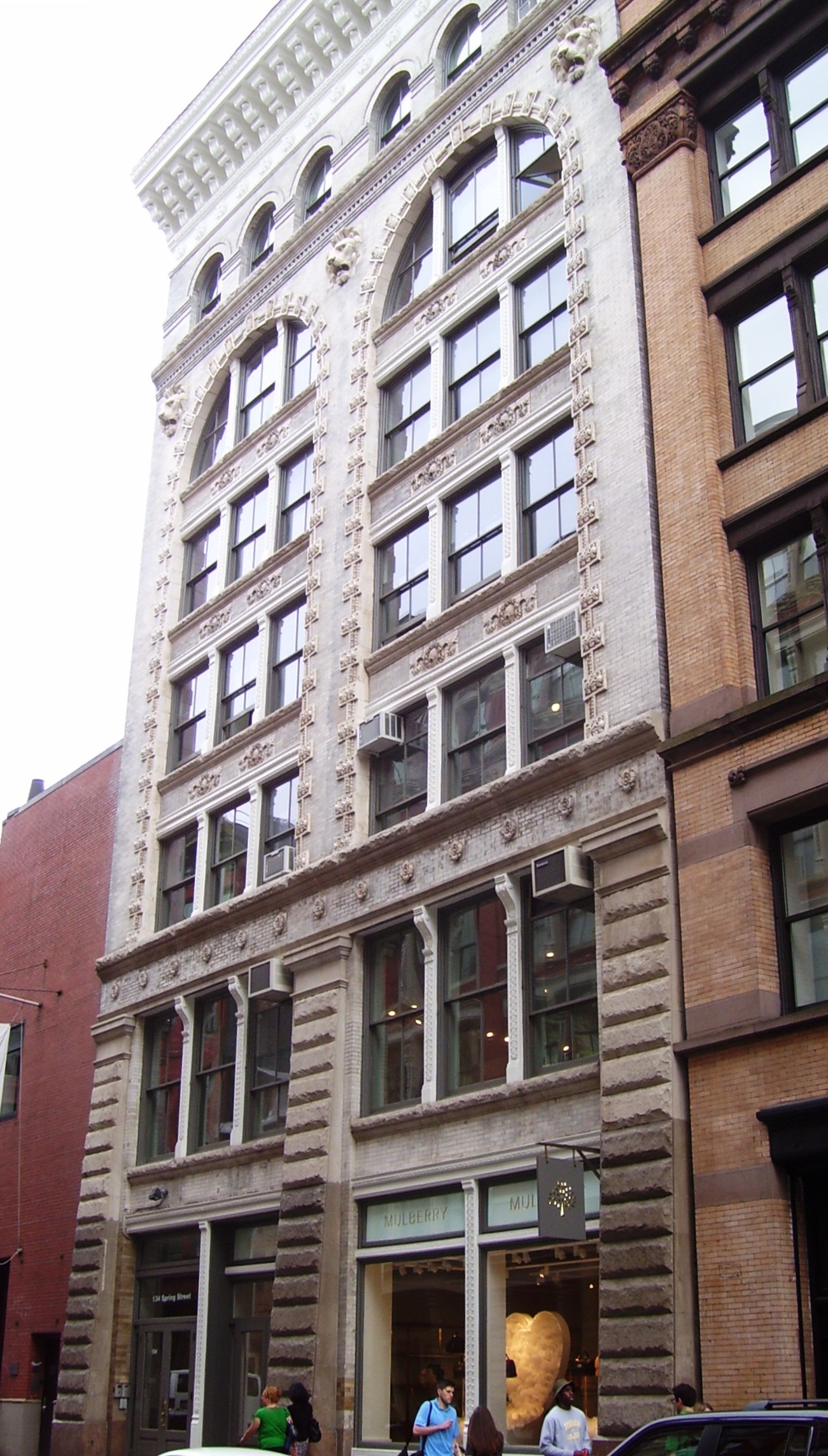
134 Spring Street

- Puck Building bounded by West Houston Street, Mulberry Street, Jersey Street and Lafayette Street
- 140 Franklin Street
- Storage Building 260-266 West 36th Street.
- 134 Spring Street (1896), in the Soho - Cast Iron Historic District
- 53–55 Elizabeth Street, a 7-story Philadelphia face brick and iron building for Phillip Stroebel & Sons.

- 37 East 12 Street, 10-story brick building with Romanesque facade (1896), originally for variety of manufacturing companies including shirtwaist.

- 233–236 East 59th Street renovation
- "Down Town Power House" cable station, Bayard Street and Bowery to Elizabeth Street, a Third Avenue Railroad Company project
- Ludwig Baumann & Company Building, West 35th Street & 8th Avenue (1897)
