= Peter Gee =

British artist (1932–2005)

Peter Gee (1932–2005) was a British-born artist and developer who spent most of his life living and working in New York City. He was active in the pop art movement of the 60s.

== Biography ==
Gee was born on 23 July 1932, in Leicestershire, England. He was interested in drawing as a child and worked as a graphic designer for the British army when he joined at the age of 18. By the end of the 50s, he had exhibited at the Denise Rene Gallery in Paris, where he lived briefly, and the Axiom Gallery in London. He came to the US in 1962.

Throughout the 60s, Gee experienced a high degree of success as a pop artist in Manhattan. His work from this era has been collected by The Museum of Modern Art in both New York City and Kyoto, The Smithsonian and the Library of Congress in Washington, D.C., and The Victoria and Albert Museum in London. Gee exhibited with Andy Warhol and Robert Indiana for the "Word and Image" show in 1968 at the Museum of Modern Art. During this time, he was also teaching classes at the New School, the School of Visual Arts, and the Harvard Architectural School.

Gee formed his close friendship with fashion designer Betsey Johnson in the 60s. He designed the art and packages which she used in her Soho-based store Paraphernalia, and Johnson's lips are the subject of many of his silkscreens and giclées.

Gee and his wife Elsie had a son named Brandon in 1971. They later divorced, and Gee became involved with antique-dealer Olga Opsahl. They had two children, Odin and Harry, born in 1981 and 1985. In 1989, Gee married Olga at the Round Hill resort near Montego Bay in Jamaica, where he owned property, exhibited his work, and occasionally taught color theory classes to vacationers.

== Art ==
Gee was mainly concerned with color theory throughout his life. Until the 80s, his preferred medium for exploring color combinations was silkscreen printing. He used a series of basic shapes in various combinations, usually bulls-eye targets and very simplified daisies which he would print individually, in long strips, or in larger rectangles which combined many strips of differently colored daisies and targets. He also printed silkscreens of Betsey Johnson and her colleague Penelope Tree, Betsey Johnson's lips, Martin Luther King Jr., and the famous Puck Building in New York City. Gee often printed on silver mylar and metallic gold paper.

Later in his life, Gee began to paint with oils. Some of his paintings are color experiments in the same vein as his silkscreens- they involve simple and clearly defined shapes, usually squares and rectangles. Others are still lives, interiors, and nudes.

Gee began to make giclée prints using a computer and archival inks some years before his death. Some of these giclées were reproductions or were intended as reproductions, but he considered many of them to be new and original work involving colors that he had been unable to achieve or that he had not thought to try with a silkscreen process decades before. After Gee died, his family and printer made arrangements to complete some limited editions of his giclées using the computer files which Gee had created during his lifetime.

== Work in development and renovation ==
In addition to pursuing his artistic career, Peter Gee renovated and restored twenty-some historic and unusual buildings in Soho and Tribeca. One of these was the Puck Building, which he operated with his partner Paul Serra in the 80s and early nineties. In 1994, Gee bought the Cape Cod School of Art in Provincetown Massachusetts and began to restore the buildings while living in the old student dormitories with his family. He taught Summer classes at the reopened school, which he renamed the Hawthorne School of Art. The school was resold after his death.

== Death ==
In late 2005, Peter Gee fell ill and was incorrectly diagnosed with walking pneumonia by his physician. On 1 December 2005, he died of lymphoma at the age of 73. He is survived by his wife Olga Opsahl Gee, his sister Mavis Finnemore, and his sons Brandon, Odin, and Harry. Odin Gee manages his father's estate.
