= Joseph Keppler =

Austrian-born American cartoonist and caricaturist (1838–1894)

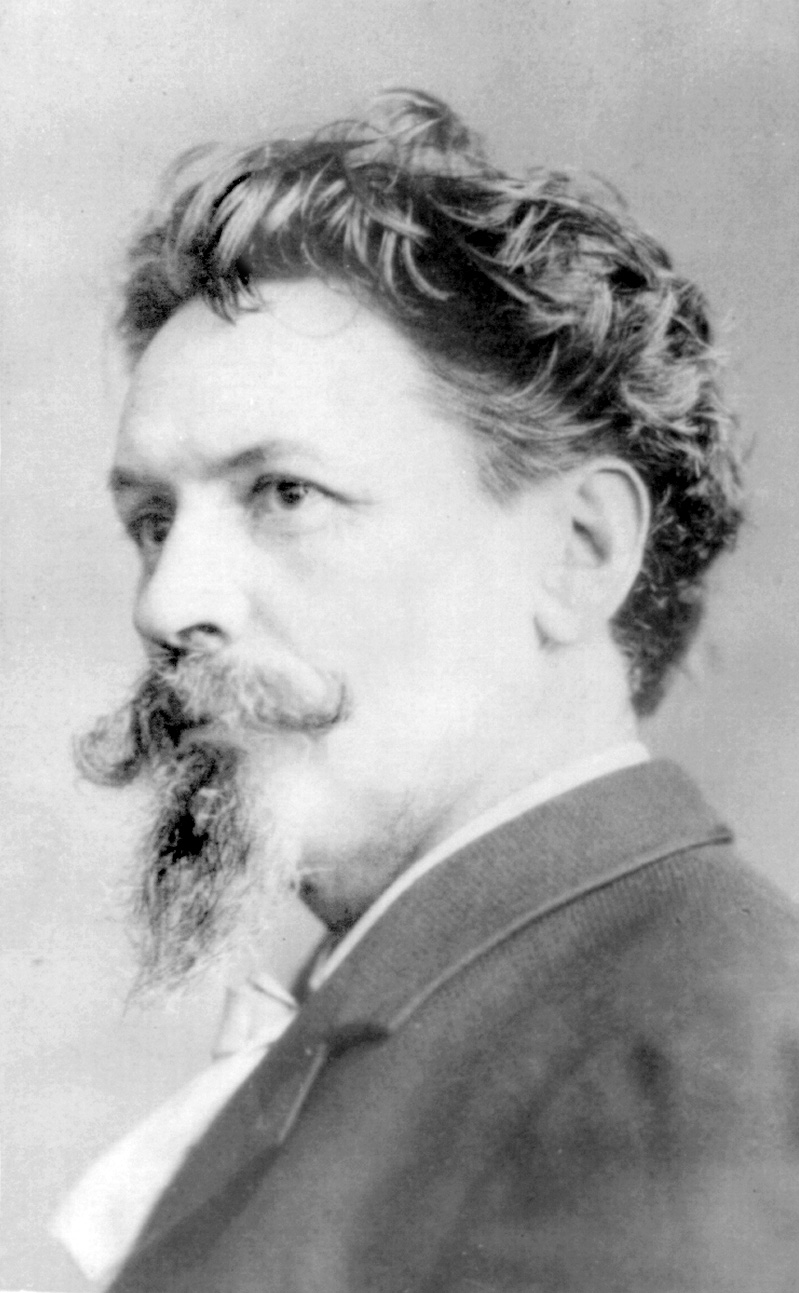
- Photo portrait, 1880
- Born: Joseph Ferdinand Keppler; February 1, 1838; Vienna, Austrian Empire
- Died: February 19, 1894 (aged 56); New York City, U.S.
- Employer: Frank Leslie's Illustrated Newspaper (unknown dates)
- Known for: Cartooning
- Notable work: Puck

Joseph Ferdinand Keppler (February 1, 1838 – February 19, 1894) was an Austrian-born American cartoonist and caricaturist who greatly influenced the growth of satirical cartooning in the United States.

Joseph F. Keppler was the father of Udo J. Keppler (1872–1956), American political cartoonist, publisher, and advocate for Native Americans.

== Early life ==
He was born in Vienna. His parents were bakers, and his talent is said to have first manifested itself in his cake decorations. He studied art at the Academy of Fine Arts Vienna and later contributed comic drawings to the Vienna humor magazine Kikeriki (Cock-a-doodle-do).

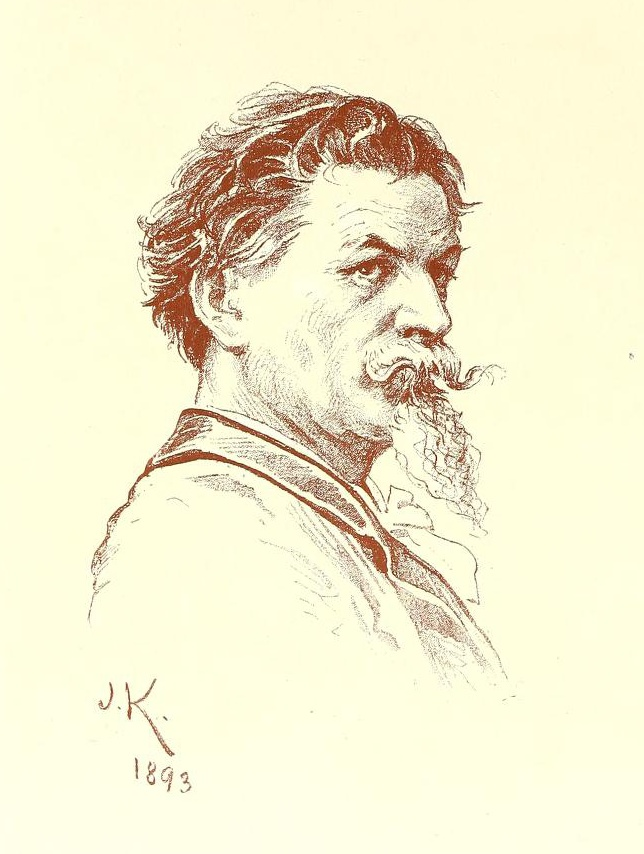
Self portrait, 1893

Unable to make a living from his art in Vienna, he joined a theatrical troupe as a scene painter and then as a comedian, traveling with them in the Tyrol and Italy. His ability to restore old paintings gained for him some extra money in some of the monasteries on the way. He was a charming companion, an excellent story-teller, and immediately popular wherever he went. In 1864, he married the Viennese actress Minna Rubens. Meanwhile, his father, who had come to the States to escape the European Revolutions of 1848, had established himself as the proprietor of a general store in a little town in northern Missouri. Hearing glowing accounts from America, young Keppler and his wife decided to emigrate.

== St. Louis ==
After visiting his father, Keppler made his way to St. Louis in 1867 and renewed his career as an actor. In 1869, he helped launch the German-American cartoon weekly, Die Vehme, which lasted for a year. It was followed by Frank und Frei, which lasted six months. In March 1871, he attempted another cartoon weekly, Puck, which lasted until August 1872.

After the death of his wife in 1870, Keppler married Pauline Pfau in 1871, the union producing three children, Udo, Irma and Olga.

== New York City ==
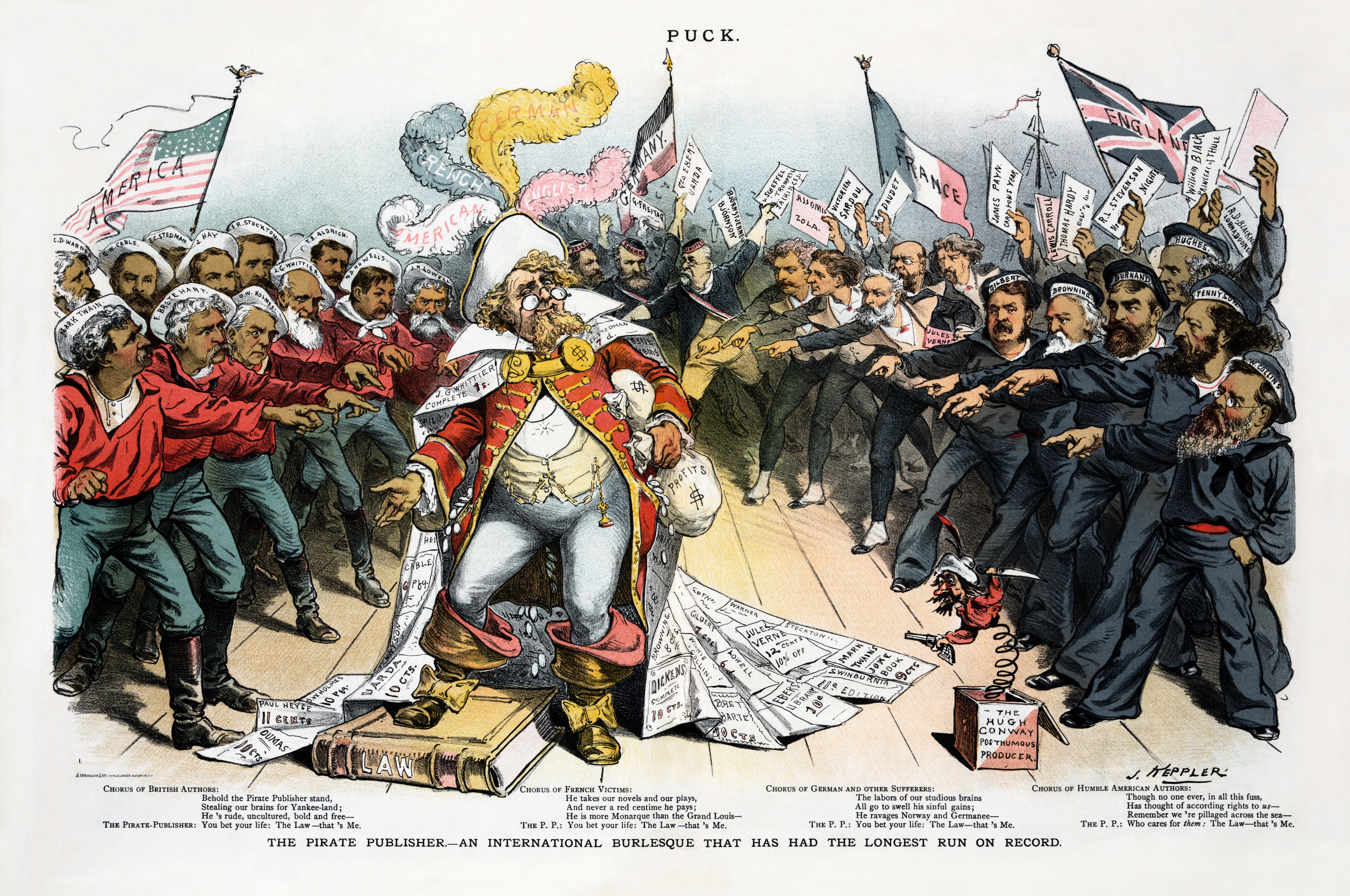
The Pirate Publisher— An International Burlesque that has the Longest Run on Record (1886), satirizing copyright laws that operated in single countries only, and thus permitted newly published works from one country to be published in another without paying the authors

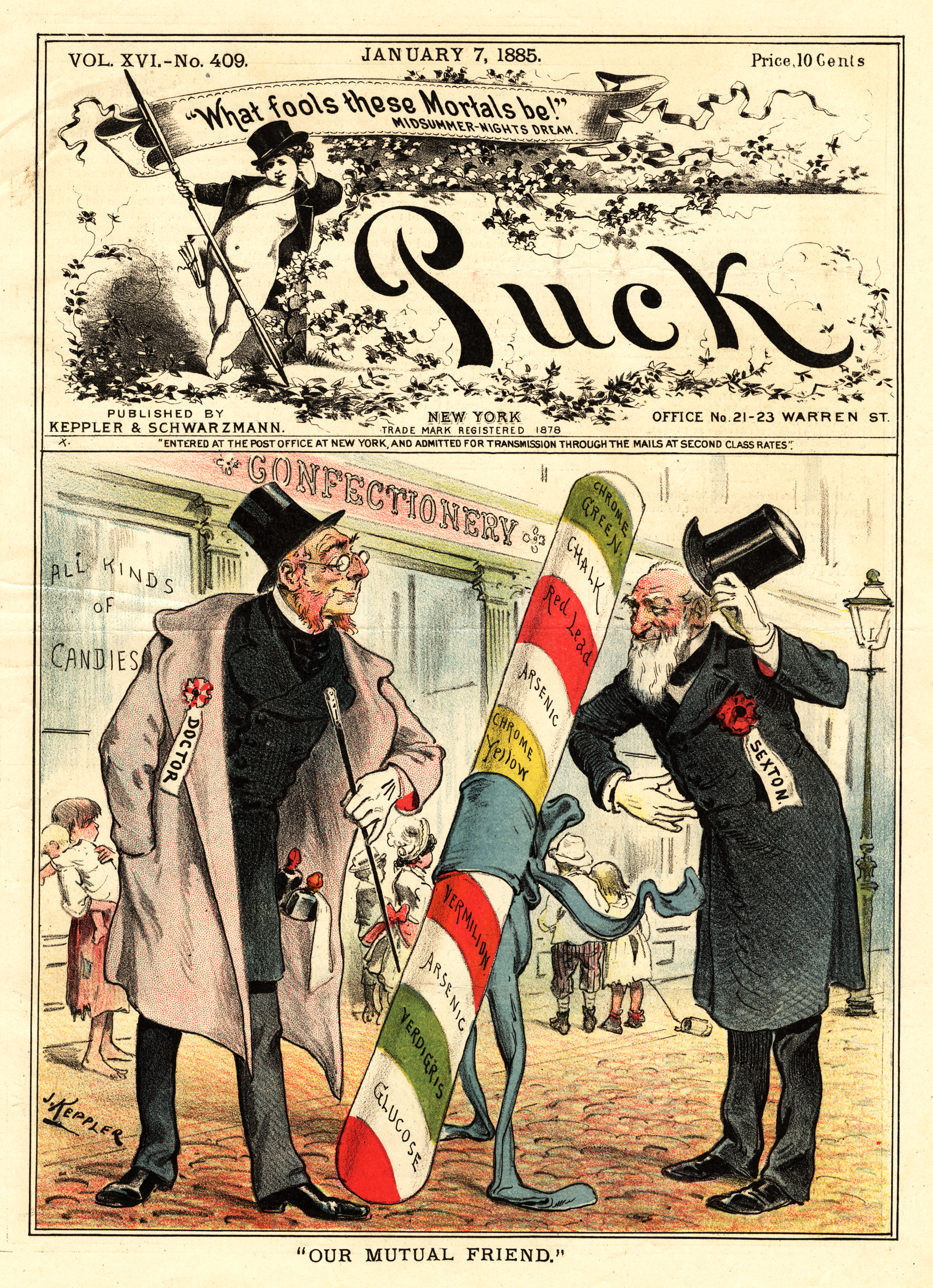
"Our Mutual Friend", January 7, 1885, cover warning of the dangers of color additives used in candy

In the fall of 1872, he moved with his wife and son to New York city and was soon working for Frank Leslie's publishing house. Starting in 1874, he began contributing political cartoons to Frank Leslie's Illustrated Newspaper. In September 1876 he and fellow Frank Leslie employee Adolph Schwarzmann resurrected Puck for the New York German-American audience and then introduced an English-language version the following year. Keppler's main delight was in producing cartoons criticizing President Ulysses S. Grant, and the political corruption of his administration. His cartoons were famous for their caustic wit, generating much publicity for Puck and pioneering the use of color lithography for caricature. Much of his success was due to a clever adaptation of classical and historical subjects to his criticisms of modern life.

Keppler's opinions and wit endeared him to large sections of the American public. His illustrations cast light on complex politics, making issues clear to the average voter. Puck did not shy away from criticism of the administration and by influencing the perceptions of the voting public, certainly altered the course of American political history.

In one of his cartoons entitled "Looking Backward" (Puck, January 11, 1893), he depicted a group of nouveau riche hypocritally protesting the arrival of an eastern European immigrant — notwithstanding the fact that the "protesters" themselves had been immigrants or sons of immigrants.

Initially Keppler drew all the Puck cartoons. When his workload became too much, he made use of several talented artists including Frederick Burr Opper, James A. Wales, Bernhard Gillam, Eugene Zimmerman, C. J. Taylor, and others.

== Chicago ==
In 1893, he took charge of a special World's Fair Puck published weekly for six months on the grounds of the World's Columbian Exposition. The stress and exhaustion of that experience damaged his health, and he died the next year in New York.

== Udo Keppler ==
Keppler's son, Udo J. Keppler (1872–1956), was also a political cartoonist and co-owner for Puck magazine, a collector of aboriginal American artifacts and an activist for aboriginal Americans. He had his name changed to Joseph Keppler Jr. in honor of his father. He was an honorary chief of the Seneca nation.
