= Ludwig Baumann and Company =

Company that no longer exists

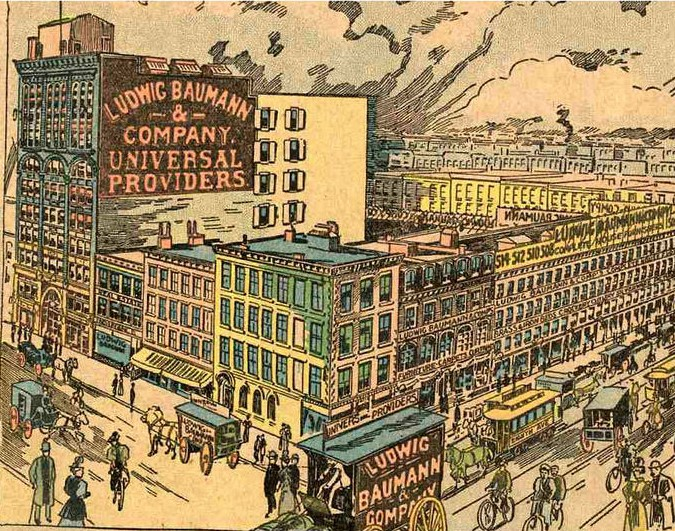
Ludwig Baumann & Co. flagship store on 8th Avenue New York, NY (1897).

Ludwig Baumann and Company (Ludwig Baumann & Co.) was a prominent American home furniture chain in the nineteenth and twentieth centuries. At its peak, it was the largest furniture provider in the United States.

== History ==
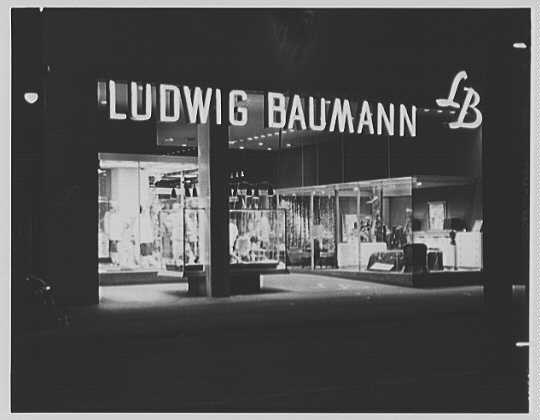
Ludwig Baumann & Co. outlet store in Jamaica, NY (1951).

Bohemian immigrant brothers Ludwig Baumann and Albert Baumann opened a small New York City furniture store named Baumann Brothers in 1876. However, the partnership between Ludwig and Albert dissolved in 1888. Ludwig then opened his own furniture store under the name Ludwig Baumann & Company which quickly grew into one of the largest furniture providers in New York City specializing in quality and affordable home furniture.

In 1897, Ludwig Baumann & Co. opened its flagship store on West 35th Street & 8th Avenue which was the largest New York retail furniture store at that time. Construction of the 8th Avenue store was completed by architect Albert Wagner at a cost of around $175,000, the equivalent of about $6,200,000 in 2023. After Ludwig's death in 1904, the company passed to his son Sidney J. Baumann. During this time, Ludwig Baumann & Co. opened outlets across the New York City area earning the reputation of "America's Greatest Furniture House." Following the death of Sidney in 1936, the company passed to his son Walter S. Baumann. Ludwig Baumann & Co. continued to expand by opening additional outlets across the country and selling new goods such as men's and women's apparel. The company also continued to boast record sales with over $15,000,000 in 1947, the equivalent of over $200,400,000 in 2023. Ludwig Baumann & Co. was ultimately purchased by Spear & Co. in 1952 creating the largest furniture provider in the United States at that date. Spear & Co. closed Ludwig Baumann's flagship 8th Avenue store in 1954 before selling off other Ludwig Baumann stores shortly thereafter.

== Notable Innovations ==
Ludwig Baumann & Co. pioneered the instalment payment method for retail purchases. The company's "liberal credit system" extended a line of credit to consumers who previously could not afford retail furniture and then had them pay off the credit in small weekly payments. The New York Tribune estimated that as of 1897 there were at least 100,000 Ludwig Baumann & Co. credit customers. The instalment payment method was credited for the early success of the company. Ludwig Baumann & Co. was also a first to utilize mail order which revolutionized retail sales.
