= Udo Keppler =

American cartoonist (1872–1956)

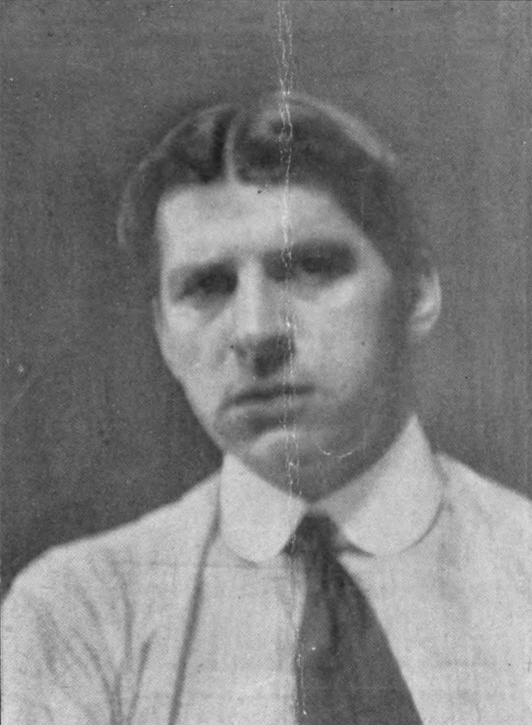
- Keppler c. 1903
- Born: April 4, 1872; St. Louis, Missouri
- Died: July 4, 1956 (aged 84); La Jolla, California
- Known for: Cartooning
- Notable work: Puck

Udo J. Keppler (April 4, 1872 – July 4, 1956), known from 1894 as Joseph Keppler Jr., was an American political cartoonist, publisher, and Native American advocate. The son of cartoonist Joseph Keppler (1838–1894), who founded Puck magazine, the younger Keppler also contributed cartoons, and became co-owner of the magazine after his father's death, when he changed his name to Joseph Keppler. He was also a collector of Native American artifacts, and was adopted by the Seneca Nation, where he became an honorary chief and given the name Gyantwaka.

Keppler was born in St. Louis, Missouri. He graduated from the Columbia Institute in 1888, and studied in Germany in 1890 and 1891. He was with Puck from 1890 to 1914. He married Louise (Lulu) Eva Bechtel, daughter of wealthy brewer George Bechtel, on April 4, 1895, a marriage opposed by his mother and sisters. He sold Puck in December 1913, remaining art director for another four months. He later contributed to Judge and Leslie's Weekly until 1915. He retired in 1920, and in 1946 moved to La Jolla, California, where he died on July 4, 1956.

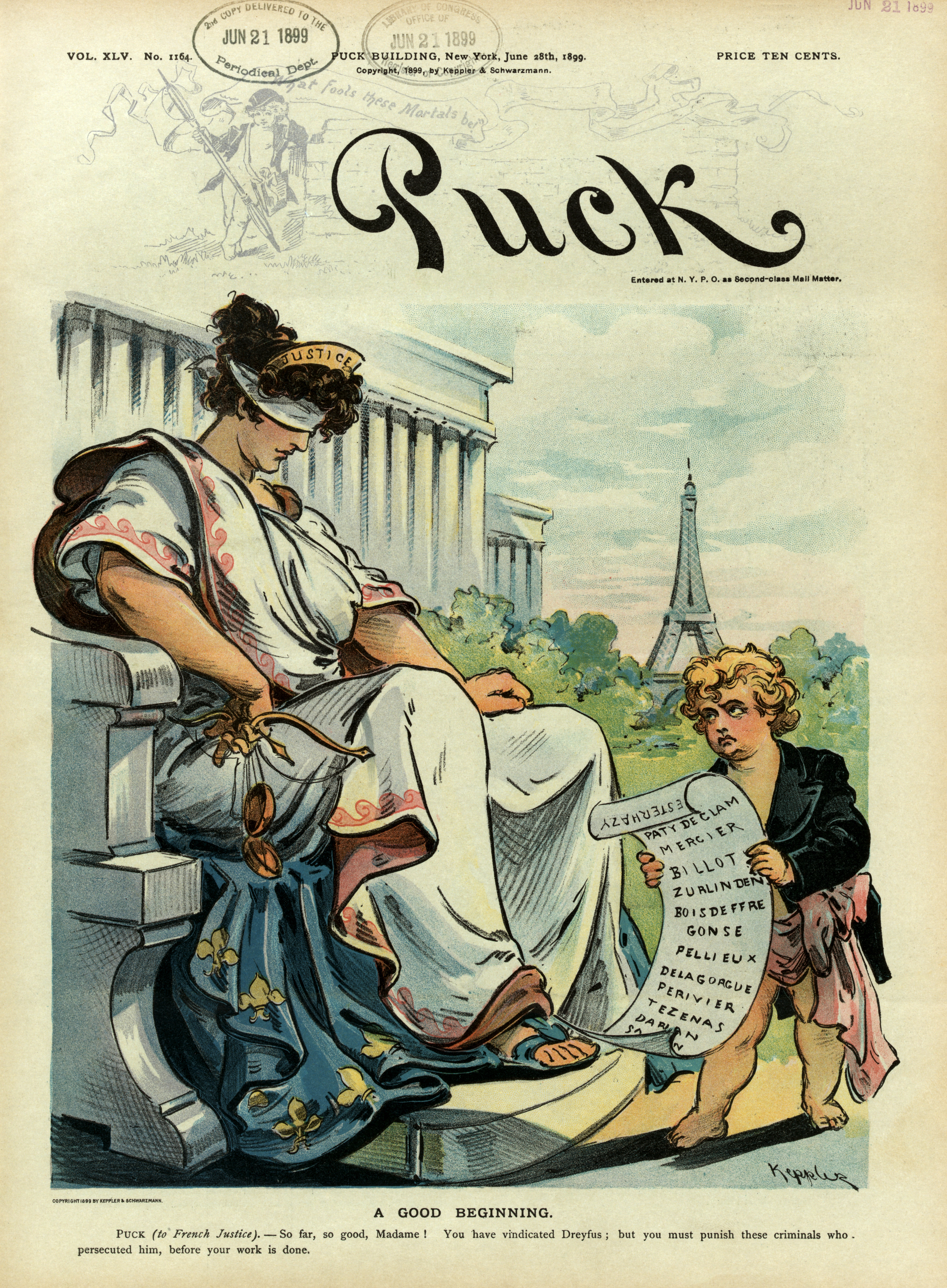
Puck cover, June 28, 1899

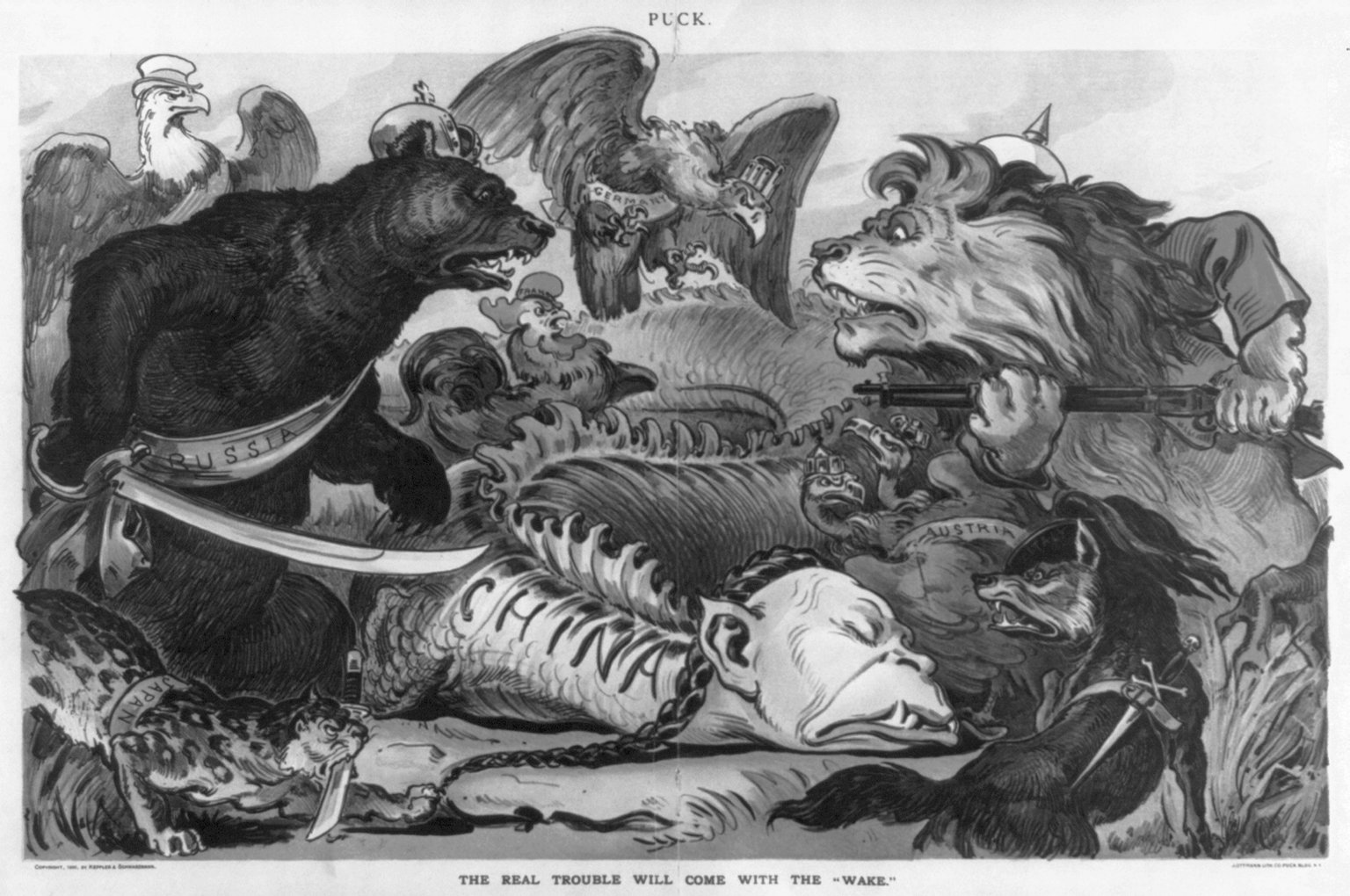
The real trouble will come with the "Wake." (1900 Aug. 15)

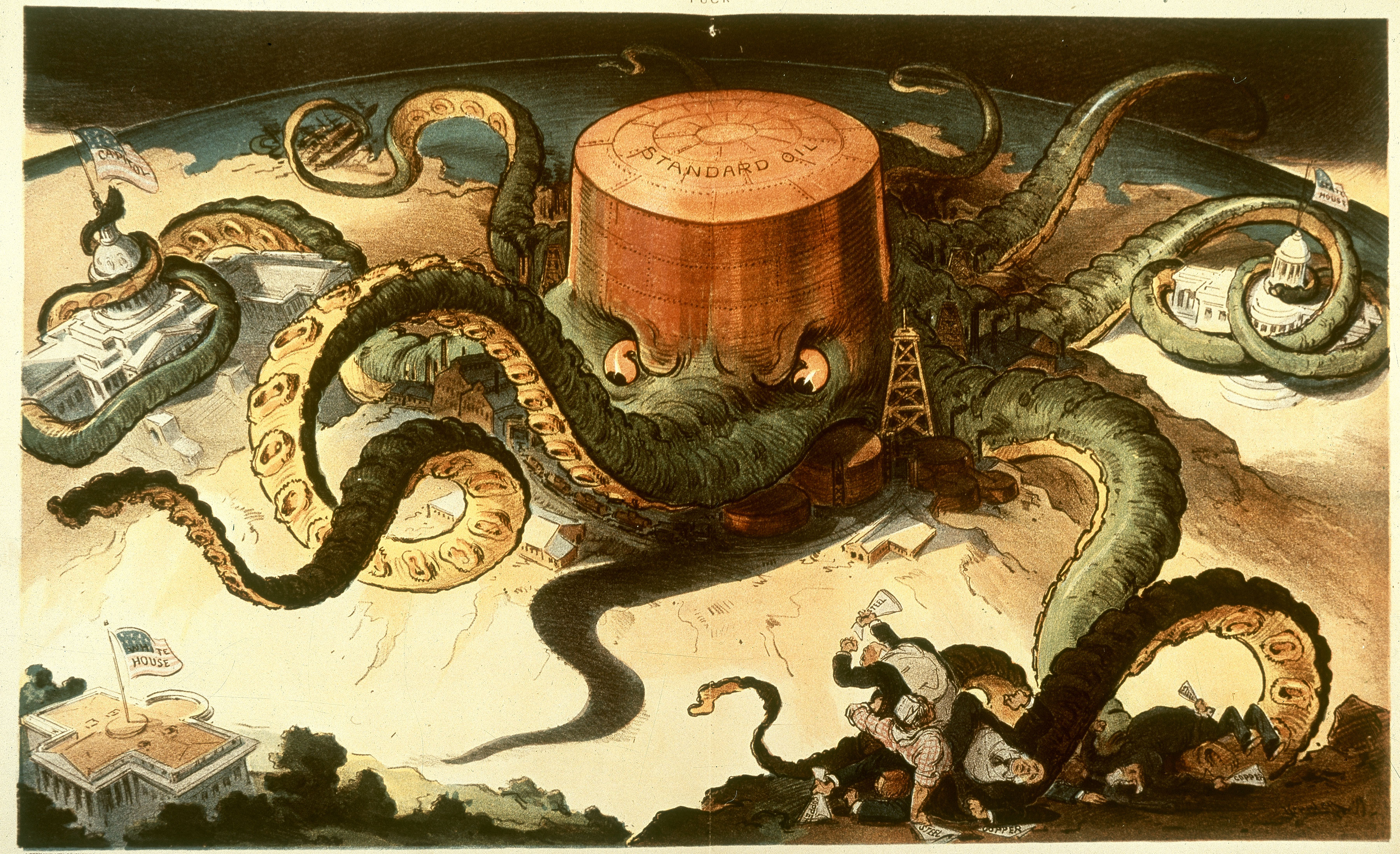
"Next!" (1904), an octopus representing Standard Oil with tentacles wrapped around U.S. Congress and steel, copper, and shipping industries, and reaching for the White House

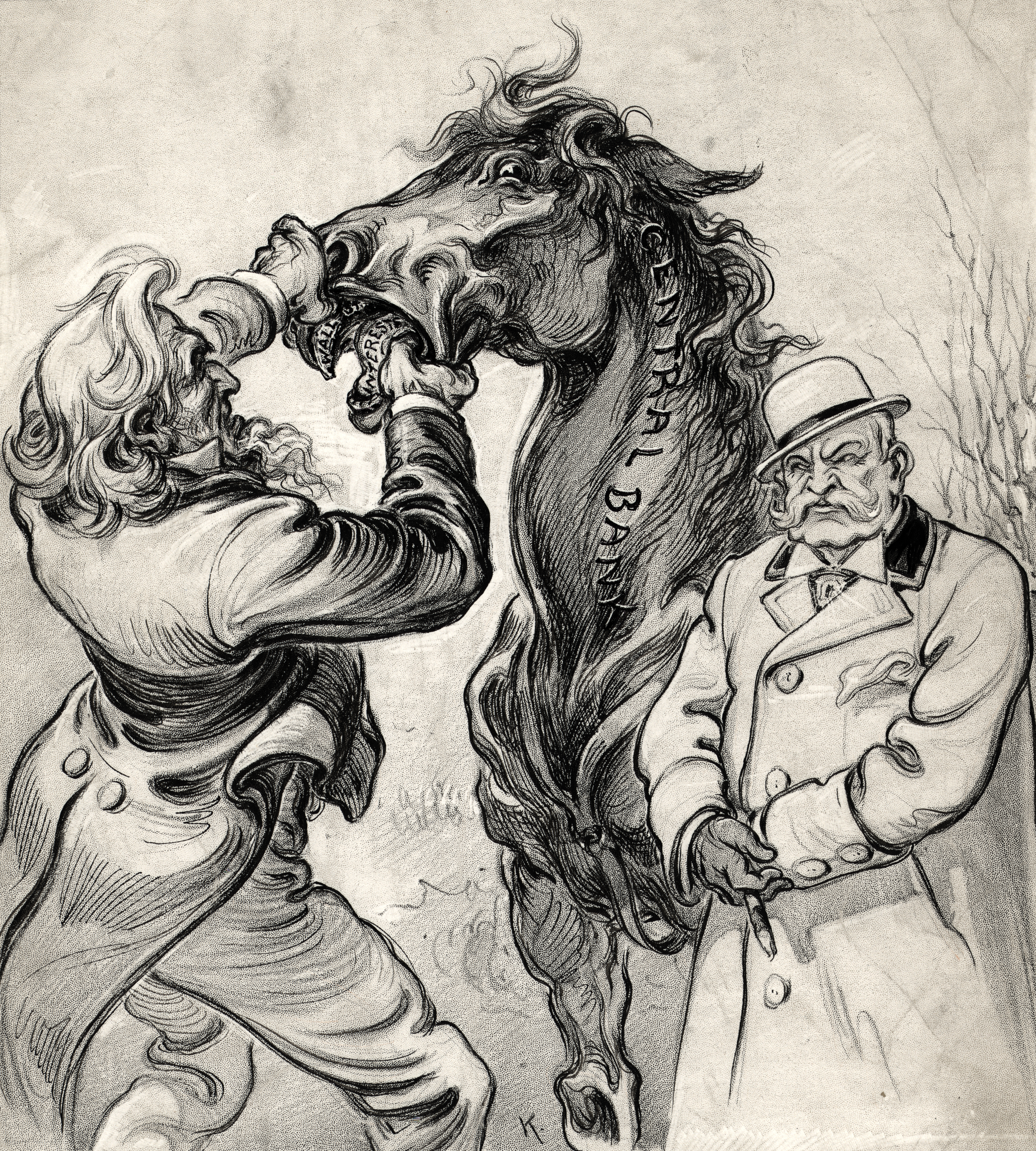
"Always Look a Gift Horse in the Mouth" (1909)

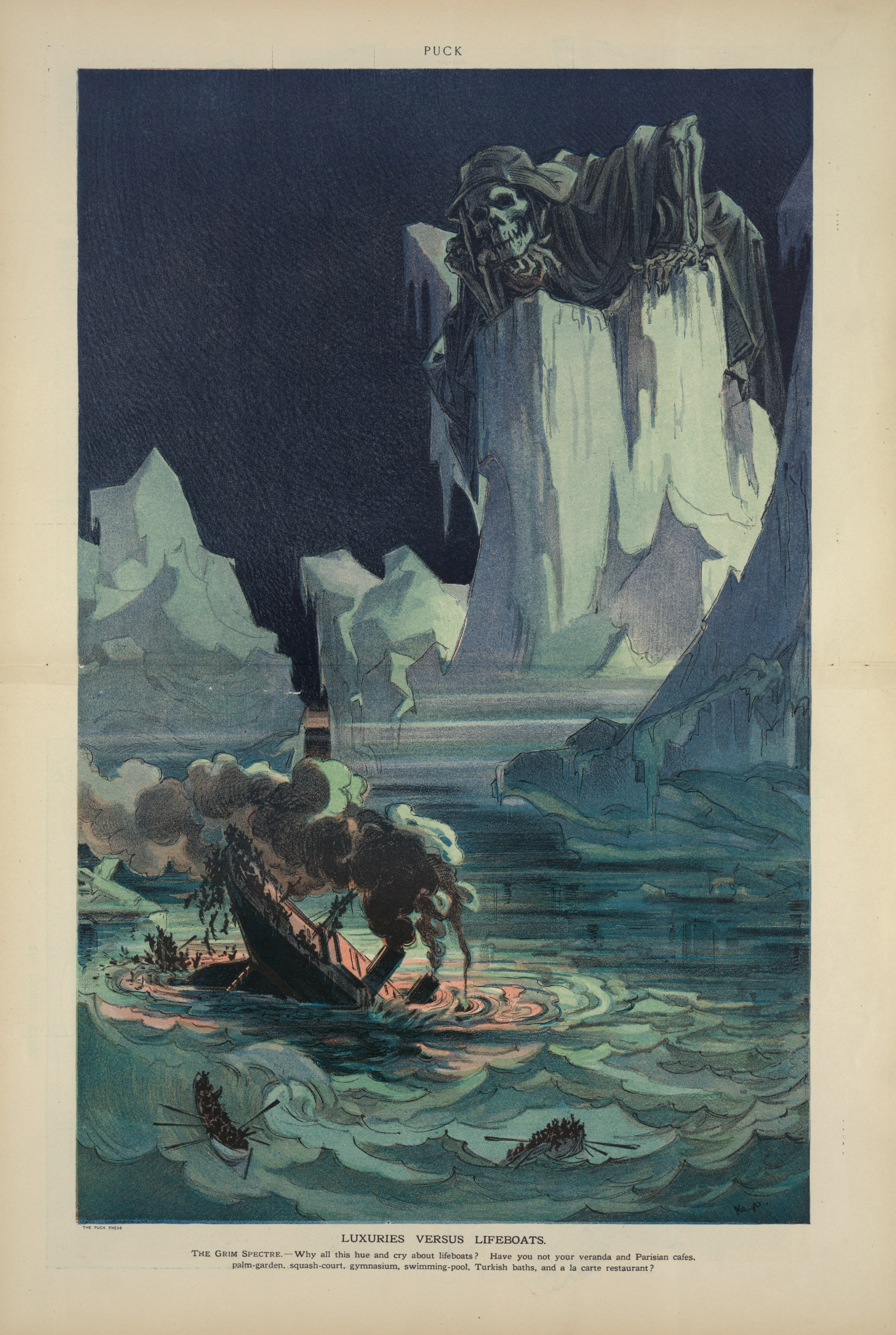
"Luxuries versus lifeboats" (1912), about the sinking of the Titanic
