= Gillam =

Gillam is an English surname and it may refer to:

- Barbara Gillam, Australian psychologist
- Beatrice Gillam (1920–2016), English ecologist
- Bernhard Gillam (1856–1896), American political cartoonist (Puck, Judge)
- Carey Gillam, American investigative journalist and author
- Charles Gillam Sr. (born 1945), American woodcarver and artist
- Charles W. Gillam (1861–1933), American politician from Minnesota
- David Gillam, founder and artistic director of Wales One World Film Festival
- Denys Gillam (1915–1991), British flying ace
- Emily Gillam (born 1977), New Zealand field hockey player
- Geoffrey Gillam (1905–1970), British cardiologist
- Gracie Gillam (born 1992), American actress, singer and dancer
- Isaac T. Gillam (1932–2022), American aerospace engineer
- Jeremy Gillam (born 1976), American politician from Arkansas
- Jess Gillam (born 1988), British saxophonist
- John Pearson Gillam (1917–1986), British archaeologist
- Matty Gillam (born 1997), English footballer
- Peter Gillam (born 1956), English archer
- Ray Gillam (1909–1998), Australian rugby league footballer
- Richard Gillam (born 1967), American entrepreneur
- Robert Gillam (1946–2018), American investor
- Sam Gillam (1867–1938), Welsh football goalkeeper
- Sean Gillam (born 1976), Canadian ice hockey player
- Tink Gillam (1896–1988), American college sports coach
- Tony Gillam (born 1961), British writer and musician
- Victor Gillam (c.1858–1920), American political cartoonist (Judge)
- Zachariah Gillam (1636–1682), New England sea captain

== See also ==
- Gillam, Manitoba, Canada
  - Gillam Airport, Manitoba, Canada
- Gillam Township, Indiana, United States
- Gillams
- Gilliam (surname)
