= Grant E. Hamilton =

American political cartoonist

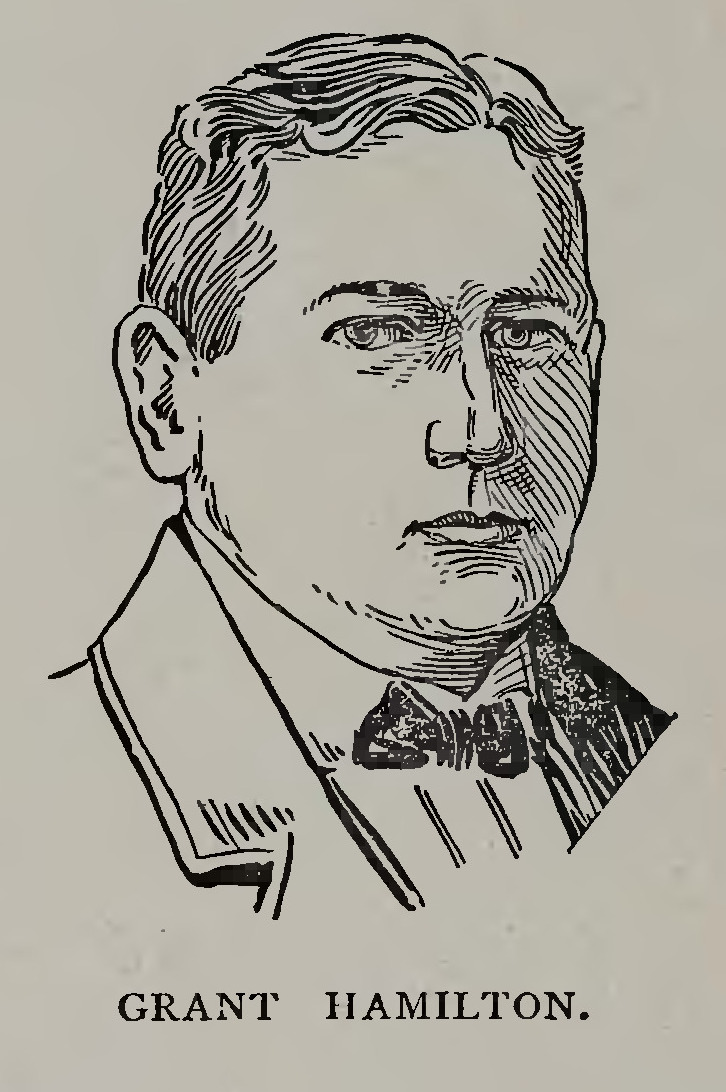
- Drawing of Hamilton in 1904
- Born: August 16, 1862 Youngstown, Ohio, U.S.
- Died: April 17, 1926 (aged 63) Los Angeles, California, U.S.
- Area: Cartoonist

Grant E. Hamilton (16 August 1862 – 17 April 1926) was an American political cartoonist.

== Biography ==
On August 16, 1862, Hamilton was born in Youngstown, Ohio. He was the art editor for the New York-based satirical magazine Judge for over 20 years. Judge, founded in 1881 allied with the Republican Party and supported the candidacy of William McKinley in the 1892 United States presidential election and the 1896 United States presidential election through political cartoons, most of which were drawn by Hamilton and Bernhard Gillam. Hamilton was also an art editor for The Graphic, and Leslie's Weekly. He died in Los Angeles in 1926.
