= James Wales =

James Wales may refer to:

- James Wales (artist) (1747–1795), Scottish painter
- James Albert Wales (1852–1886), caricaturist

== See also ==
- Jimmy Wales (born 1966), co-founder of Wikipedia
- James Whale (1889–1957), British film director
- James Whale (radio presenter) (born 1951), British radio presenter
