= Gilliam (surname) =

Gilliam is an English surname. Notable people with the surname include:

- Armen Gilliam (1964–2011), American basketball player
- Burton Gilliam (born 1938), American actor
- Colt Gilliam (born 1989), American racing driver
- Cornelius Gilliam (1798–1848), American pioneer, politician, and army commander
- Frank Gilliam (disambiguation), multiple people
- Garry Gilliam (born 1990), American football player
- Herm Gilliam (1946–2005), American basketball player
- Jackson Earle Gilliam (1920–2000), American bishop
- James Frank Gilliam (1915–1990), American historian
- Jim Gilliam (1928–1978), American baseball player
- John Gilliam (born 1945), American football player
- Joe Gilliam (1950–2000), American football player
- Holly Michelle Gilliam (born 1944), birth name of American singer and actress Michelle Phillips
- Makayla Gilliam-Price, American social activist
- Reggie Gilliam (born 1997), American football player
- Robert B. Gilliam (1805–1870), American politician and judge
- Sam Gilliam (1933–2022), American artist
- Seth Gilliam (born 1968), American actor
- Stu Gilliam (1933–2013), American actor and comedian
- Terry Gilliam (born 1940), American-born British film director
- Tyrone Delano Gilliam Jr. (1966–1998), American murderer
- William Gilliam (1841–1893), American politician
