= Judge (magazine) =

Defunct American weekly satirical magazine

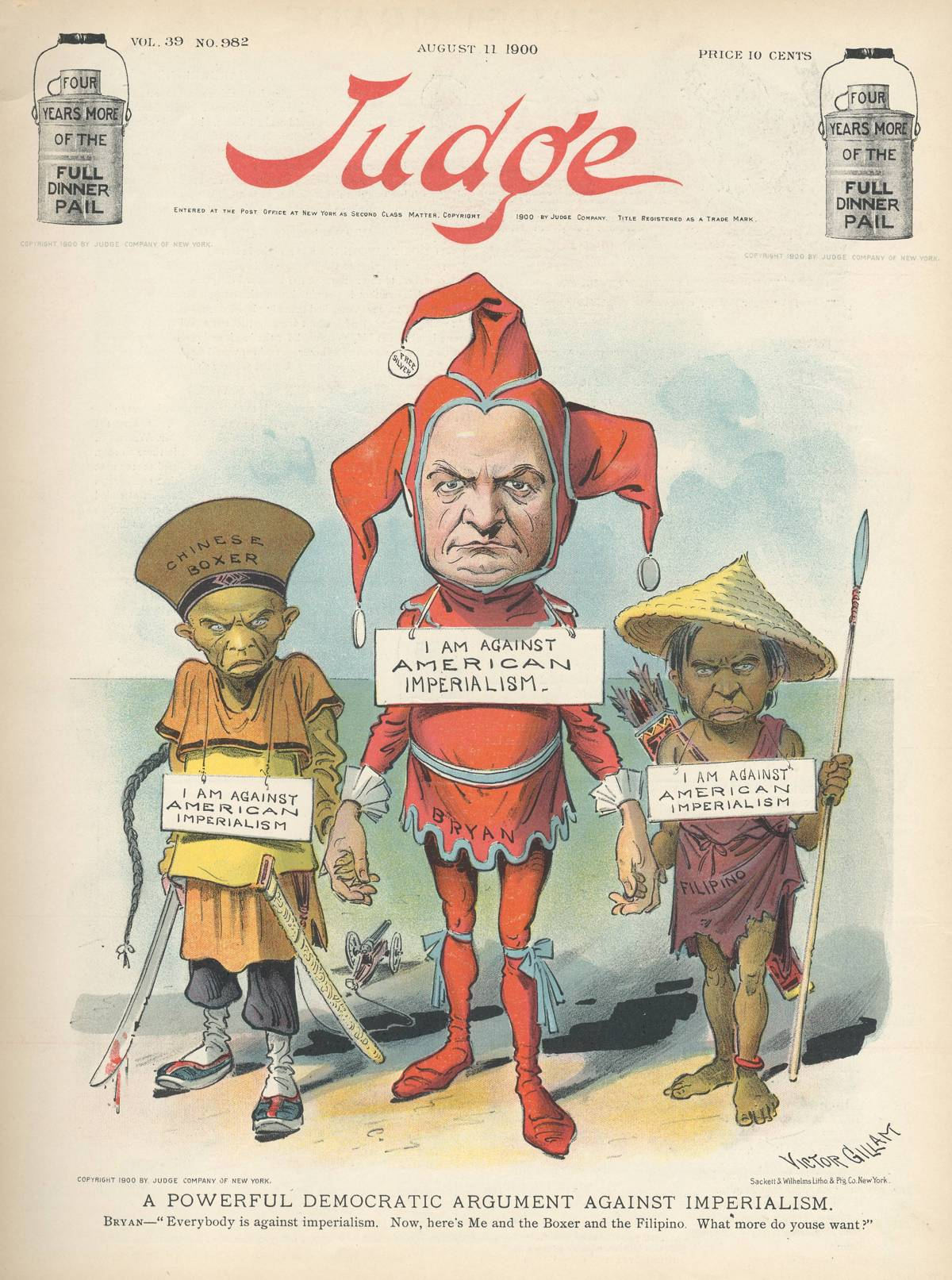
- Front page for August 11, 1900. Illustrated by Victor Gillam.
- Categories: Satirical magazine
- Frequency: Weekly
- First issue: October 29, 1881; 145 years ago
- Final issue: 1953; 73 years ago
- Country: US
- Based in: New York City
- OCLC: 560348751

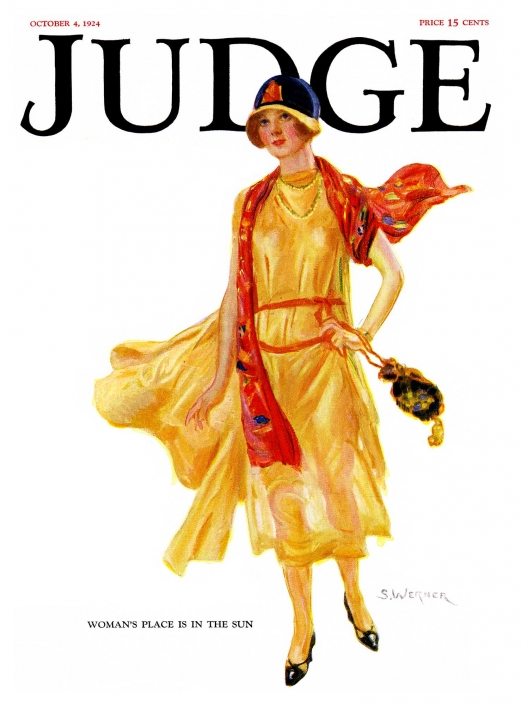
Cover of October 4, 1924, issue

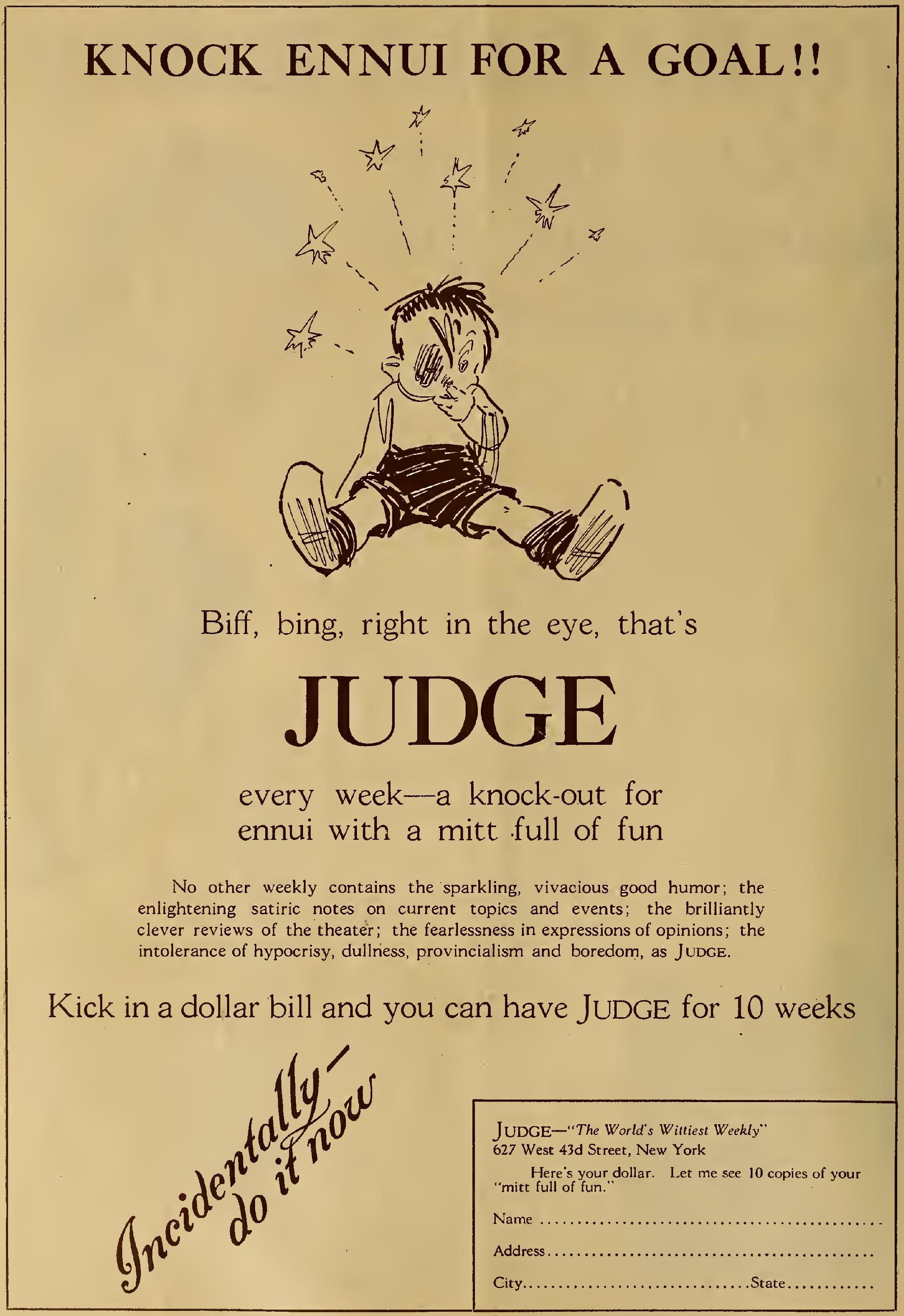
Judge ad in 1926

Judge was a weekly satirical magazine published in the United States from 1881 to 1947. It was launched by artists who had left the rival Puck; the founders included cartoonist James Albert Wales, dime novels publisher Frank Tousey and author George H. Jessop.

== History and profile ==
The first printing of Judge was on October 29, 1881, during the Long Depression. It was 16 pages long and printed on quarto paper. While it did well initially, it soon had trouble competing with Puck. William J. Arkell purchased the magazine in the middle 1880s. Arkell used his considerable wealth to persuade the cartoonists Eugene Zimmerman ("Zim") and Bernhard Gillam to leave Puck. A supporter of the Republican Party, Arkell persuaded his cartoonists to attack the Democratic administration of Grover Cleveland. With GOP aid, Judge boomed during the 1880s and 1890s, surpassing its rival publication in content and circulation. By the early 1890s, the circulation of the magazine reached 50,000.

Under the editorial leadership of Isaac Gregory (1886–1901), Judge further allied with the Republican Party and supported the candidacy of William McKinley largely through the cartoons of cartoonists Victor Gillam and Grant E. Hamilton. Circulation for Judge was about 85,000 in the 1890s. By the 1900s, the magazine had become successful, reaching a circulation of 100,000 by 1912. Edward Anthony was an editor in the early 1920s. Anthony was later co-author of Frank Buck's first two books, Bring 'em Back Alive and Wild Cargo.

Harold Ross was an editor of Judge between April 5 and August 2, 1924. He used the experience on the magazine to start his own in 1925, The New Yorker.

The success of The New Yorker, as well as the Great Depression, put pressure on Judge. It became a monthly in 1932 and ceased circulation in 1947. Previously, in 1921, the parent company of the magazine had been put into receivership, and Frank Leslie's Illustrated Newspaper was merged into it in 1922.

Judge was resurrected in October 1953 as a 32-page weekly. David N. Laux was President and Publisher with Mabel Search as editorial director and Al Catalano as art director. Contributors included Arthur L. Lippman and Victor Lasky. There were sections with light essays on sport, golf, horse racing, radio, theater, television, bridge and current books, along with submissions from college magazines, a crossword puzzle, single-panel cartoons and humorous pieces. There were several political sections; one-liners, cartoons and longer essays with mostly a conservative bent, in a style foreshadowing Emmett Tyrrell of today's The American Spectator. The resurrected version most likely folded after issuing the November 1953 issue.

A collection of Judge and Puck cartoons dating from 1887–1900 is maintained by the Special Collections Reference Center of The George Washington University. The collection is located in GW's Estelle and Melvin Gelman Library and is open to researchers.

American painter and illustrator Norman Rockwell had his first Judge cover on July 7, 1917, with Excuse Me! (Soldier Escorting Woman). The painting, initially sold at a World War I Liberty bond auction, later sold for $543,000 at a May 7, 2021, fine art auction. The sale price is an auction record for any Rockwell Judge magazine cover.

== Gallery ==
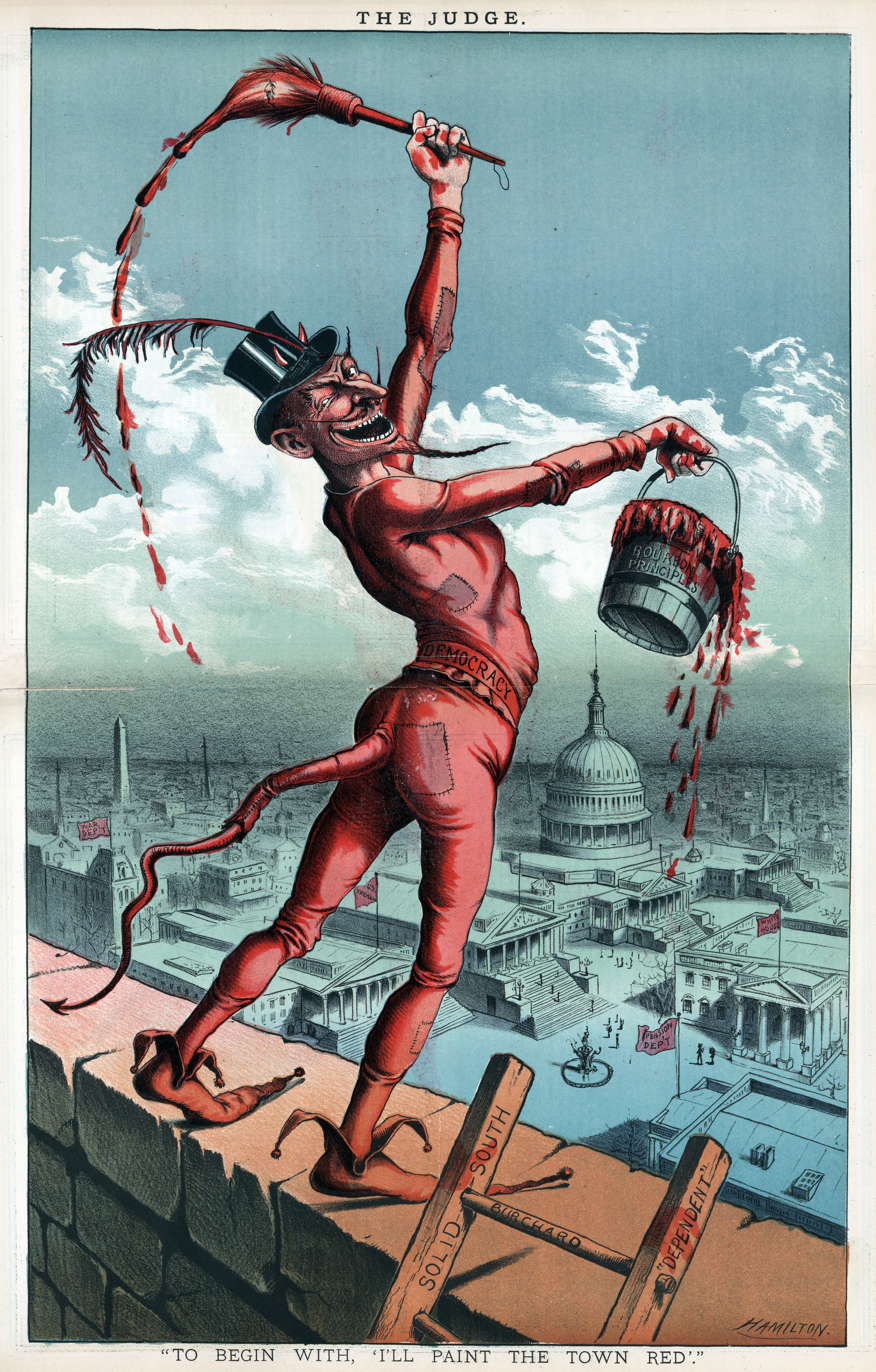
"To begin with, 'I'll paint the town red", by Grant E. Hamilton, The Judge vol. 7, 31 January 1885.

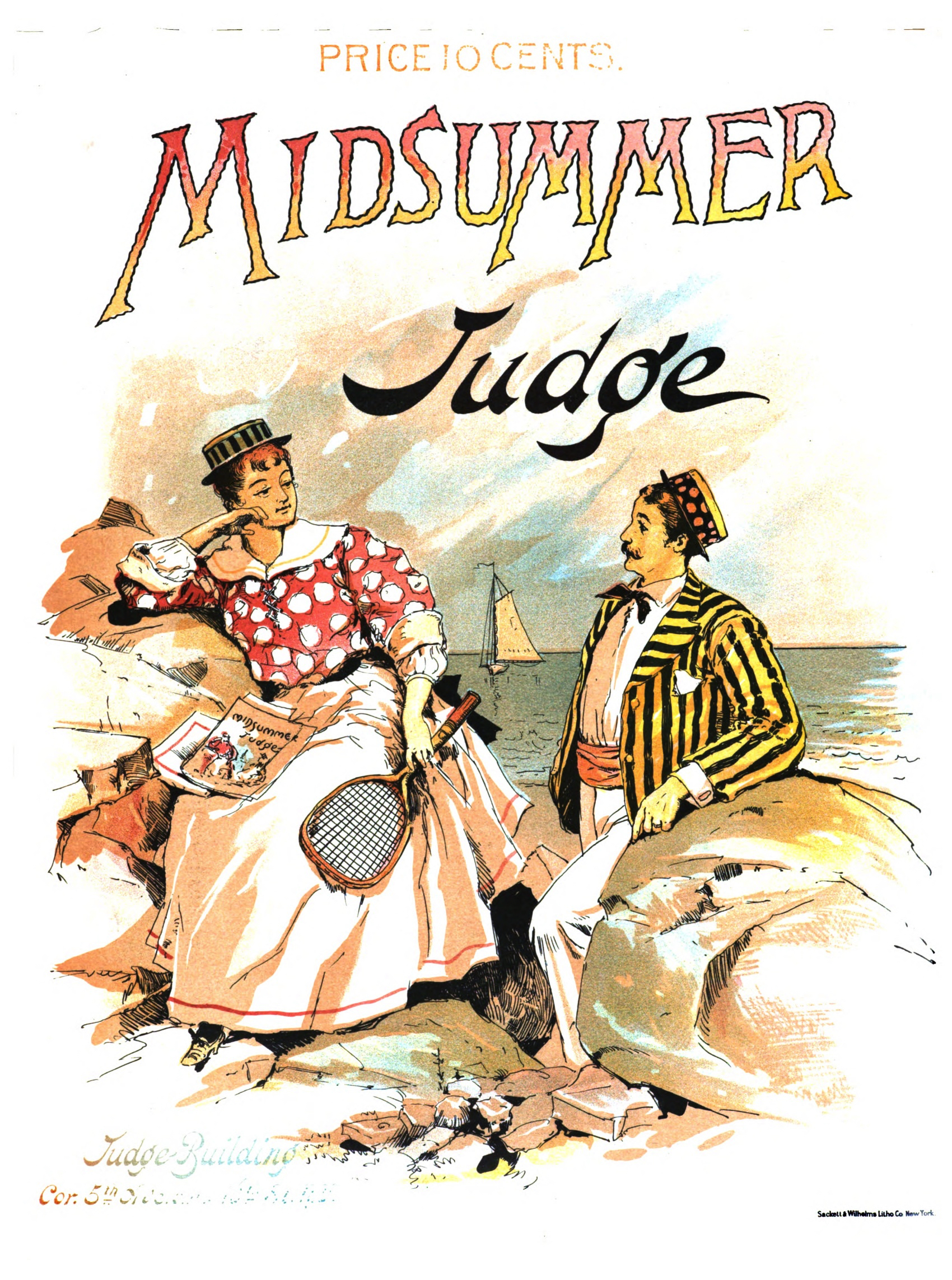
Midsummer number, 2 Aug 1890

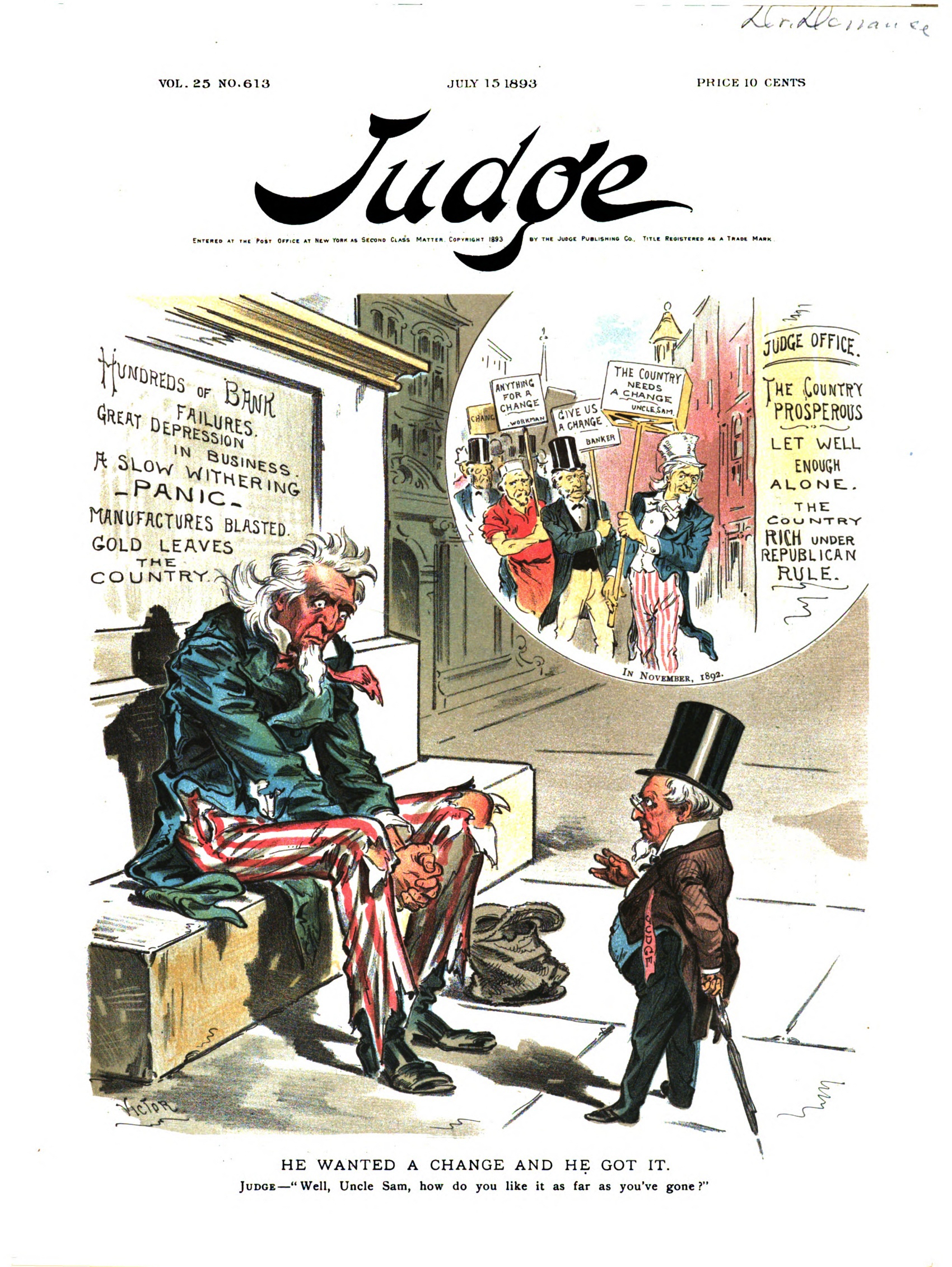
Personification of Judge magazine on the cover of the 15 Jul 1893 issue. Illustrated by Victor Gillam.

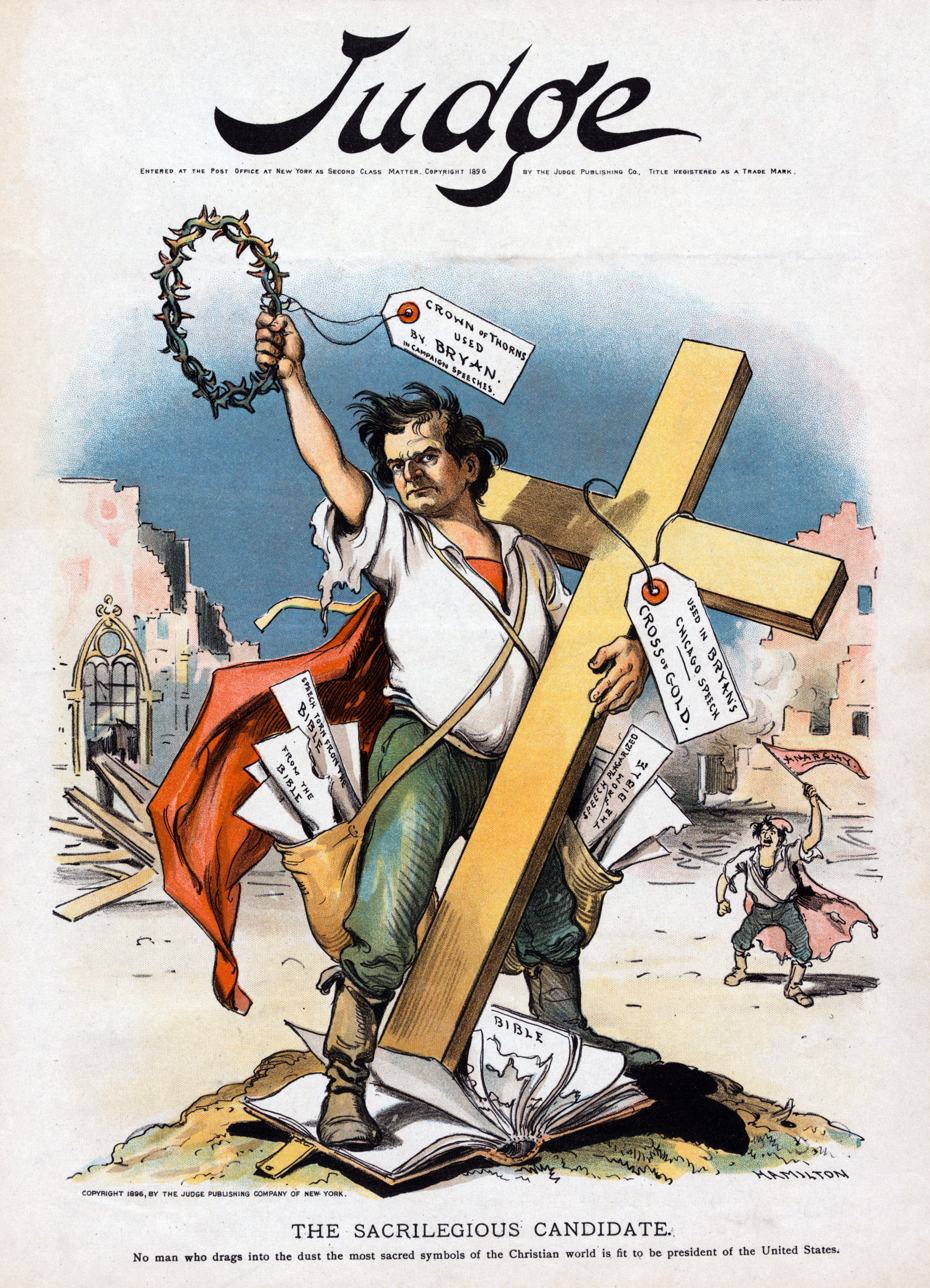
An 1896 cartoon by Grant E. Hamilton, on William Jennings Bryan's "Cross of Gold" speech

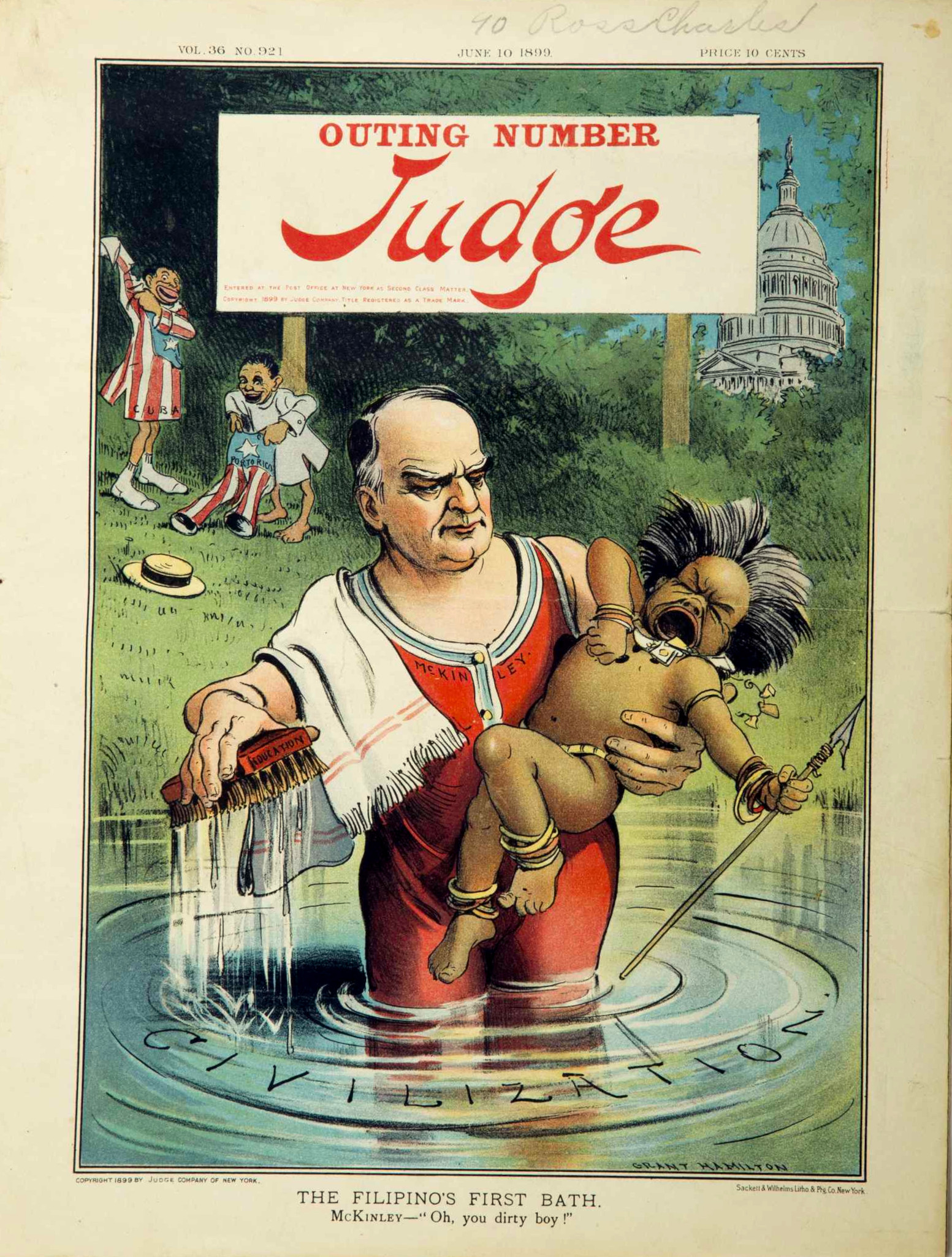
An 1899 cover of Judge magazine showing a cartoon by Grant E. Hamilton of U.S. President William McKinley

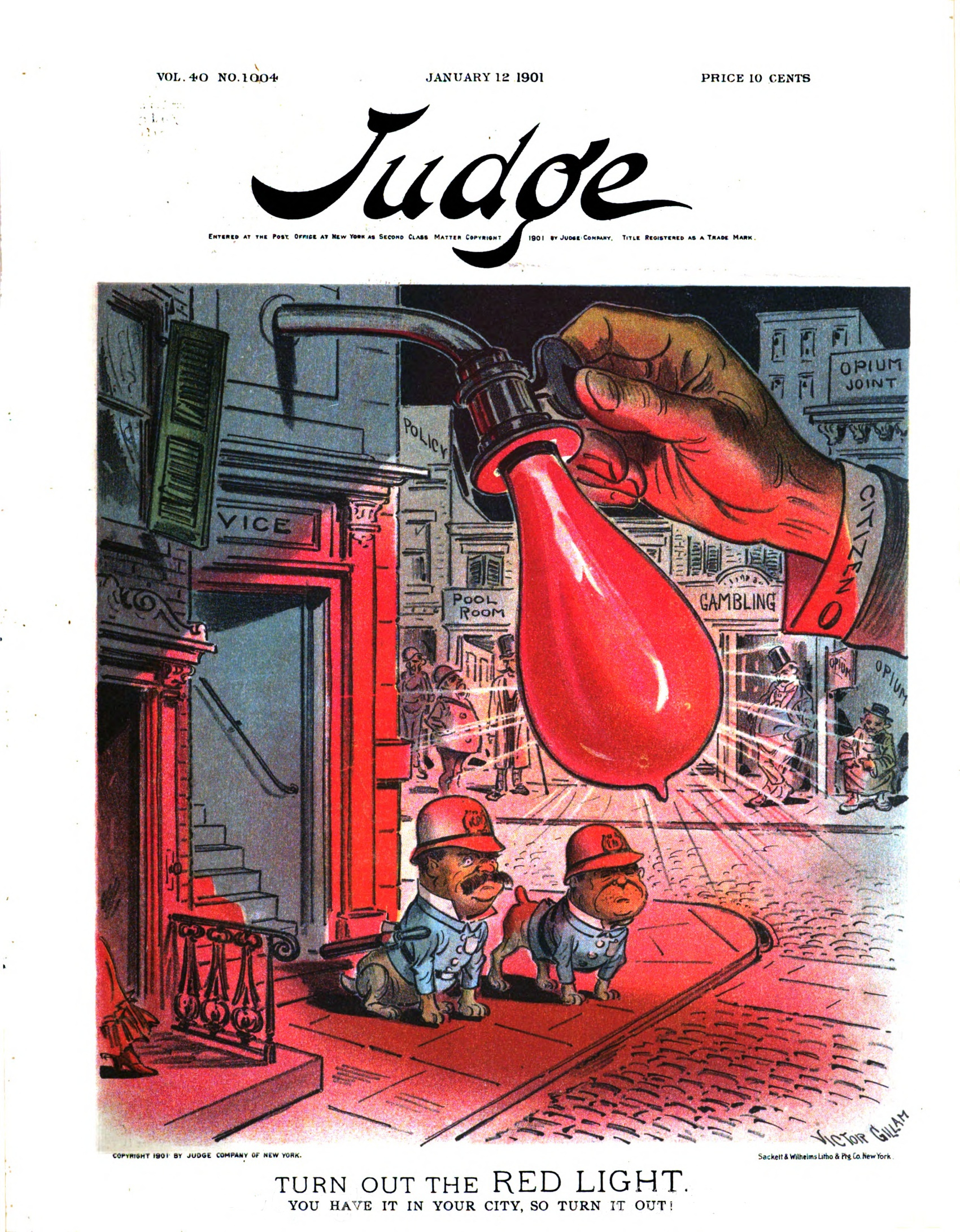
Cover by Victor Gillam expressing opposition to red-light districts, 12 Jan 1901

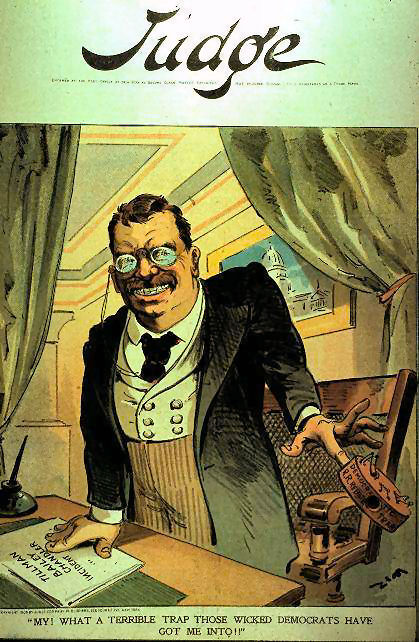
A 1906 cover of Judge magazine showing a cartoon of Theodore Roosevelt by Eugene Zimmerman

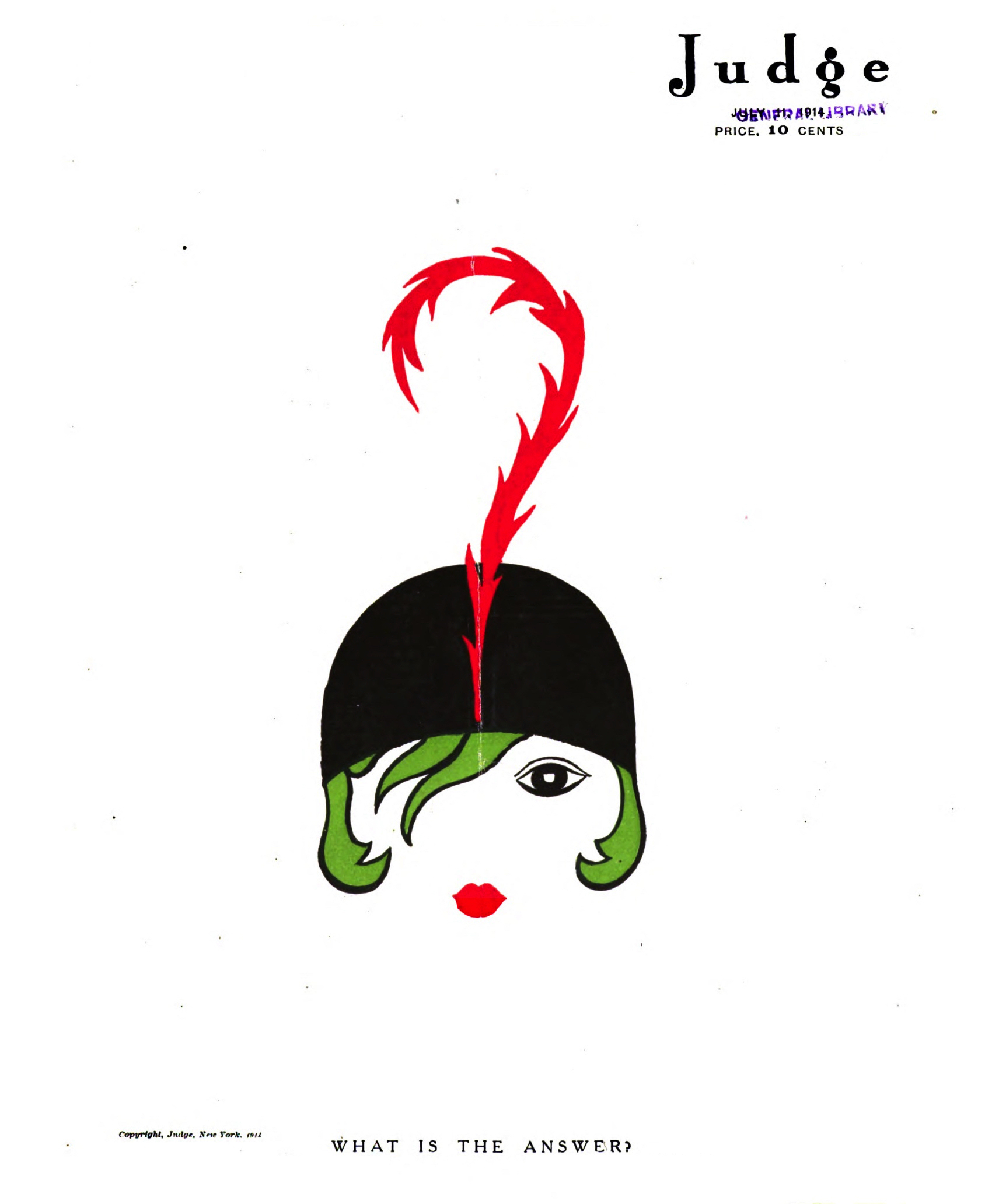
1914 cover - "What is the answer?"

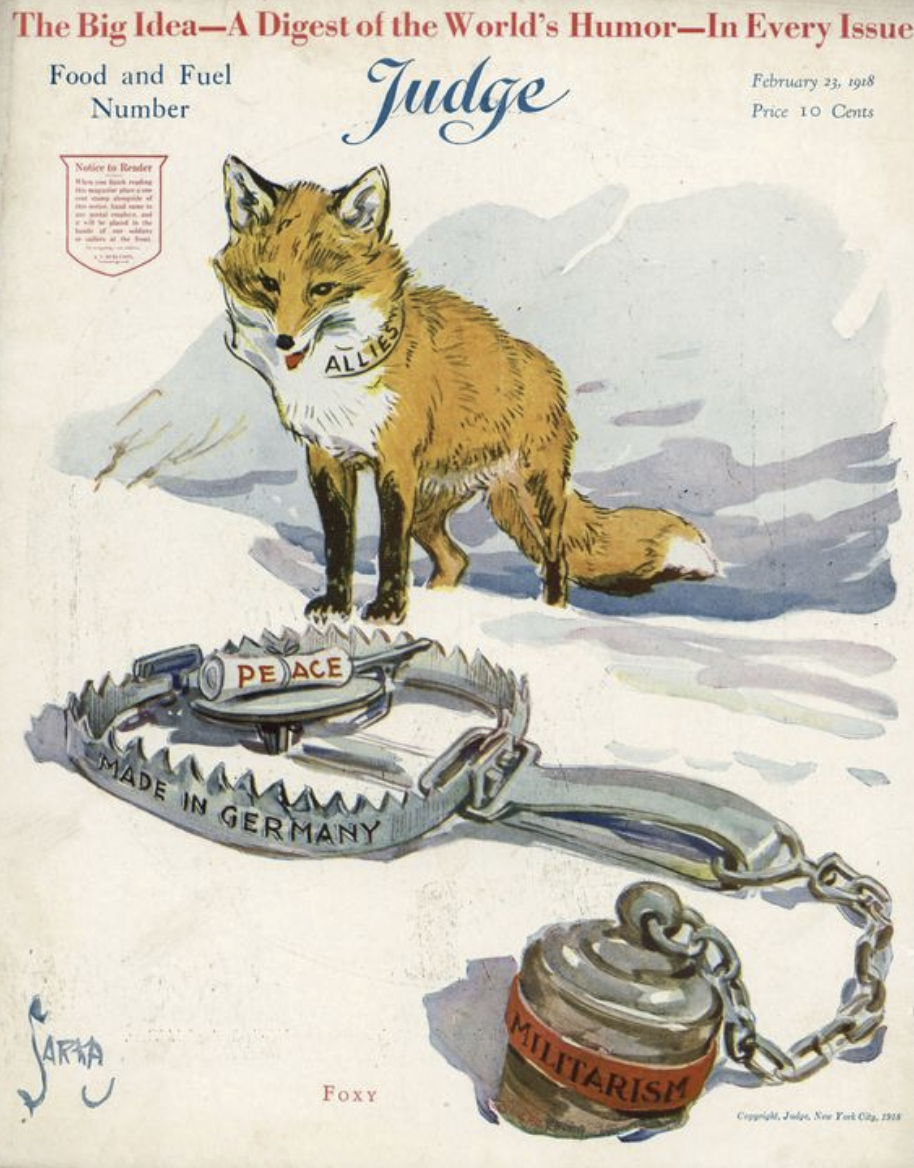
1918 cover featuring a political cartoon by Charles Sarka about World War I

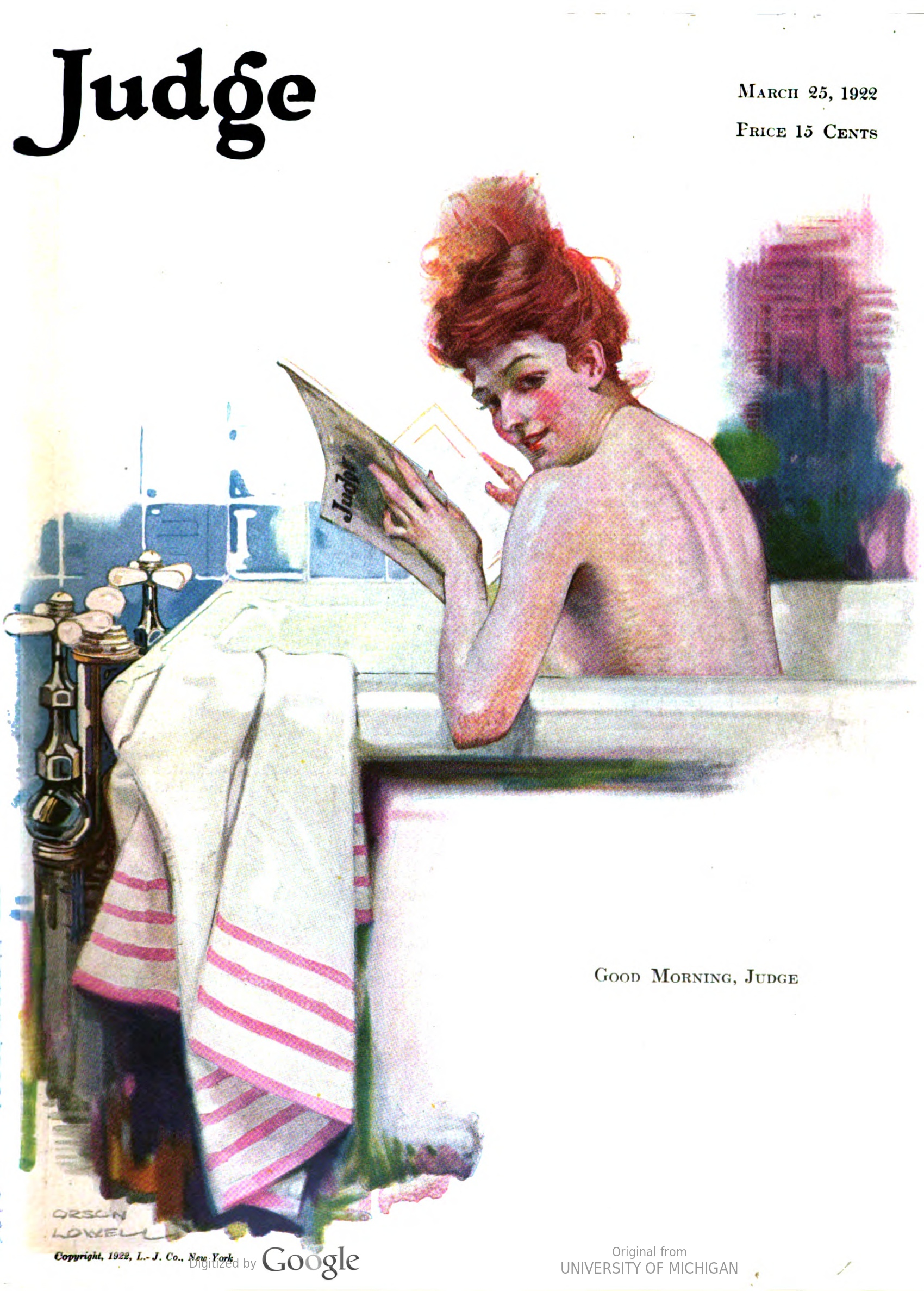
1922 cover by Orson Lowell - "Good Morning, Judge"

"The Cake Eater Gets the Frosting." Cover depicting a flapper dancing the Charleston with a skeleton, representing the dangers of reckless behavior. September 13, 1924, Vol. 87, no. 2237.

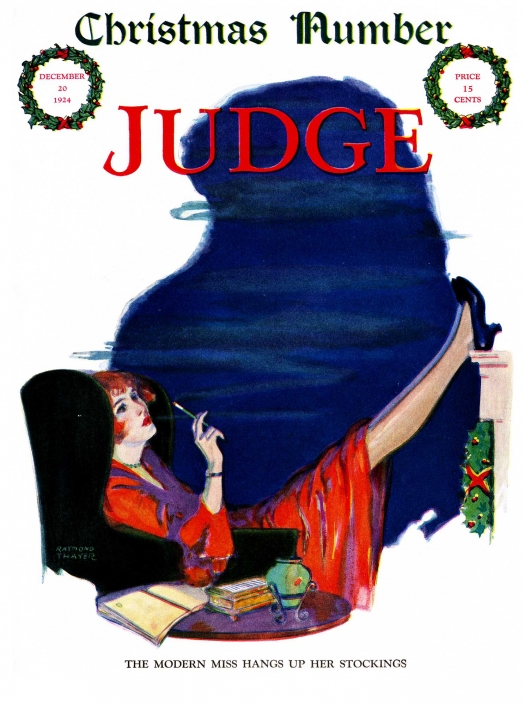
Christmas number, 20 Dec 1924

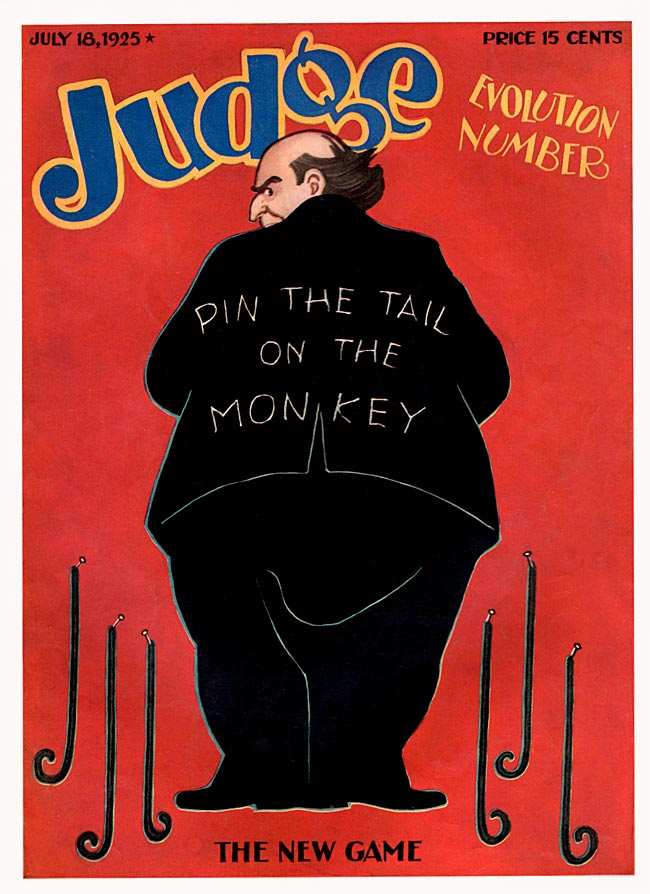
1925 "Evolution Number" covering the Scopes Trial; the cover depicts William Jennings Bryan

First Reborn Judge, October 26, 1953, cover by David Wasserman
