= Victor Gillam =

American cartoonist (c. 1858 – 1920)

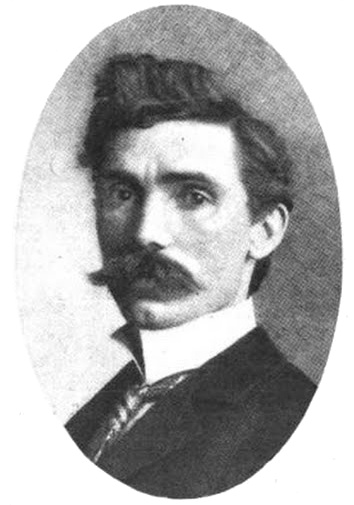
- Born: c. 1858; Yorkshire, England
- Died: January 29, 1920; Brooklyn, New York, US

Frederick Victor Gillam (c. 1858 – January 29, 1920) was an American political cartoonist, known for his work in Judge magazine for twenty years, as well as the St. Louis Dispatch, Denver Times, New York World, and New York Globe. He was a member of the New York Press Club and Lotos Club. Born in Yorkshire, England, he emigrated to the United States at age six.

His notable work included support of William McKinley's 1896 presidential campaign. The younger brother of famed cartoonist Bernhard Gillam (1856–1896), he signed his work "Victor" or "F. Victor" until his brother's death. Victor died (aged 61-62) at Kings County Hospital and was buried in Evergreens Cemetery, Brooklyn.

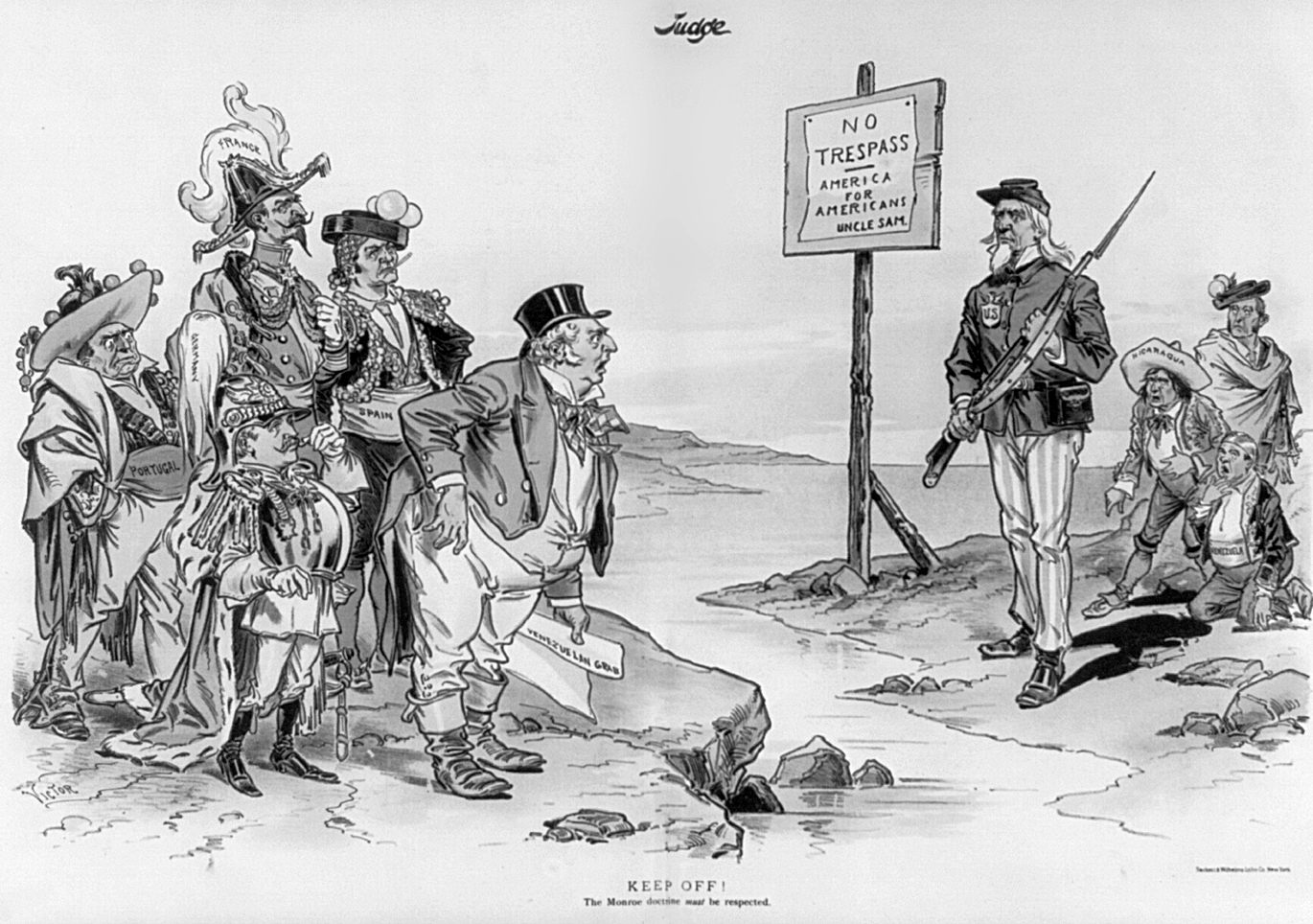
"Keep off! The Monroe Doctrine must be respected " (1896)

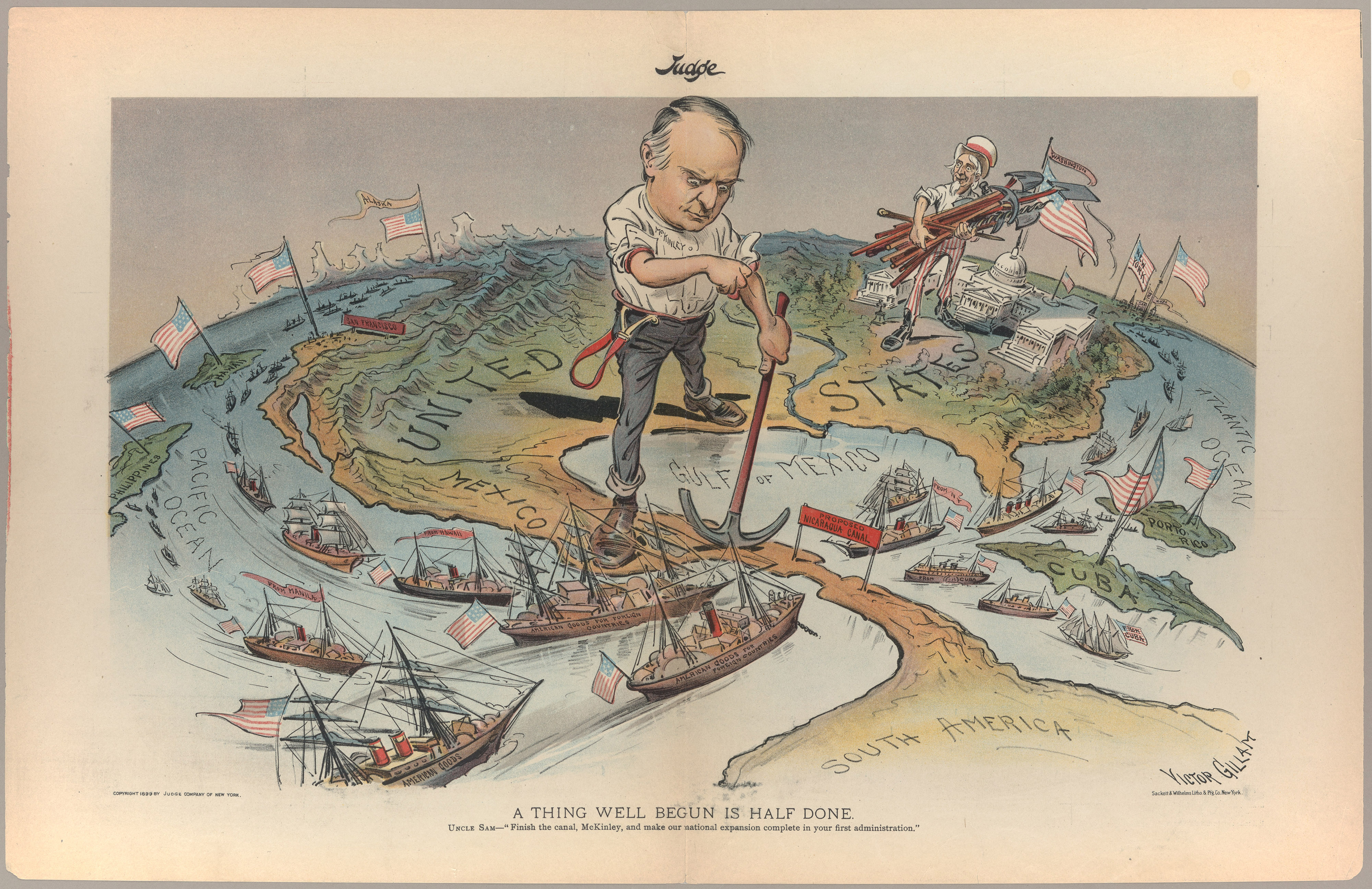
"A Thing Well Begun Is Half Done" (1899)

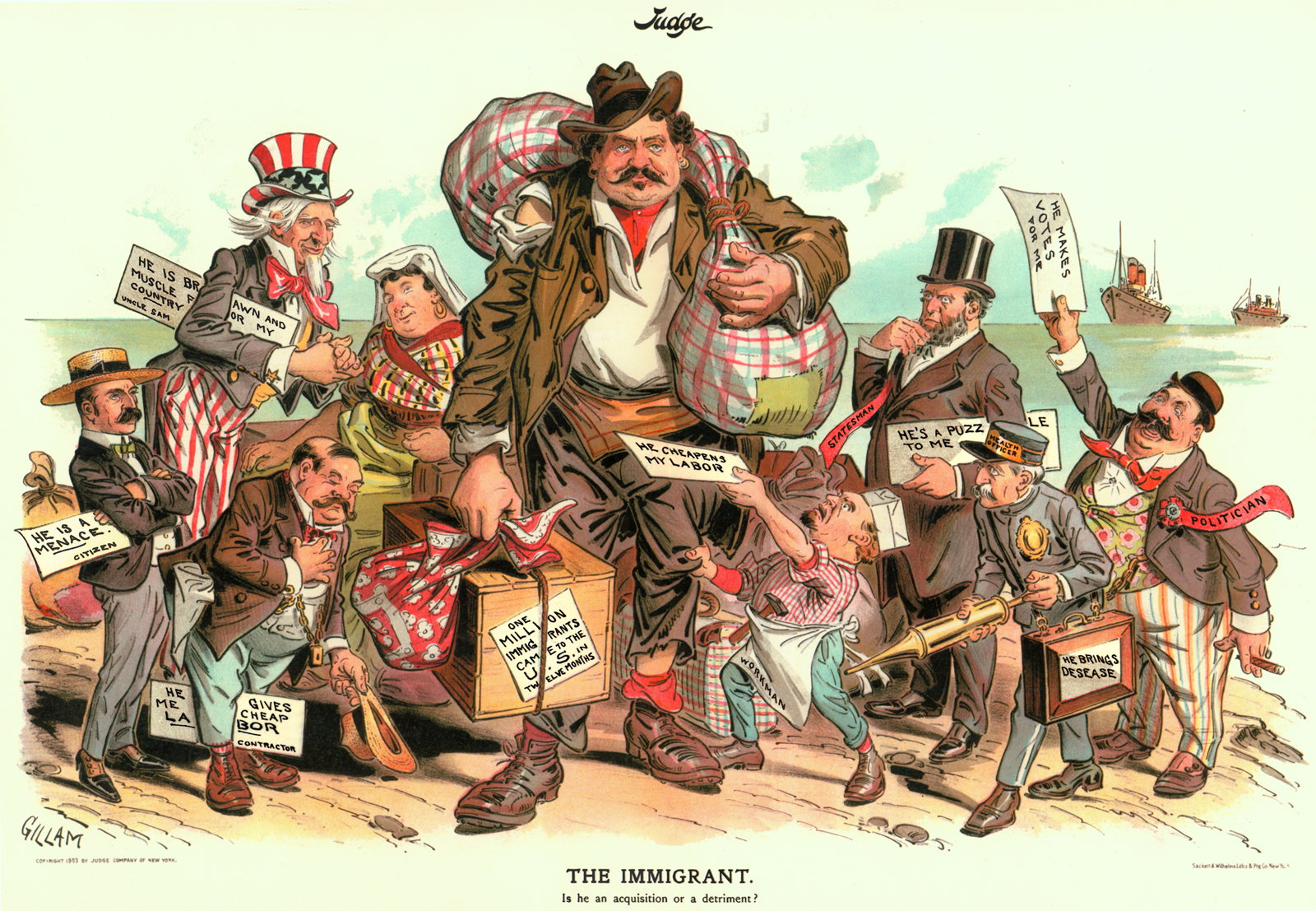
"The Immigrant. Is He an Acquisition or a Detriment?"(1903)
