= Gillams =

Gillams may refer to:

- Angus Gillams (born 1995), English squash player
- Gillams, Newfoundland and Labrador, Canada
- Gillam's bell or Gillham's bell, scientific name Darwinia oxylepis, plant in the myrtle family Myrtaceae

== See also ==
- Gillam (disambiguation)
