= Direct Sports Network =

Digital media company based in Irvine, California

- Type: Private
- Industry: Entertainment
- Founded: Irvine, California
- Founder: Richard Gillam
- Headquarters: Irvine, California
- Key people: Richard Gillam (CEO)
- Products: Streaming Media; Video on Demand
- Services: Digital Distribution; Video Production
- Website: www.asvott.com

Direct Sports Network or DSN (formerly DeskSite) is a digital media company based in Irvine, California. The company distributes sports programming with a focus on team-produced content. The network consists of individual team-specific apps (referred to as ‘DeskSites’), as well as a general 'Sports' app with individual teams aggregated together, in a Netflix-like ecosystem.

== Business ==
DSN operates an Ad-supported Video on Demand system (AVOD) through a network of branded sports apps on many platforms. TV commercials from national advertisers are periodically inserted into premium sports content. The various apps (DeskSites) are both free to install and access.

== Programming ==
DSN programming primarily consists of platform-exclusive content supplied by individual sports teams, complemented with original programming segments produced inhouse in cooperation with various content partners.

=== Content Partners ===
==== Major League Soccer ====
Colorado Rapids, Houston Dynamo, Los Angeles Galaxy, and Seattle Sounders FC.

==== NASCAR ====
Leaguewide NASCAR,

==== National Football League ====
Denver Broncos, Baltimore Ravens, Buffalo Bills, Chicago Bears, Cleveland Browns, Dallas Cowboys, Indianapolis Colts, Los Angeles Rams, Miami Dolphins, New England Patriots, Oakland Raiders, Pittsburgh Steelers, and San Francisco 49ers. New York Jets, Detroit Lions, Cincinnati Bengals, Jacksonville Jaguars, New York Jets, New Orleans Saints, Houston Texans,

==== National Hockey League ====
Boston Bruins, Buffalo Sabres, Colorado Avalanche, Columbus Blue Jackets, Dallas Stars, Detroit Red Wings, New Jersey Devils, Philadelphia Flyers, Pittsburgh Penguins, San Jose Sharks, Washington Capitals, New York Islanders.

== Platforms ==
Available on Amazon’s Fire TV, Roku, Apple TV, select Smart TVs, iPads, as well as Windows & Mac desktops, laptops, and tablets.

== Corporate Affairs ==
=== Directors ===
Peter Farrelly, Sid Ganis, Mark Handler, Erwin Raphael, and Leigh Steinberg.

=== Management ===
Richard Gillam, CEO.

=== Offices ===
Irvine, California.
