= Frank Gilliam =

Frank Gilliam may refer to:

- Frank Gilliam (American football)
- Frank Gilliam (politician)
