= Barbara Gillam =

Australian psychologist and vision researcher

Barbara Jean Gillam FRSN FASSA is an Australian psychologist. She is Emeritus and Scientia Professor at the University of New South Wales.

Gillam received a PhD from the Australian National University in 1964 for her thesis "Space perception with aniseikonic lenses: A study of stereoscopic vision".

Her work has been in the area of perception and vision.

== Awards and honours ==
Gillam was awarded a Guggenheim Fellowship in 1985.

She was elected a Fellow of the Academy of the Social Sciences in Australia in 1994 and in 2017 became a Fellow of the Royal Society of New South Wales.
