= Richard Gillam =

- Born: Richard James Gillam; March 24, 1967 (age 59); Atlanta, Georgia, United States
- Occupation: CEO

Richard James Gillam (born March 24, 1967) is an American entrepreneur, former U.S. Marine, and was formerly ranked as one of the top 10 pairs figure skaters in America.

== Business ==
He is the founder and CEO of Direct Sports Network (formerly DeskSite), a privately held digital media company headquartered in Orange County. Prior to launching Direct Sports Network, he was a nationally recognized day trader, and a frequent guest on national television broadcasts. Gillam has close ties with the sports and entertainment industry, counting several industry icons as both friends and business partners.

== Direct Sports Network ==
Direct Sports Network or DSN (formerly DeskSite) is a digital media company based in Irvine, California. The company partners with various North American sports leagues and teams to distribute team produced content. The network consists of individual team apps (referred to as 'DeskSites'), as well as a general 'Sports Network' app with the individual teams aggregated together, in a Netflix-like ecosystem.

== Awards ==
In 2001, Gillam was America's first recipient of U.S. Figure Skating's Outstanding Sportsmanship Award, recognizing an individual or individuals who have shown an example of unparalleled sportsmanship.
