= James Albert Wales =

American antisemite and caricaturist

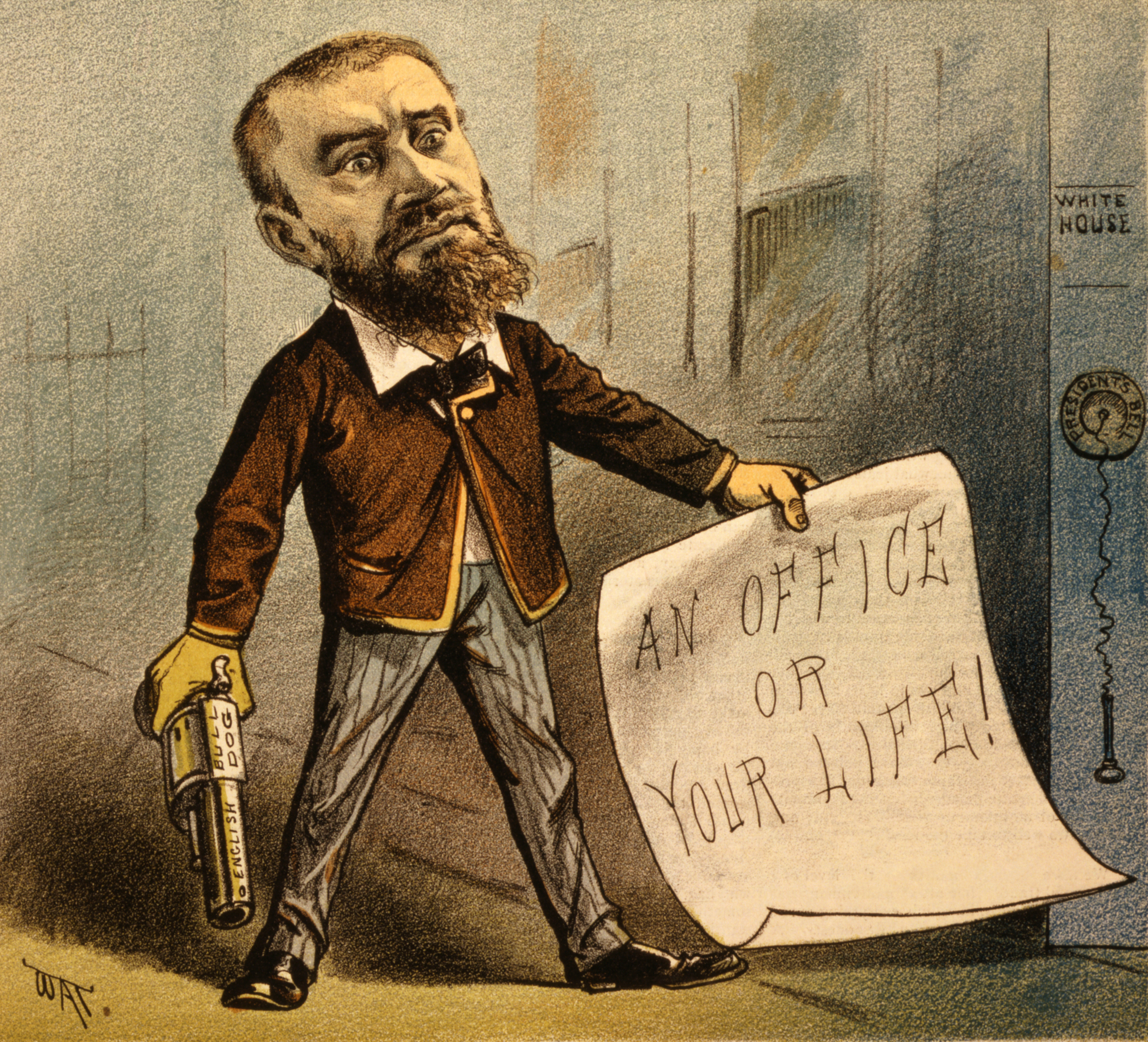
Political cartoon created for the cover of Puck Magazine on July 13, 1881. The cartoon shows Charles J. Guiteau with a gun, and a note that reads "AN OFFICE OR YOUR LIFE!". The caption reads: "A Model Office Seeker". It is accompanied by a quote: "I am a lawyer, a theologian, and a politician" - Charles J. Guiteau. Guiteau believed himself to be largely responsible for Garfield's election as president, and demanded an ambassadorship in return.

James Albert Wales (August 30, 1852 in Clyde, Ohio – December 6, 1886 in New York City) was an American caricaturist. After leaving school, he apprenticed himself to a wood engraver in Toledo, but soon afterward went to Cincinnati, and thence to Cleveland, where he drew cartoons for the Leader during the presidential canvass of 1872. After working for some time in Chicago and Cleveland, he went to New York in 1873, and two years later secured an engagement on an illustrated newspaper. Afterward he was employed on Puck, in which some of his best works appeared. In 1881 he went abroad, and after his return he became one of the founders of Judge, and was for some time its chief cartoonist.

He specialized in antisemitic attacks ridiculing Jews. In 1882 he wrote about Jews in Judge:

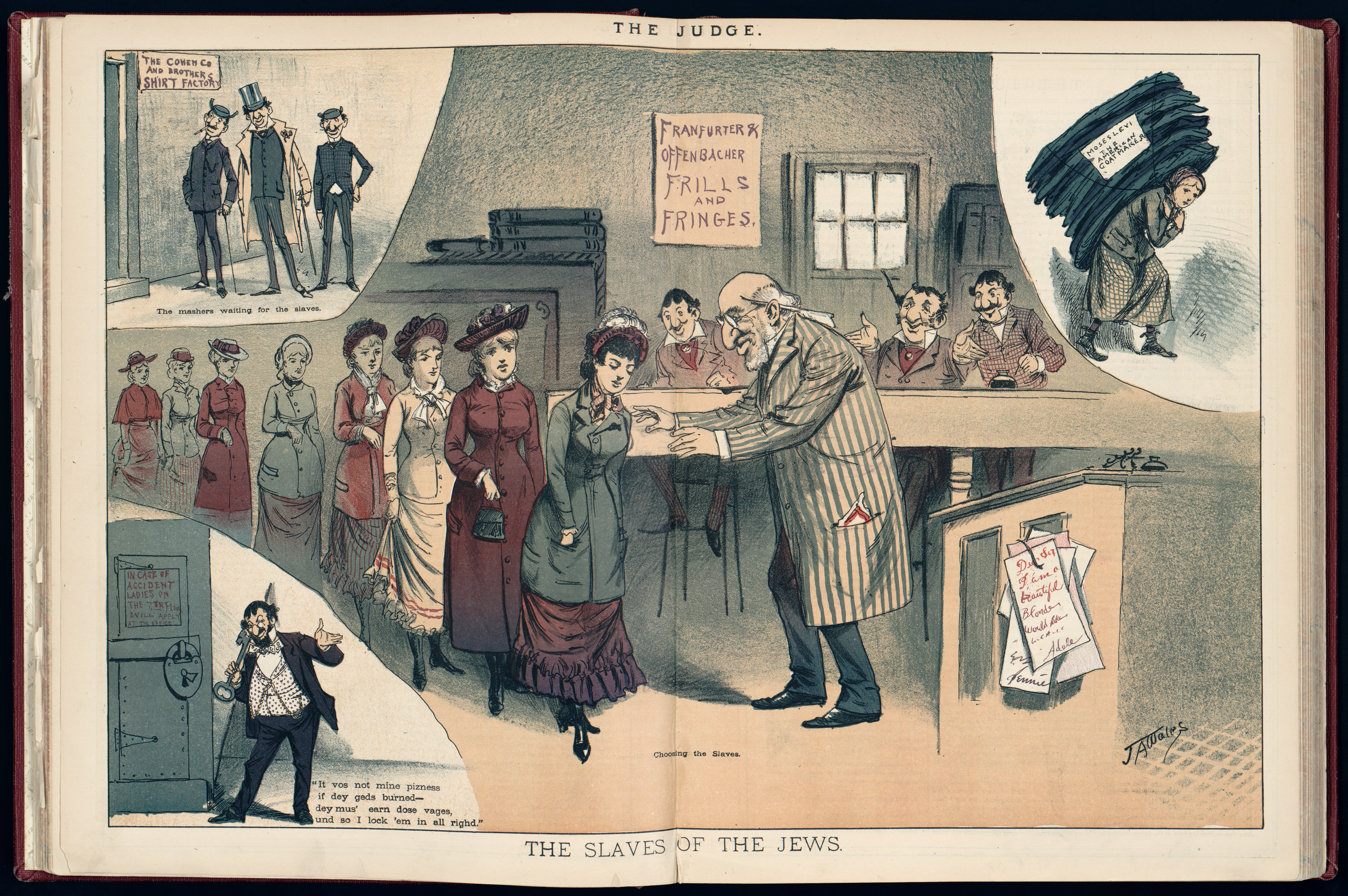
The slaves of the Jews, 1882

They and their money already rule Europe, and it is only a question of time when they will do the same in our own country, and the world at large.

He returned to Puck in 1885, and continued his attacks on Jews. Wales was the only prominent caricaturist of the newer school who was born in America. He was clever at portraiture, and produced some excellent cartoons, according to contemporary scholarship.
