= William Gilliam =

Member of the Virginia House of Delegates

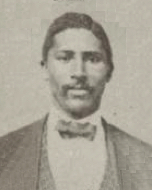
- Official portrait, 1872

Member of the Virginia House of Delegates from Prince George County
- In office December 6, 1871 – December 1, 1875
- Preceded by: A. N. Fretz
- Succeeded by: Mann Page

Personal details
- Born: c. 1841 Prince George County, Virginia, U.S.
- Died: January 23, 1893 (aged 51–52) New York City, U.S.
- Resting place: St. Michael's Cemetery
- Party: Republican
- Spouse: Susan
- Occupation: Farmer; politician

William Gilliam (c. 1841 – January 23, 1893) was an American Republican politician who served as a member of the Virginia House of Delegates, representing Prince George County from 1871 to 1875. He was one of the first African-Americans to serve in Virginia's government.

== See also ==
- African American officeholders from the end of the Civil War until before 1900

Virginia House of Delegates
| Preceded by A. N. Fretz | Virginia Delegate for Prince George County; 1871–1875 | Succeeded by Mann Page |
