= Bernhard Gillam =

English-American cartoonist (1856–1896)

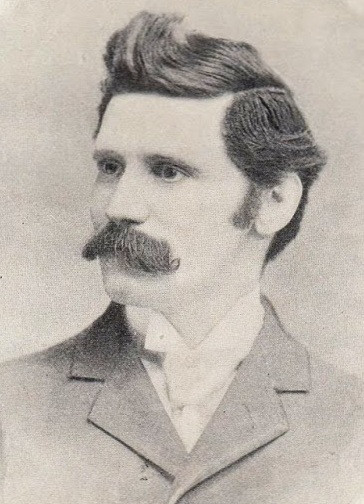
- Born: April 28, 1856; Banbury, United Kingdom
- Died: January 19, 1896 (aged 39); Canajoharie, New York
- Known for: Cartooning

Bernhard Gillam (April 28, 1856 – January 19, 1896) was an English-born American political cartoonist.

Gillam was born in Banbury, Oxfordshire. He arrived in New York with his parents in 1866. He worked as a copyist in a lawyer's office, but switched to the study of engraving, and later, after some of his cartoons had appeared in the New York Graphic, turned to cartooning. His work appeared in Frank Leslie's Illustrated Newspaper, Harper's Weekly, where he worked with Thomas Nast during James A. Garfield's campaign of 1880, and Puck magazine where he came under the influence of Joseph Keppler. Gillam also produced work for Judge, a magazine of which he became director-in-chief in 1886.

Gillam's cartoons on James G. Blaine during the 1884 US presidential campaign played a large part in Grover Cleveland's election to office. "Phryne before the Chicago Tribunal", also known as "The Tattooed Man", which appeared in the Puck issue of June 4, 1884, showed Blaine's body covered in tattoos detailing corruption charges from his political past. Blaine threatened legal action, but backed down on the advice of his political friends. According to Blaine biographer David Saville Muzzey, "it is doubtful if any cartoon in our history ever had the vogue and influence of Gillam's Tattooed Man." Oddly, Gillam was a Republican who voted for Blaine in 1884.

During the presidential campaigns of 1888 and 1892, Gillam's cartoons depicted the dangers of the free-trade policy of the Democrats and the benefits of Republican protectionism.

Bernhard Gillam died in Canajoharie, New York, of typhoid fever in 1896.

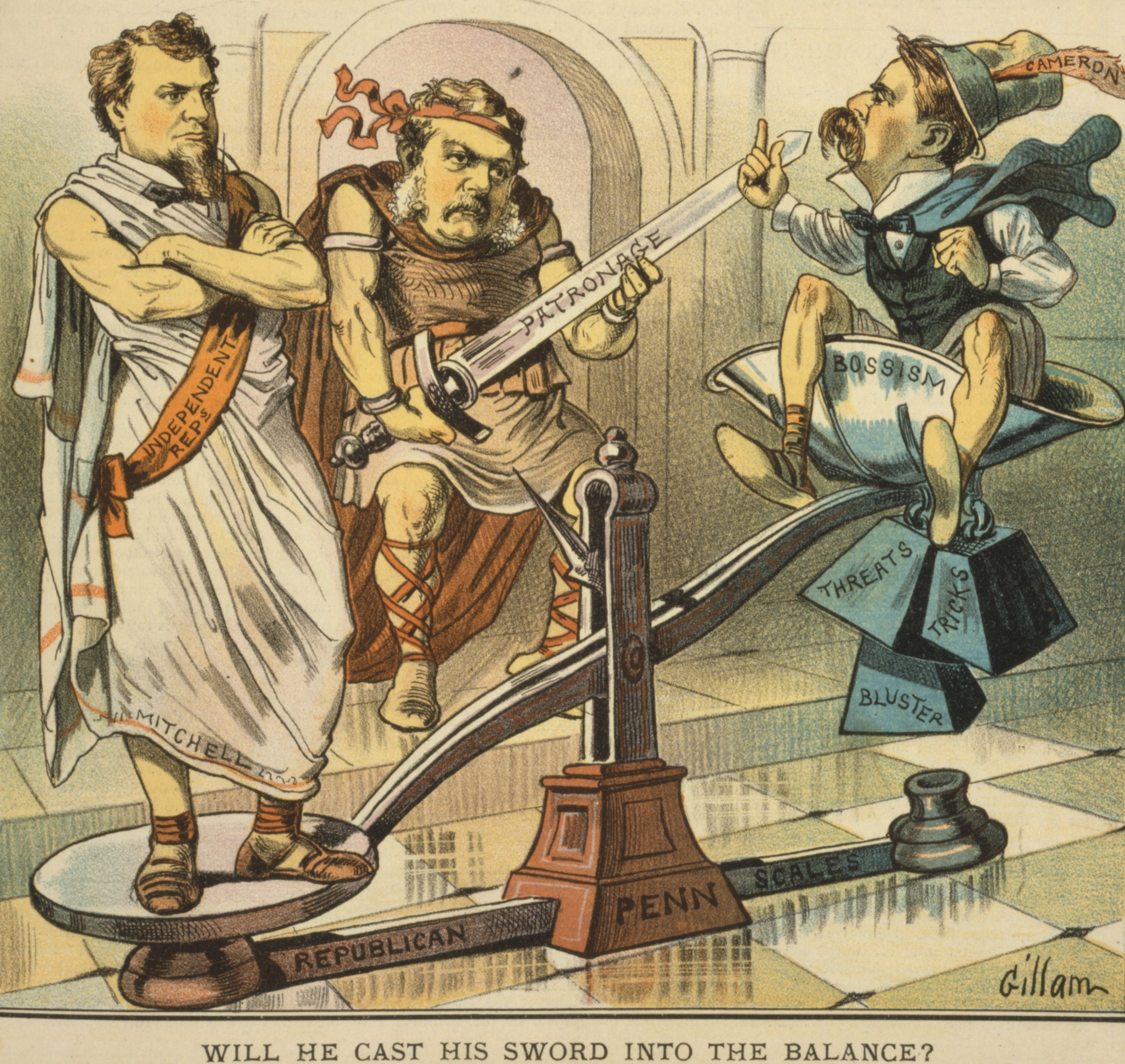
"Will he cast his sword into the balance?" (1882)

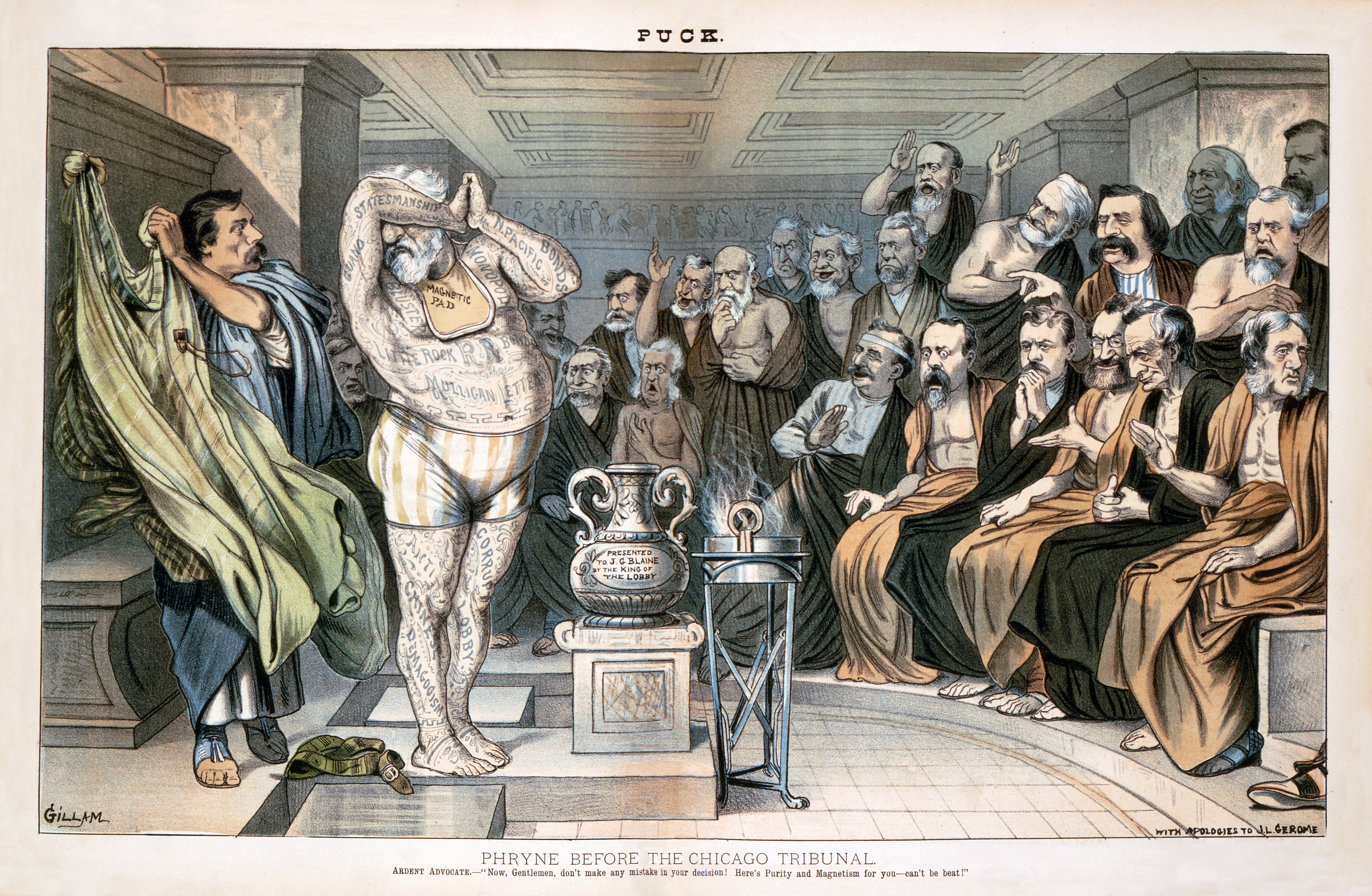
"Phryne before the Chicago Tribunal" (1884)

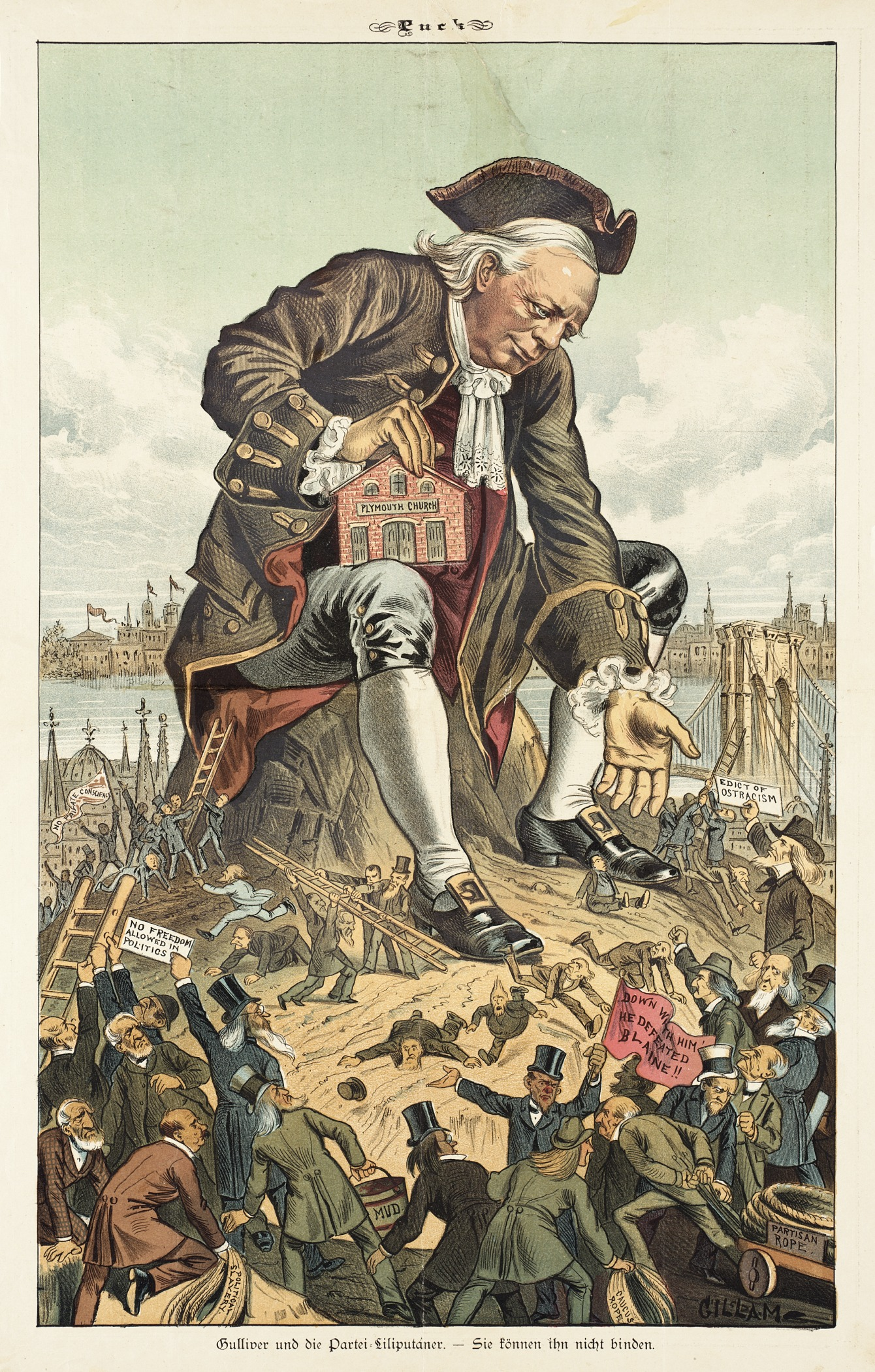
"Gulliver and the party Liliputians" (1885), portraying Henry Ward Beecher as Gulliver
