= Cardboard modeling =

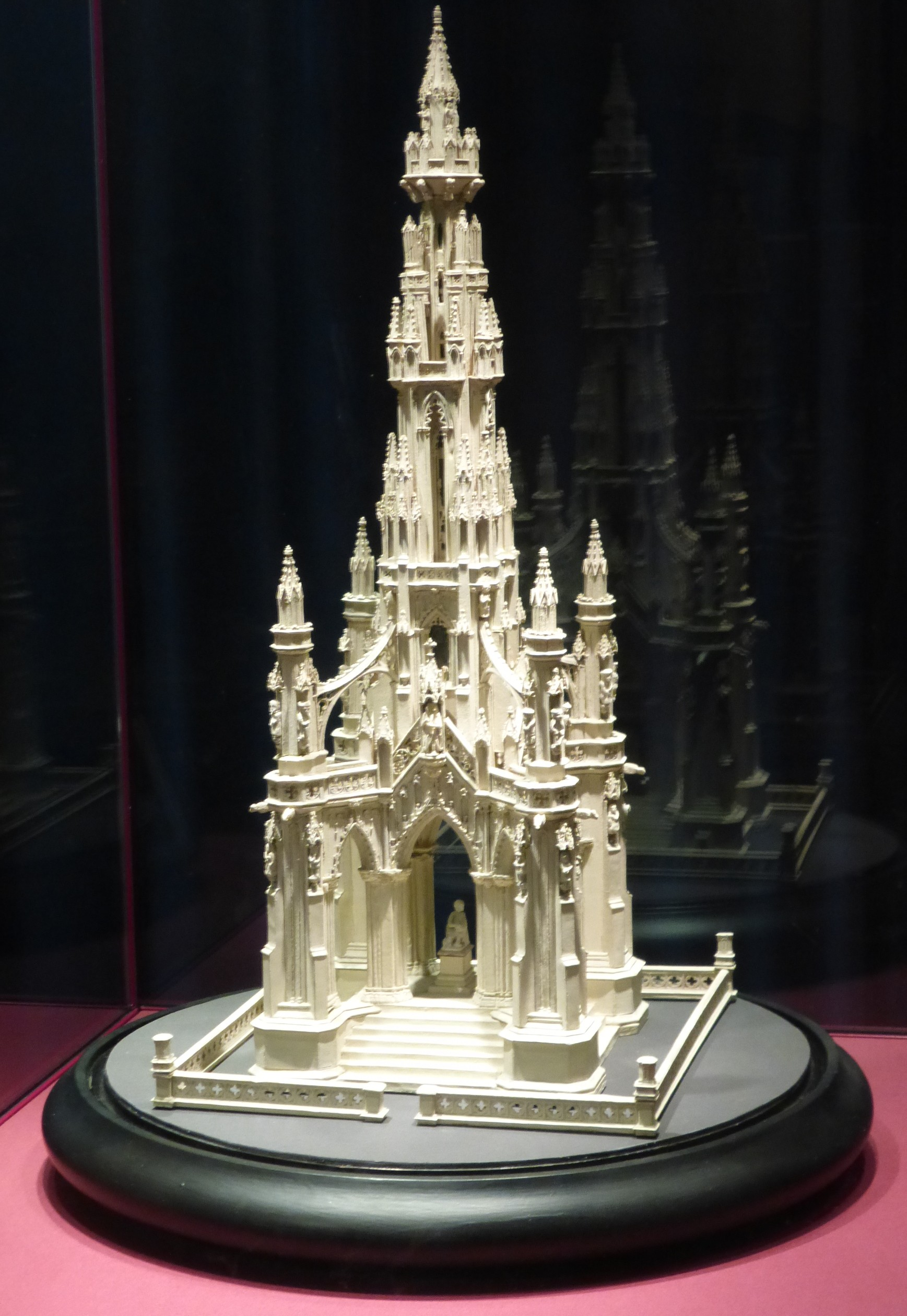
Cardboard model of the Scott Monument, Edinburgh (1860)

Cardboard modeling or cardboard engineering is a form of modelling with paper, card stock, paperboard, and corrugated fiberboard. The term cardboard engineering is sometimes used to differentiate from the craft of making decorative cards. It is often referred to as paper modelling although in practice card is generally used.

== History ==
Originally this was a form of modelling undertaken because of the low cost involved. Card, a means of cutting and glue are all that is needed. Some models are 100% card, while others use items of other materials to reinforce the model. After World War II cardboard models were promoted by a number of model companies. One company, ERG (Bournemouth) Ltd. produced a book "Cardboard Rolling Stock and How to Build It" and Superquick are still well known for their range of printed and pre-cut kits.

Books of printed models to cut out and make have been around a long time. Also, specially printed cards were available from which models could be made. In the UK Micromodels were known for very small card models.

Models to cut out were also a feature of paperboard folding cartons. For many years, breakfast cereal makers had models to cut out on their packets.

The hobby has been revived through the use of ink-jet and laser colour printers, with the availability of inexpensive cutting plotters and laser engravers also reducing the time, effort, and tedium associated with cutting out the many parts. Using a vector graphics package, it is even possible for anyone to create their own models from scratch, though most use special software.

Models to cut out can also be downloaded from the internet.

== See also ==
- Net (polyhedron)
- Paper model
- Architectural model
