= F(g) Scholar =

Graphing, spreadsheet, and calculation software from Future Graph

f(g) Scholar
- Developer: Future Graph
- Operating system: MS-DOS, Windows, Classic Mac OS, OS/2
- Type: Educational software, graphing software

f(g) Scholar also known as fg Scholar was a graphing, spreadsheet, and calculator software package published by Future Graph. Although originally targeted towards technical academia in the fields of math, science, and engineering primarily college students and teachers, the software gained acceptance in the business world.

fg Scholar included a calculator, its own programming language with macro support, the ability to import graphics, an automated formula builder, math templates, a spreadsheet with graphing capability, a vector drawing module, and the ability to export files in a number of formats.

== Features ==
f(g) Scholar provided 12 types of charts including: bar, pie, area, three-dimensional area.

f(g) Scholar supported the following graphic types: .WPG, .WMF, .CLP, .CGM, and .PIC.

== Bibliography ==
- Educom (1995). Educom review. Educom. p. 14.
- PC magazine: the independent guide to IBM-standard personal computing. PC Communications Corp. 1995-01-01. p. 54.
- THE Journal: Technological Horizons in Education. Information Synergy, Inc. 1992-08-01. p. 46–47.
- THE Journal: Technological Horizons in Education. Information Synergy, Inc. 1995. p. 6.
- ASEE prism. American Society for Engineering Education. 1993-01-01. p. 33.
- Lehnert, Wendy G. (1998-01-15). Internet 101: a beginner's guide to the Internet and the World Wide Web. Addison Wesley Longman. p. 133. ISBN 978-0-201-32553-9.
- THE Journal: Technological Horizons in Education. Information Synergy, Inc. 1995. p. 12.
- David C. Arney; Daniel J. Arney (November 1995). "Software Reviews". The College Mathematics Journal. 26 (5). Mathematical Association of America: 401–404. doi:10.1080/07468342.1995.11973739. JSTOR 2687389.
- "Undergrads help beta test physics SW". THE Journal: Technological Horizons in Education. 20. December 1, 1992.
