= Architectural model =

Design model

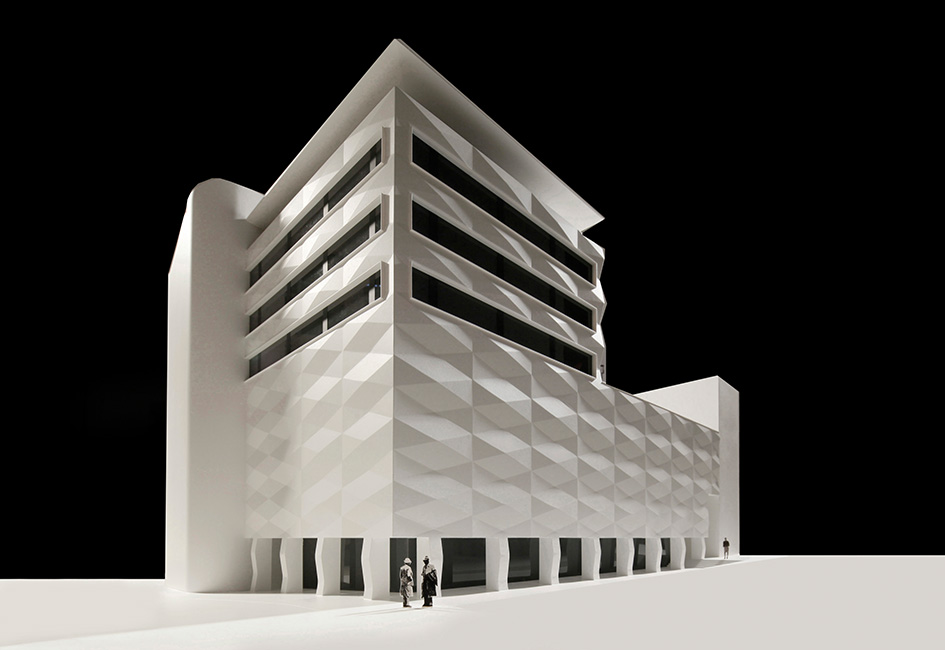
An architectural model of the Sonnenhof in Rapperswil, with scale human figures in front of it

An architectural model promoting a highrise condominium

An architectural model is a type of scale model made to study aspects of an architectural design or to communicate design intent. They are made using a variety of materials including paper, plaster, plastic, resin, wood, glass, and metal.

Models are built either with traditional handcraft techniques or via 3D printing technologies such as stereolithography, fused filament fabrication, and selective laser sintering.

== History ==
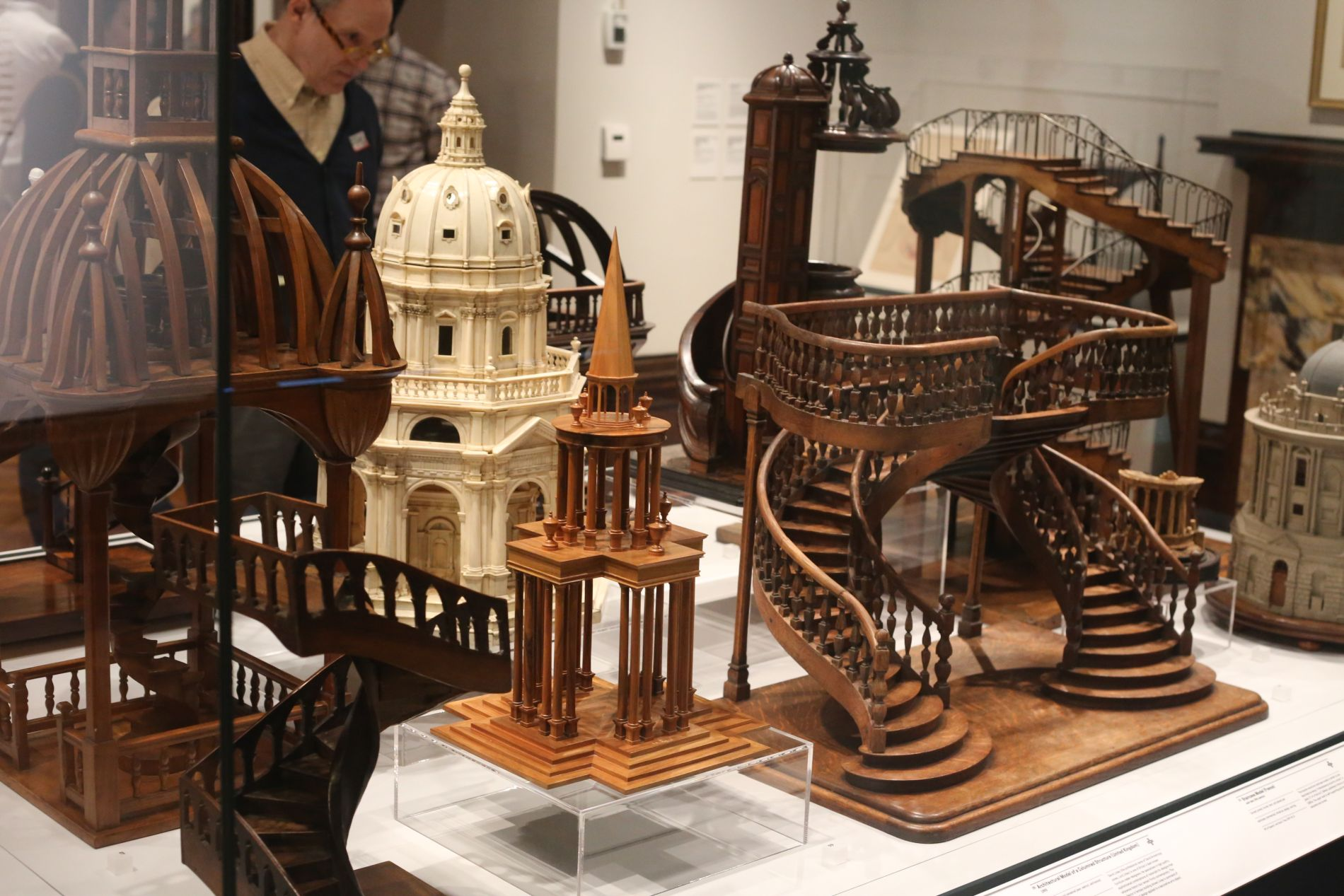
Architectural models on view at the Cooper Hewitt museum in New York

The use of architectural models dates to pre-history. Some of the oldest standing models were found in Malta at Tarxien Temples. Those models are now stored at the National Museum of Archaeology in Malta.

== Purpose ==
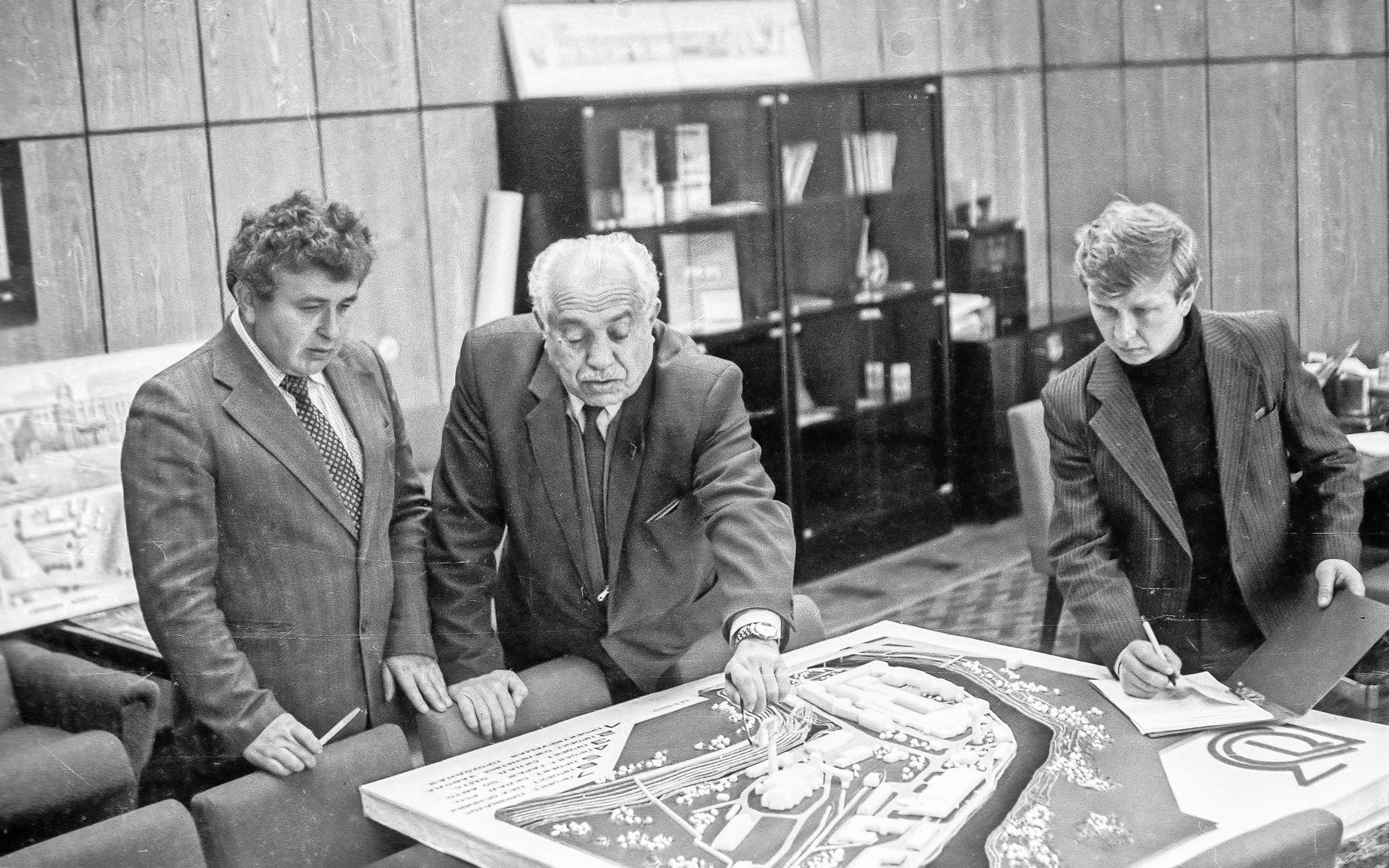
Project managers discuss the plant development using an architectural model

Architectural models are used by architects for a range of purposes, including:

- Ad hoc or "sketch" models are sometimes made to study the interaction of volumes, different viewpoints, or concepts during the design process. They're useful in explaining a complicated or unusual design to builders. They also serve as a focus for discussion between architects, engineers, and town planners.
- Presentation models can be used to exhibit, visualize, or sell a final design.

A model also serves as a show piece. Once a building is finished, the model is sometimes featured in a common area of the building.

Types of models include:

- Exterior models are models of buildings that usually include some landscaping or civic spaces around the building.
- Interior models are models showing interior space planning, finishes, colors, furniture, and beautification.
- Landscaping design models are models of landscape design and development, representing features such as walkways, small bridges, pergolas, vegetation patterns, and beautification. Landscape design models usually represent public spaces and, in some cases, include buildings as well.
- Urban models are typically built at a much smaller scale (starting from 1:500 and less, 1:700, 1:1000, 1:1200, 1:2000, and 1:20,000), representing several city blocks, even a town or village, a large resort, a campus, an industrial facility, a military base, and so on. Urban models are a tool for town and city planning and development. Urban models of large urban areas are displayed at museums such as the Shanghai Urban Planning Exhibition Center, the Queens Museum in New York, the Beijing Planning Exhibition Hall, and the Singapore City Gallery.
- Engineering and construction models show isolated building or structure elements and components and their interactions.
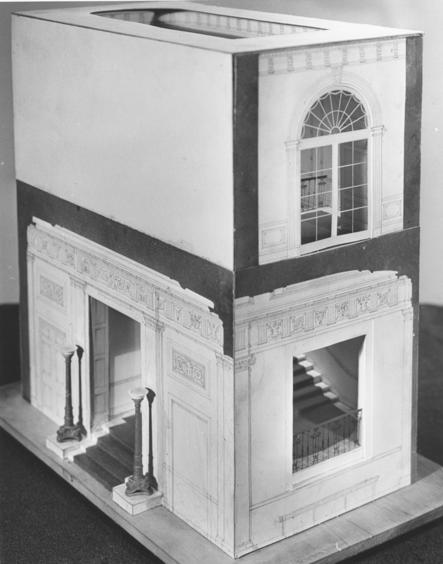
A model by architect Lorenzo Winslow which he used to explore the structure of the Grand Staircase at the White House for his redesign of the East Wing.

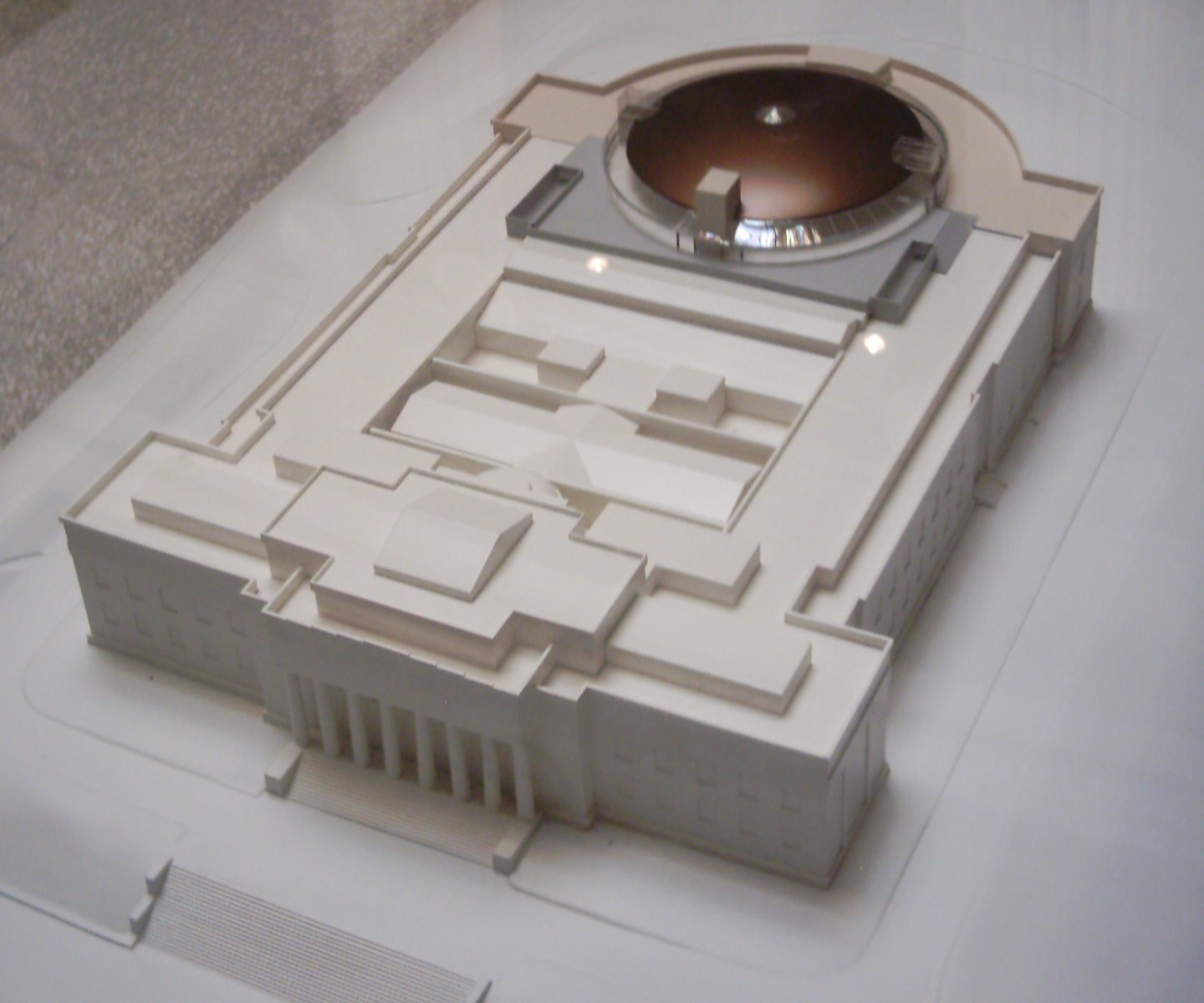
Model of a museum building.

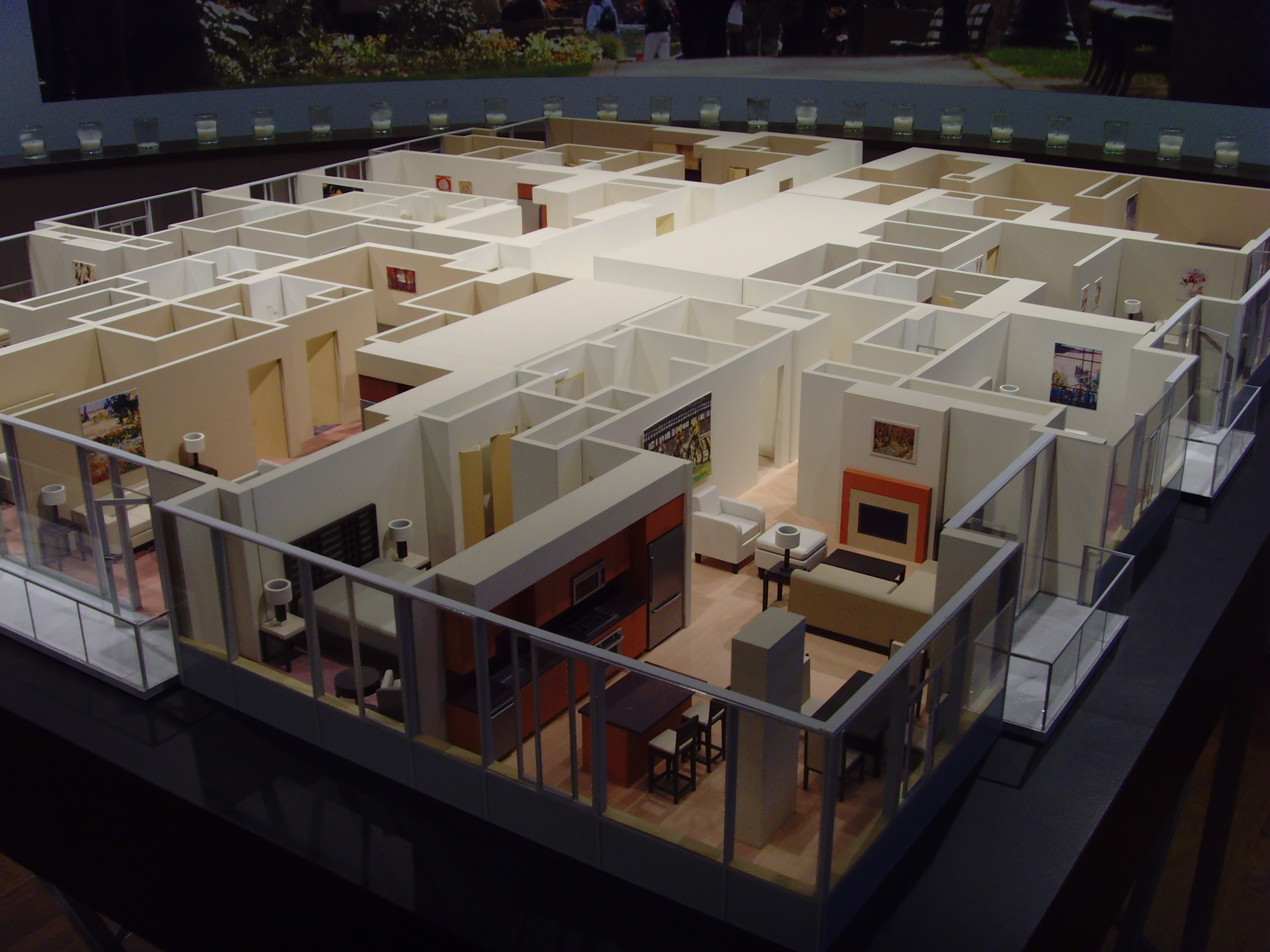
Model of a building interior.

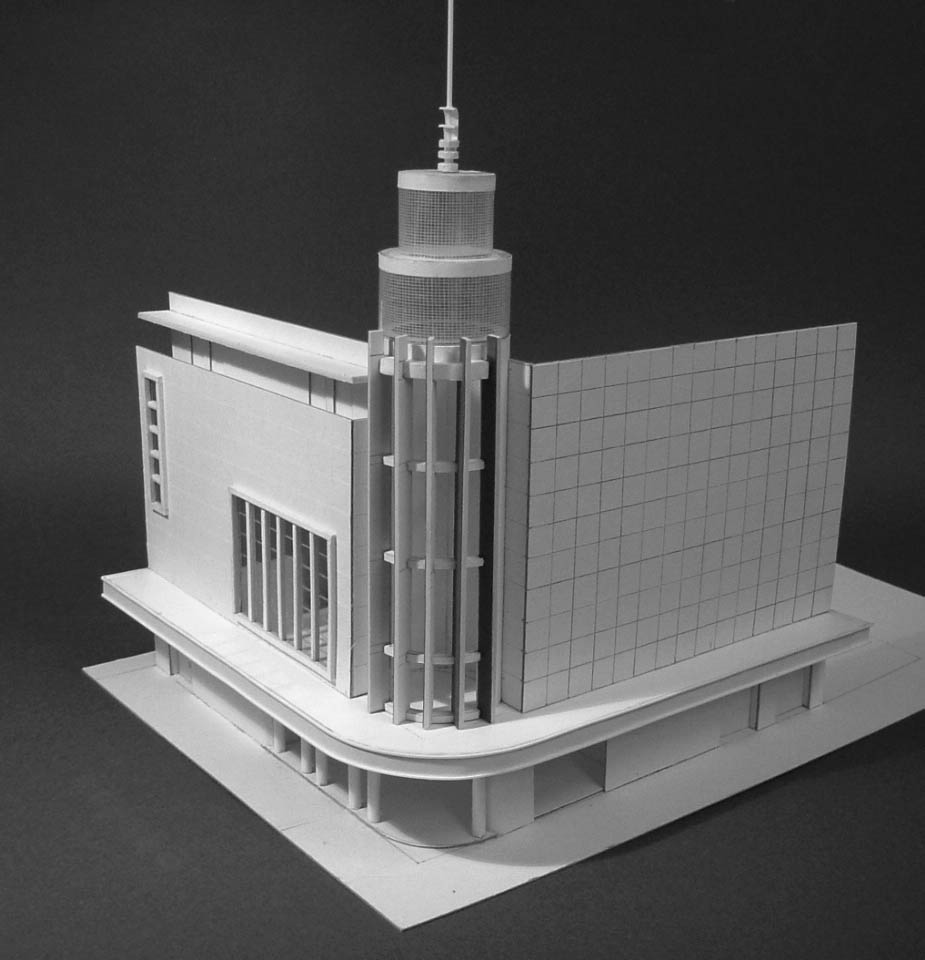
A scale replica model of the now demolished Capitol Theatre in Causeway Bay, Hong Kong

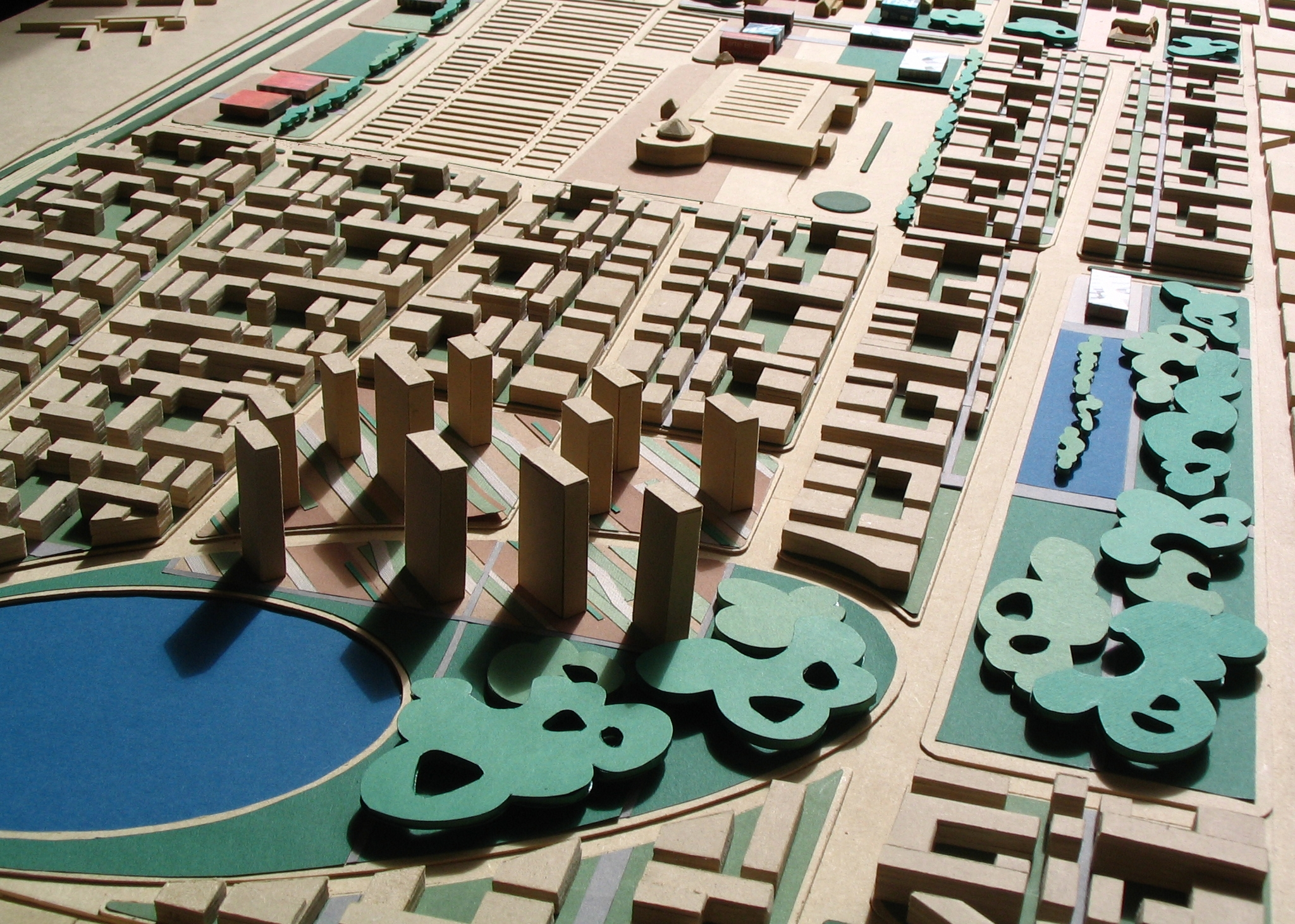
A model used for urban planning in the Buenos Aires Province

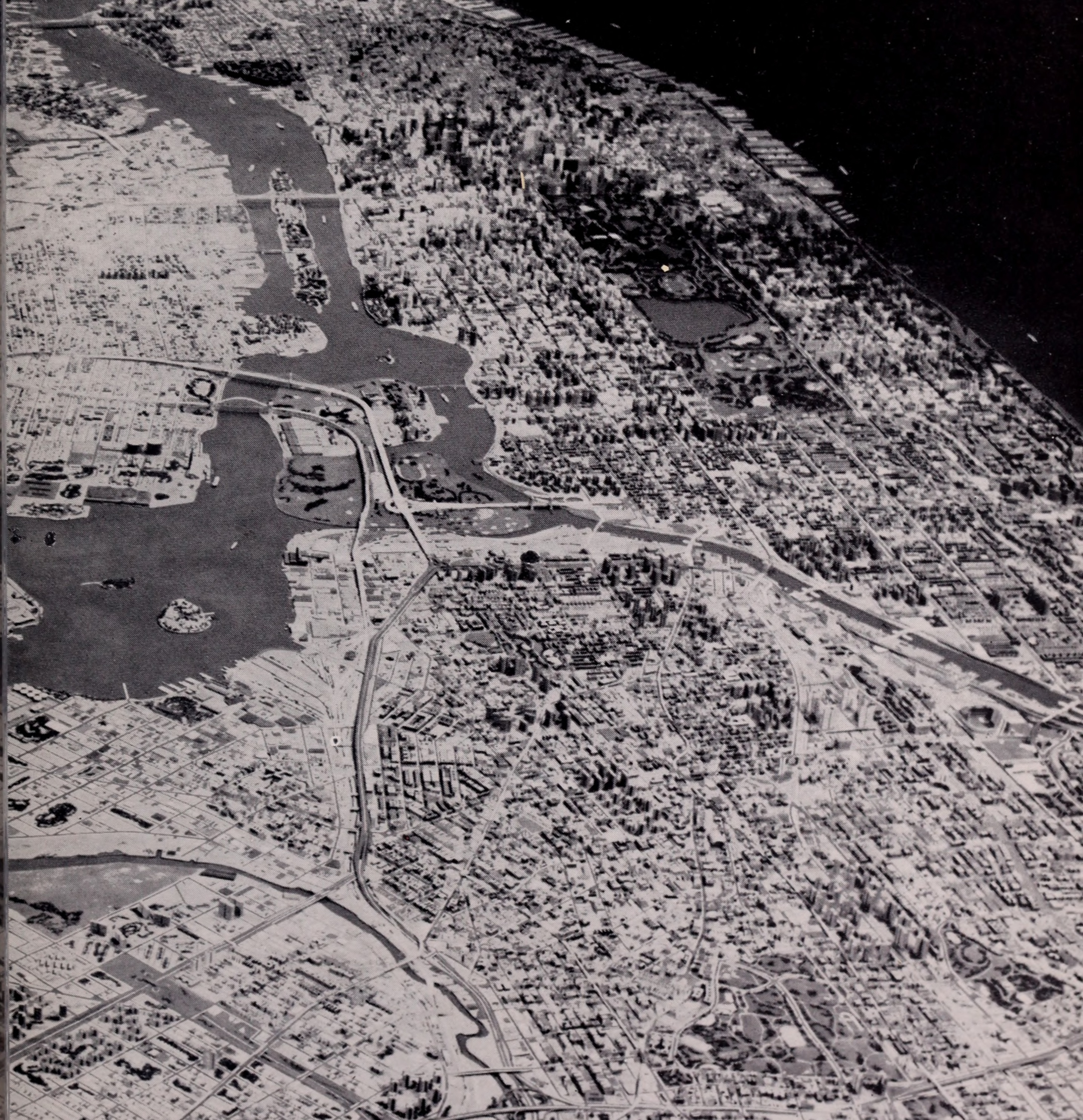
Model of New York City, World's Fair (1964)

== Virtual modeling ==
Buildings are increasingly designed in software with CAD (computer-aided design) systems. Early virtual modeling involved the fixing of arbitrary lines and points in virtual space, mainly to produce technical drawings. Modern packages include advanced features such as databases of components, automated engineering calculations, visual fly-throughs, dynamic reflections, and accurate textures and colors.

As an extension to CAD (computer-aided design) and BIM (building information modeling), virtual reality architectural sessions are also being adopted. This technology enables participants to be immersed in a 1:1 scale model, essentially experiencing the building before it is built.

=== List of CAD and BIM software ===
- Autodesk Revit
- AutoCAD
- Rhinoceros 3D
- SketchUp
- ARCHICAD
- Vectorworks
- Autodesk 3ds Max

== Materials ==
Rough study models can be made quickly using cardboard, wooden blocks, polystyrene, foam, foam boards, and other materials. Such models are an efficient design tool for the three-dimensional understanding of a structure, space, or form, and are used by architects, interior designers, and exhibit designers.

Common materials used for centuries in the construction of architectural models were card stock, balsa wood, basswood, and other woods. Modern professional architectural model builders use 21st-century materials, such as Taskboard (a flexible and lightweight wood/fiberboard), plastics, wooden and wood-plastic composites, foams, foam board, and urethane compounds.

Several companies produce ready-made pieces for structural components (e.g., girders, beams), siding, furniture, figures (people), vehicles, trees, bushes, and other features that are found in the models. Features such as vehicles, people figurines, trees, streetlights, and others are called "scenery elements" and serve not only to beautify the model but also to help the observer obtain a correct feel of the scale and proportions represented by the model.

Increasingly, rapid prototyping techniques such as 3D printing and CNC routing are used to automatically construct models directly from CAD plans.

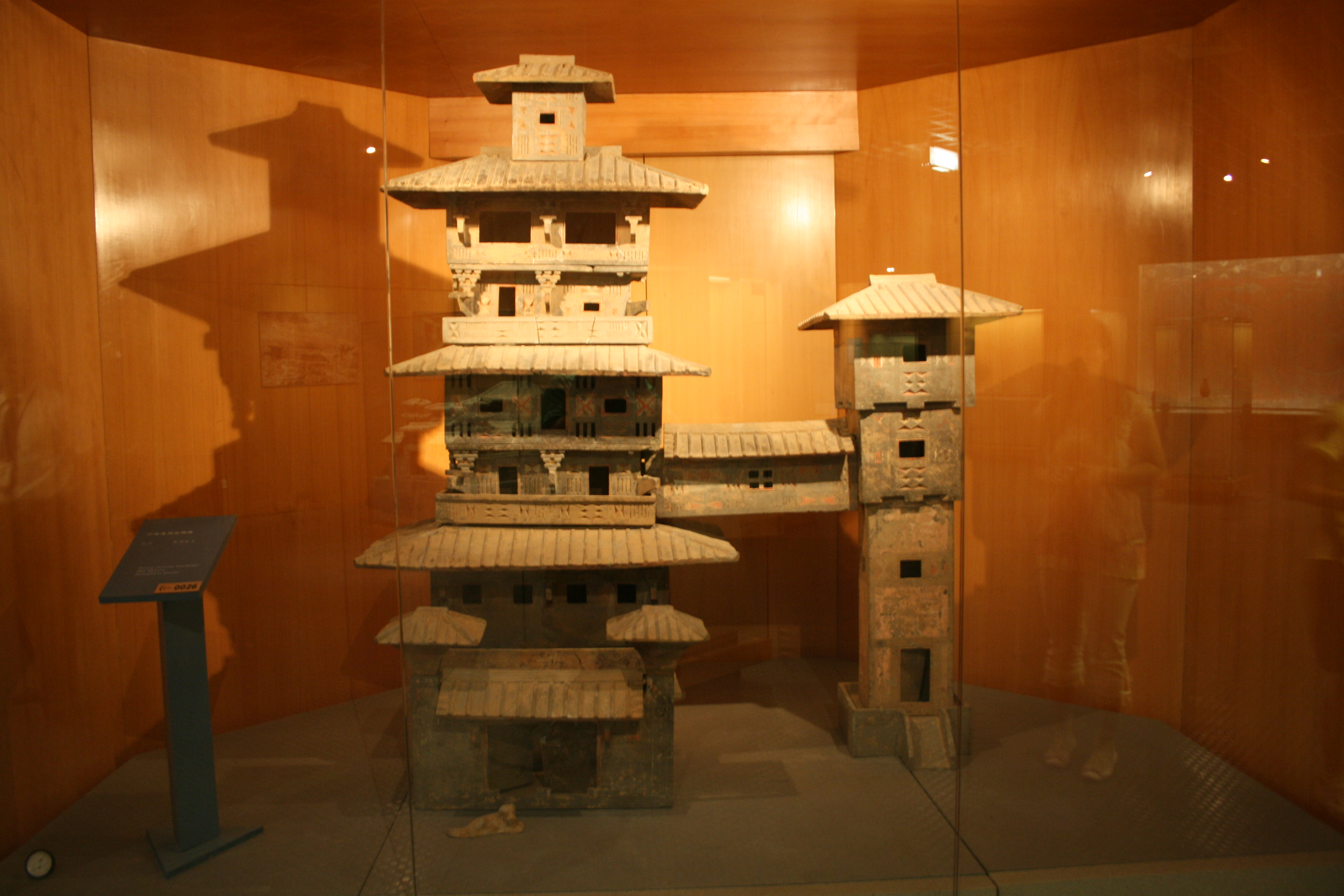
An earthenware model of two residential towers, made during the Han dynasty in China.

Paper architectural models of a bungalow, office and house.

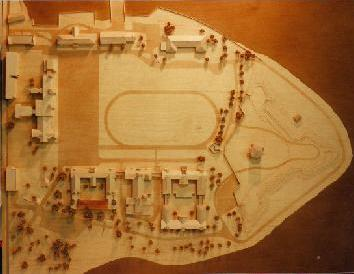
A wooden exterior model of the Royal Military College of Canada grounds.

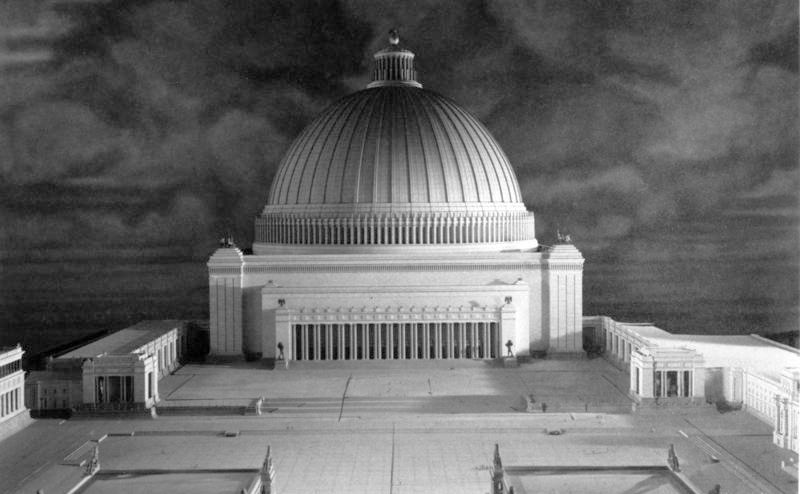
Painted wood model of the Volkshalle in Hitler's planned Germania project.

=== Cork models ===
A cork model is an architectural model made predominantly of cork. The art of cork modeling is also called phelloplasty (Greek φελλός phellos, cork).

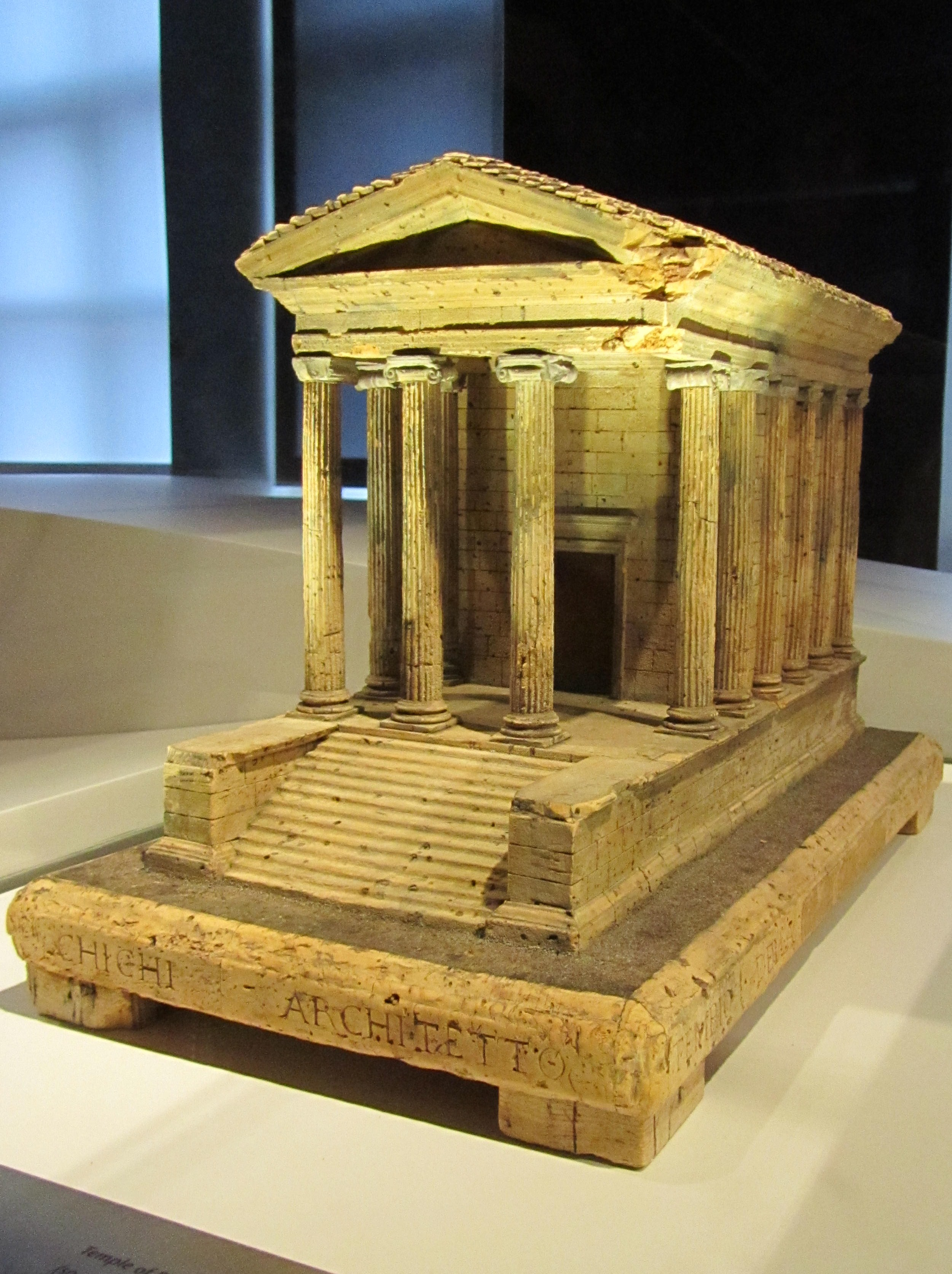
cork model of the Temple of Portunus

In Napoli in the sixteenth century, cork was being used to create Christmas cribs. The 18th and early 19th centuries saw an increase in the popularity of crib-making there.

The invention of architectural models made of cork was self-attributed to Augusto Rosa (1738–1784), but Giovanni Altieri (documented 1766–1790) and Antonio Chichi (1743–1816) were already active in Rome as manufacturers of cork models.

Chichi's models were copied by Carl May (1747–1822) and his son Georg Heinrich May (1790–1853).

Other artists include Luigi Carotti (Rome), Carlo Lucangeli (1747–1812, Rome, Naples), Domenico Padiglione and his sons Agostino and Felice (Naples), and Auguste Pelet (1785–1865, Nîmes). In Marseille, several scale models were made representing archaeological digs by Hippolyte Augier (1830–1889) (Marseille History Museum/Musée d’Histoire de Marseille) or Stanislas Clastrier (1857–1925).

Dieter Cöllen is an example of a contemporary phelloplast that continues the art.

==== Collections ====
Many cork models of classical monuments in Italy were made and sold to tourists during their Grand Tour. Cork, especially when carefully painted, was ideal to reproduce the weathered look of wall surfaces.

As a rule, they were produced on a large scale (the Colosseum in Aschaffenburg is three meters long and one meter high) and with high precision.

Cork models were esteemed in the princely courts of the 18th century. They were also acquired for their scientific value by schools of architecture in the late 18th and early 19th centuries, or by institutions like the Society of Antiquaries of London and the British Museum, as a way of introducing the general public to ancient architecture.

Despite their fragility, cork models have often survived better than wooden models threatened by wood-destroying insects.

Apart from kings and princes, cork models were collected by people such as Filippo Farsetti (1703–1744) in Venice, Pierre Gaspard Marie Grimod d'Orsay (1748–1809), and the architect Louis-François Cassas in France, Charles Townley, or Sir J. Soane in London, who turned his home into a museum, and Sir John Soane's Museum, housing a collection of 14 models in cork of Roman and Greek buildings.

Chichi's cork models can be found at the Imperial Academy of Arts in Saint Petersburg, Russia (34 models made around 1774); Schloss Wilhelmshöhe, Kassel (33 models made 1777–1782); Hessisches Landesmuseum Darmstadt (26 models acquired 1790–91); and the Herzogliches Museum Gotha (12 models acquired after 1777–1778; see Wikipedia in German).

The largest collection of cork models by Carl May, with 54 pieces (after war losses), is in Aschaffenburg (Schloss Johannisburg); another large collection of his models is in the Staatliches Museum Schwerin.

In France, the Musée des Antiquités Nationales à Saint-Germain-en-Laye has works by Rosa, Lucandeli and Pelet. The Musée archéologique de Nîmes (Musée archéologique de Nîmes) and the Marseille History Museum also have cork models.

Modern cork models of antique buildings by Dieter Cöllen are exhibited in the Praetorium in Cologne.

== Scales ==
Architectural models are being constructed at a much smaller scale than their 1:1 counterpart.

The scales and their architectural use are broadly as follows:

- 1:1 full (or real) size for details
- 1:2 Details
- 1:5 Details
- 1:10 Interior spaces and furniture
- 1:20 Interior spaces and furniture
- 1:50 Interior spaces, detailed floor plans, and different floor levels
- 1:100 Building plans and layouts
- 1:200 Building plans and layouts
- 1:500 Building layouts or site plans
- 1:1000 Urban scale for site or location plans
- 1:1250 Site plans
- 1:2500 Site plans and city maps
- 1:5000 City maps/Island

Sometimes model railroad scales such as 1:160 and 1:87 are used due to the ready availability of commercial figures, vehicles, and trees in those scales, and models of large buildings are most often built in approximately that range of scales due to size considerations.

== See also ==
- Architectural rendering
- Maquette
- Mockup
- Origamic architecture (OA)
- Scale model
- Superquick
- Cardboard modeling
