= Leo Monahan =

Leo Monahan may refer to:

- Leo Monahan (artist) (born 1933), American artist
- Leo Monahan (sportswriter) (1926–2013), American sportswriter
