= Future Graph =

Future Graph, Inc.
- Type: Graphing software
- Genre: Educational software
- Founder: Bob Blitshtein; Steve Boymel
- Headquarters: 75 James Way; Southampton, Pennsylvania 18966
- Products: f(g) Scholar
- Revenue: $2.5 million

Future Graph, Inc. also known as Futuregraph was a publisher of math and science educational software used in hundreds of secondary schools and universities. They are best known for f(g) Scholar, a data analysis program which featured a scientific calculator, graphing, and spreadsheet.

== Software ==
In addition to f(g) Scholar, Future Graph sold other software including a Personal Professor, Home Teachers Series, and also a collection of clipart.

== Bibliography ==
- Technological horizons in education journal. Information Synergy, Inc. 1995. p. 6.
- Physics, American Institute of (1996). Computers in physics. American Institute of Physics. p. 107.
