= Paper snowflake =

Paper craft

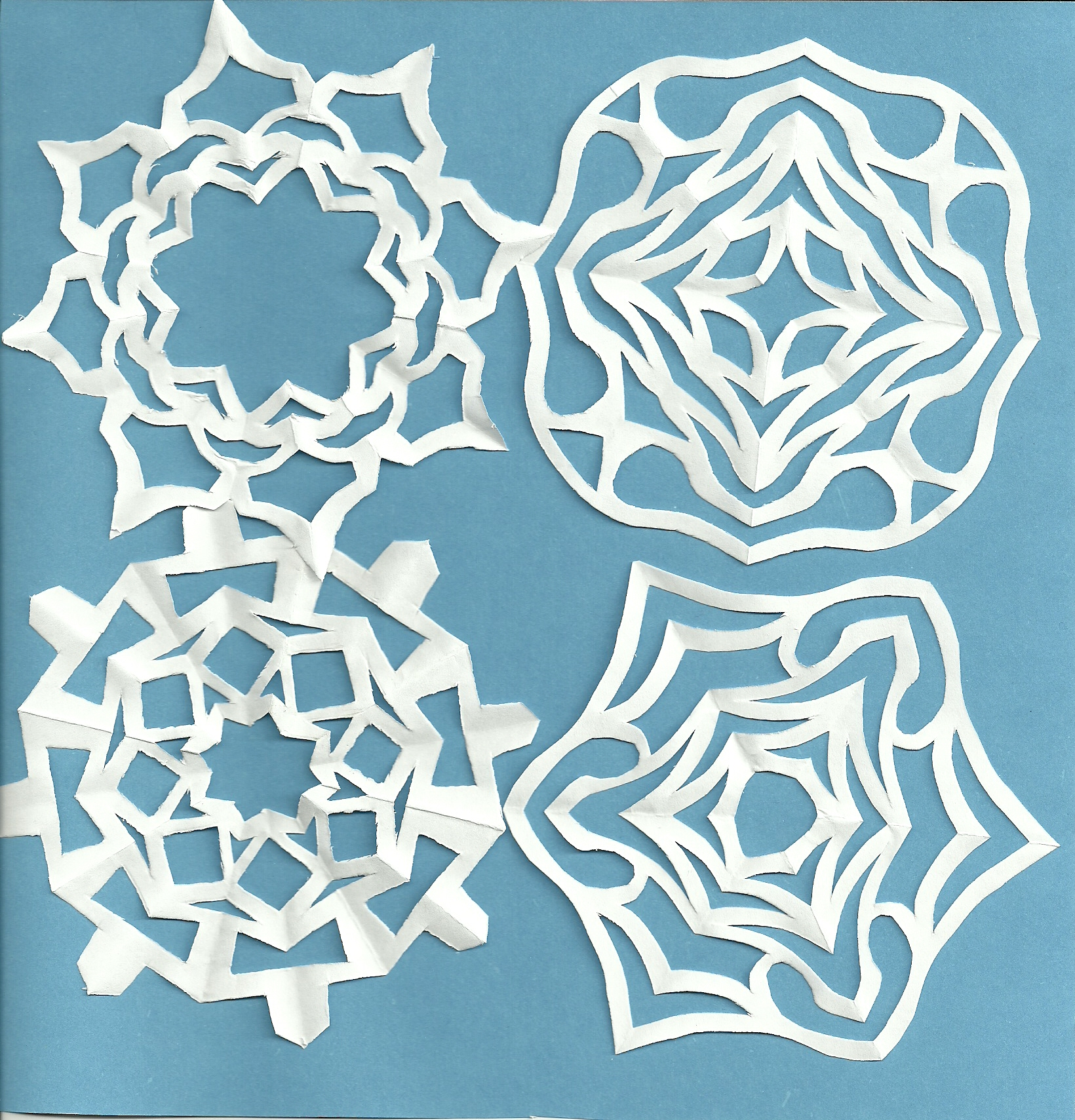
An example of various paper snowflake designs

A paper snowflake is a type of paper craft based on a snowflake that combines origami with papercutting. The designs can vary significantly after doing mandatory folding.

An online version of the craft is known as "Make-A-Flake", and was created by Barkley Inc. in 2008.

== See also ==
- Fold-and-cut theorem
- Kirigami
