= Singapore City Gallery =

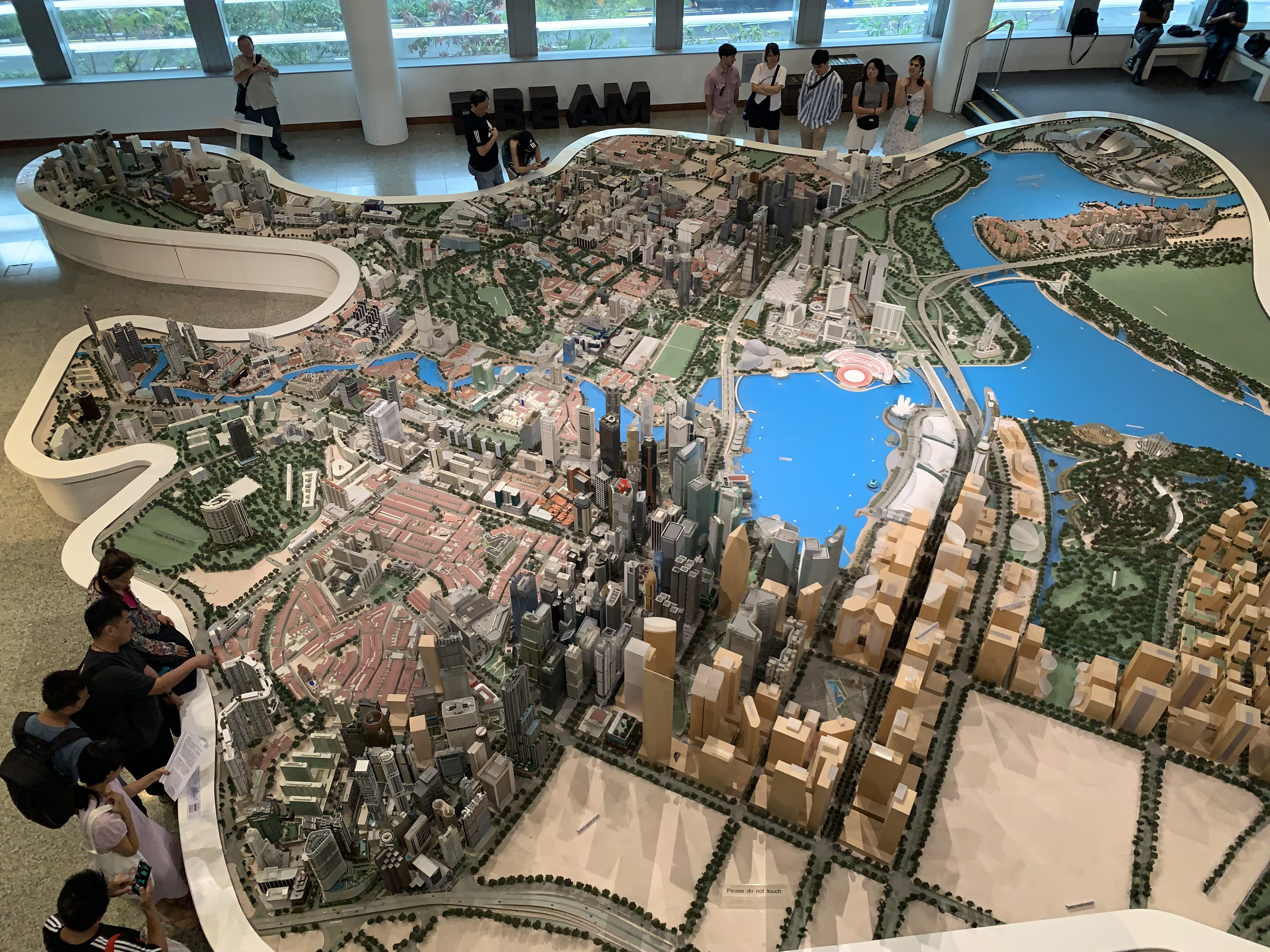
- Central Area Model at the Singapore City Gallery
- Former name: URA Gallery
- Established: 27 January 1999
- Location: 45 Maxwell Road, Singapore
- Coordinates: 1°16′47.42″N 103°50′42.5″E
- Type: Urban planning museum
- Visitors: 150,000 (annually)
- Owner: Urban Redevelopment Authority
- Public transit access: Chinatown (North East Line/Downtown Line), Tanjong Pagar (East–West Line)
- Website: www.ura.gov.sg/Corporate/Singapore-City-Gallery

Singapore City Gallery, formerly known as the URA Gallery, is a three-storey visitor centre located in The URA Centre, Singapore that charts Singapore's urban transformation and future plans. It was established in January 1999 and is managed by the Urban Redevelopment Authority (URA). It features a large model replica of the Central Area of Singapore.

== Aim ==
The Gallery aims to showcase Singapore’s physical transformation in the last 50 years to become "one of the most liveable cities in Asia." It also aims to explain how "forward-looking, long-term and integrated land use planning and partnership between private and public sectors is achieved" in Singapore. The Gallery also presents "creative solutions to balancing different competing needs, the many live, work, play opportunities planned for, extensive conservation efforts and urban design strategies to create a more distinctive Singapore."

== History ==
The gallery, which had an initial cost of 4.2 million Singapore dollars, was opened on 27 January 1999 by Lim Hng Kiang, who was National Development Minister at the time. The gallery was initially projected to attract 36,000 visitors a year over the first three years of its existence, most of whom were expected to be students or local community groups. In 2004, the gallery underwent a major renovation of 80% of its exhibits. Upon its reopening on 3 December 2004, the Gallery was renamed the Singapore City Gallery. The Gallery's key exhibit, the Central Area Model, was also expanded to include areas which were formerly not shown, such as Orchard Road, Kampong Glam, Little India, Bras Basah, and Bugis. The model was also updated to include the latest plans for Marina Bay. In 2008, the Gallery received its millionth visitor. In 2011, the gallery was redesigned again, and reopened in August of that year, to include new exhibits such as a 270-degree panorama of life in Singapore and an 8-player multimedia game on urban planning. This latest version won honours in the Singapore Design Award 2012 for both the Events/Exhibitions category and the Multidisciplinary Design category. The Gallery now receives about 150,000 visitors annually.

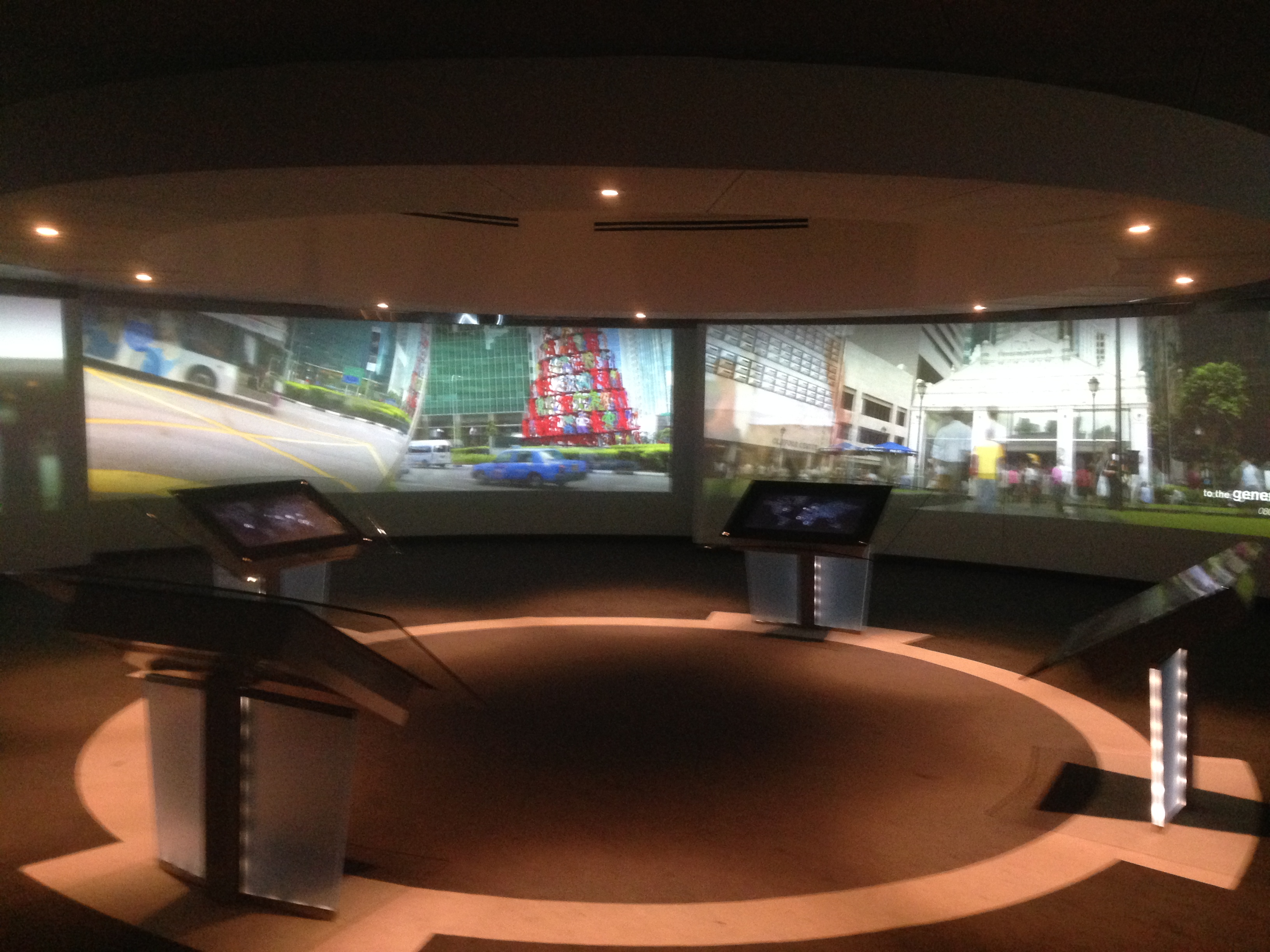
270 degree video panorama "A Day in Singapore

== Gallery ==
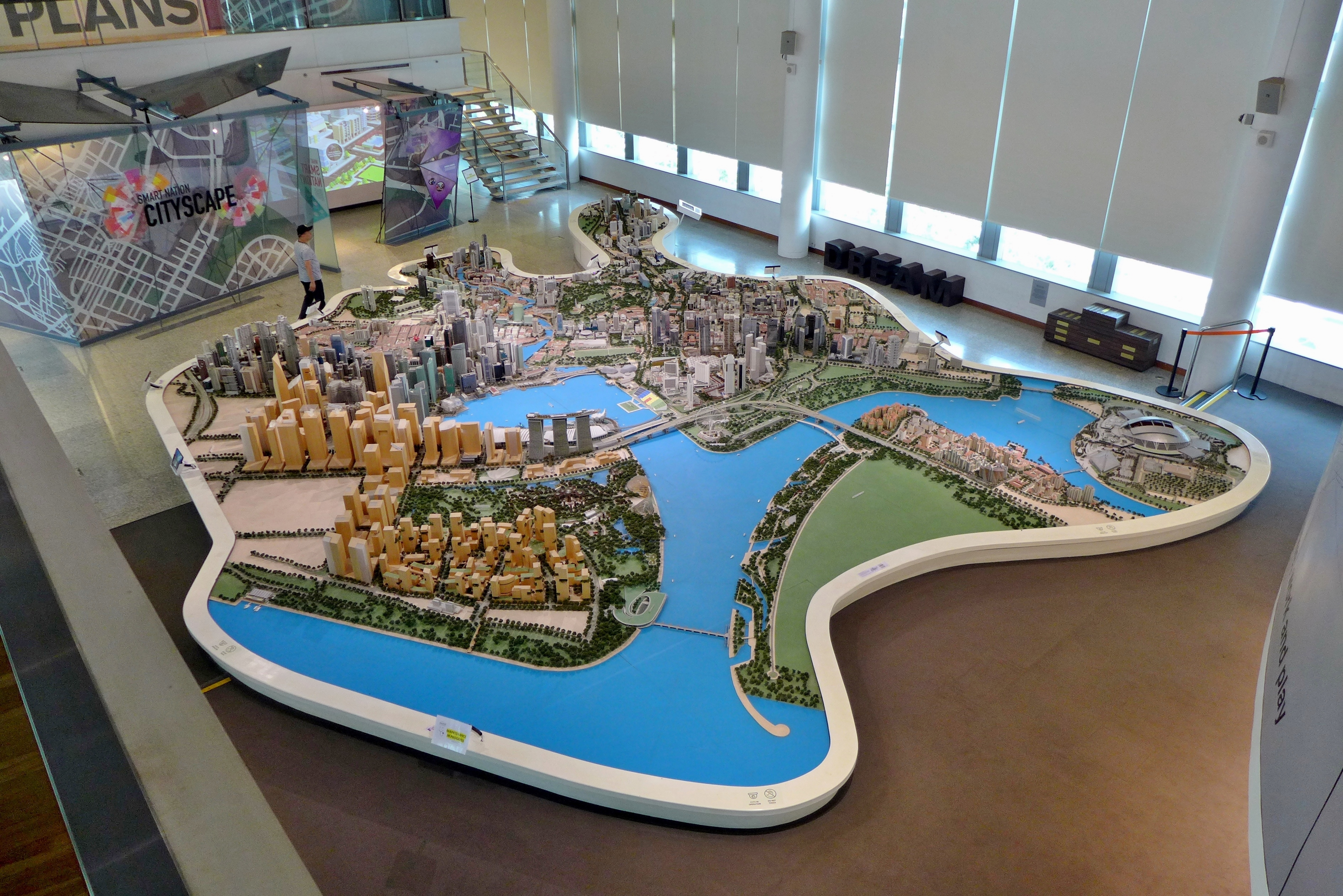
Photo of the Singapore City Gallery's Central Area Model, taken from the third floor of the gallery. Entire model visible, from Tanjong Pagar at left to the National Stadium at right.

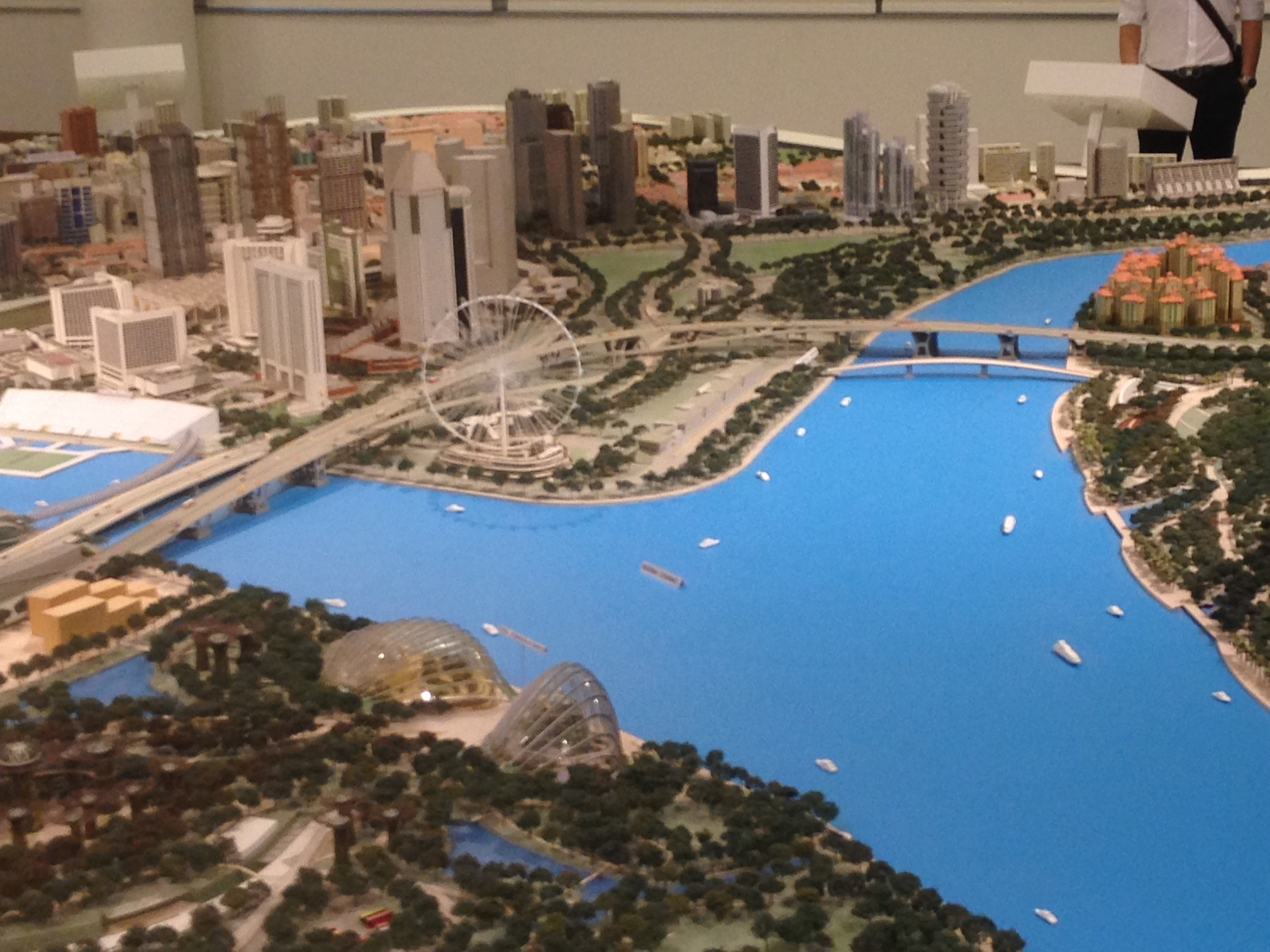
Photo of the Singapore City Gallery's Central Area Model, taken from second floor of gallery. Focuses on Kallang Bay area. Gardens by the Bay, Tanjong Rhu and Singapore Flyer all visible.

Singapore City Gallery, the only permanent exhibit that tells the story of the nation's physical planning efforts, has 10 thematic areas and more than 50 audiovisual and interactive exhibits occupying the first three floors of the Urban Redevelopment Authority building on Maxwell Road in the Central Area. The first floor is reserved for temporary displays on topics such as urban planning, architecture, and other areas relevant to the Urban Redevelopment Authority's remit. The second floor houses a scale replica of central Singapore, called the Central Area Model. The third floor comprises permanent exhibits on topics such as preservation of historically significant buildings, sustainable development, and urban design. The Gallery as a whole occupies a total area of 2,400 square metres. The gallery is open from 9am to 5pm from Monday to Saturday, and is closed on Sundays and public holidays.

=== Central Area Model ===
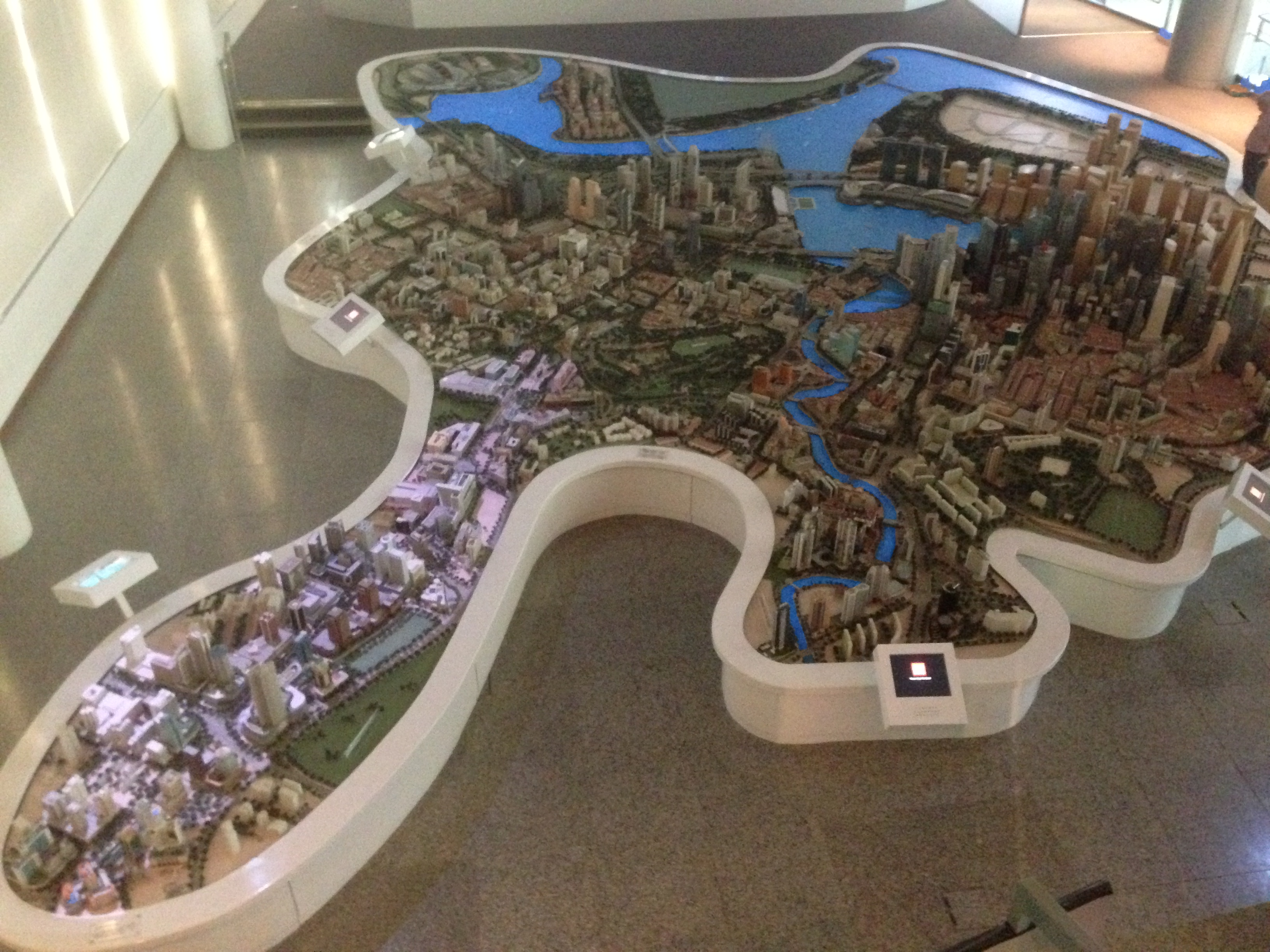
Photo of Central Area Model, taken during light and sound show at Singapore City Gallery. Orchard Road, at bottom left, is highlighted by purple light.

The Central Area Model is an 11 metre by 10 metre architectural model of Central Singapore. Modelled at a scale of 1:400, it is mainly constructed from balsa wood and acrylic, and is composed of various individual area models built for public consultations in past decades, which were then assembled in 1998 into one large model for display in the Gallery. The model is frequently updated and is used by Urban Redevelopment Authority architects as a working model of the area to simulate new growth areas and discuss options between community, developers and government. In addition to showing currently existing buildings in the area, the model also models plans for as-yet-unbuilt buildings.

=== Central Area Discoverer ===
The Gallery, designed for self-discovery, has many interactive exhibits and stations, one of which is Central Area Discoverer, an interactive library of more than 100 video stories and 1,000 pictures of the centre's past, present and future, the urban planning efforts in finding innovative solution to space constraints and a growing population, balancing old world charm with an ultra modern cityscape. The Discoverer is the interactive core of Rediscover Singapore, a unique online cultural resource for residents that was honoured a Finalist of the Stockholm Challenge Award in 2008, under the Culture Category. The Award is an annual international award selected by a jury comprising some of the foremost global IT-entrepreneurs.
