= Leo Monahan (artist) =

American artist (1933–2025)

- Born: January 7, 1933; Lead, South Dakota, U.S.
- Died: February 13, 2025 (aged 92)
- Education: Chouinard Art Institute
- Known for: Paper art

Leo Monahan (January 7, 1933 – February 13, 2025) was an American artist known for his illustrious imagination, his skill at paper sculpture, and his mastery of color. Leo Monahan created vibrant multi-dimensional artworks that told stories.

Mr. Monahan was the first person to receive a Disney Art Scholarship to attend the Chouinard Art Institute. Today, Chouinard is the California Institute of the Arts. After graduation, Monahan worked with Disney for 50 years.

As a master of color, Mr, Monahan employed the advanced principles of Johannes Itten. Monahan was fascinated by the BauHaus art movement, and he taught at the California Institute of Arts, or Cal Arts. He also taught at the University of Southern California (USC) and Disney Imagineering. Later in his career, he taught collage and assemblage in his art studio, conveying basic design principles in a highly engaging manner.

In his art and in his teaching Monahan highlighted the concepts of elements in relation to one another and the power of symbols.

He was also proficient at the art of haiku. Many of his haiku poems, as well as his paper sculptures, carried the theme of fly fishing.

== Education ==
Chouinard Art Institute, 1954-1958.

== Career ==
Graphic Artist in L.A. decade where he designed over 1200 record album covers. He created his first paper sculpture in 1960. Since that time he became a pioneer of paper sculpture which he referred to as "Paper in Dimension".

Clients included: Toyota, Coca-Cola, and Nintendo.

One of his works is in the permanent collection of the Smithsonian Institution.

Mr. Monahan served as a president of the Society of Illustrators of Los Angeles.

=== Awards ===
- Life Time Achievement award from the Society of Illustrators of Los Angeles
- Life Time Achievement award California Institute of the Arts (2019)

== Personal life and death ==
Leo Monahan grew up in South Dakota. He served in the Korean War, and appreciated being part of an Honor Flight to Washington, DC.

Monahan died on February 13, 2025, at the age of 92.

== See also ==
- Leo Monahan
- Chouinard foundation
- Multidimensional art
