= Kirigami =

Art of folding and cutting paper

Kirigami (切り紙) is a variation of origami, the Japanese art of folding paper. In kirigami, the paper is cut as well as being folded, resulting in a three-dimensional design that stands away from the page. Kirigami typically does not use glue.

== Overview ==
In the United States, the term kirigami was coined by Florence Temko from Japanese kiri, 'cut', and kami, 'paper', in the title of her 1962 book, Kirigami, the Creative Art of Paper cutting. The book achieved enough success that the word kirigami was accepted as the Western name for the art of paper cutting.

Typically, kirigami starts with a folded base, which is then unfolded; cuts are then opened and flattened to make the finished design. Simple kirigami are usually symmetrical, such as snowflakes, pentagrams, or orchid blossoms. A difference between kirigami and the art of "full base", or 180-degree opening structures, is that kirigami is made out of a single piece of paper that has then been cut.

== Notable kirigami artists ==
- Seiji Fujishiro (born 1924–), a renowned kirie ('paper picture') artist known for his colourful kirigami, which have also been published as a book.
- Nahoko Kojima (born 1981–), a professional contemporary Japanese kirigami artist, who pioneered sculptural, three-dimensional kirigami.
- Giovanni Russo (born 1969–), a professional contemporary Italian kirigami artist, who pioneered monumental, three-dimensional postcards kirigami.

== See also ==
- History of origami
- Origamic architecture
- Paper cutting
- Paper model
- Fold-and-cut theorem
- Japanese craft
