= Multidimensional art =

Visual art style involving three dimensions

Joseph Csaky 1920, multidimensional relief, limestone, polychrome, 80 cm, Kröller-Müller Museum

Multidimensional art is art that cannot be represented on a two-dimensional flat canvas. Artists create a third dimension with paper or another medium. In multidimensional art an artist can make use of virtually any items (mediums).

== Materials used in multidimensional art ==
Many artists make use of the objects and items they find in nature and or man made items. Some artists use paper and others make use of rubber, plastic, or sculpture. Artists also use other man made items like: textiles, milk cartons, or beads.

Japanese born Nobuhiro Nakanishi puts photos on see through plastic and orders the photos in chronological order. He then mounts the photos on a wall in a line (stacking them) which gives the viewer a different perspective.

== Multi-dimensional artists ==
- Joseph Csaky
- Leo Monahan
- Nnenna Okore

== See also ==
- Art movement
- Creativity techniques
- Decorative arts
- List of art media
- List of artistic media
- List of art movements
- List of most expensive paintings
- List of most expensive sculptures
- List of art techniques
- List of sculptors
- Paper art
- Paper Art Museum
- Relief art
