= Micromodel =

1940s model-making product

Micromodels are a type of card model or paper model that was popular during the 1940s and 1950s in the United Kingdom. In 1941, Geoffrey Heighway invented and marketed a new concept in card models. He took the available concept of card models and miniaturized them so that an entire train or building could be wrapped in a packet of post cards. These packets usually sold for about a shilling, or pocket change.

When he released his product in the 1940s it caught on and Micro-modeling became a national pastime. The slogan "Your Workshop in a Cigar Box" is still widely quoted today among paper modelers. Their other slogan was: Three-Dimensional, Volumetric. During the war years, the models were especially popular as they were extremely portable and builders were able to work on them anywhere. Anecdotes say people liked them because they were small enough to take with you, so if you got stuck in a bomb shelter during an air raid, you had something interesting to do. Several of the railway Micromodels were distributed in Australia in the form of small stapled books, rather than individual postcards.

The subjects of original Micromodels included among other things, Trains, Planes, Ships, Boats, Buildings, Cars and a Dragon. There were 82 original Micromodel Packets. From these packets one could make up 121 separate models. Micromodels also released some items including how-to booklets and powdered glue. Heighway continued to release models from 1941 until he became seriously ill in 1956. He died in 1959. There were several models that Heighway had mentioned in his catalogs and advertising, that for one reason or another were never released. These were known as the "Might have beens."

Micromodels are considered collectable, and some rare originals can only be had for thousands of dollars. Others are more easily obtainable.

There have been other products similar to or based on Micromodels, including Modelcraft Ltd. and a set of books based on enlargements of some of Heighway's Micromodels, finished by Myles Mandell. Several designers have released new Micromodel style models, including MicromodelsUSA.

== See also ==
Cardboard engineering

== External links (alphabetical) ==
- DG Models - Owner of some of the original plates and producer of various Micromodels.
- Micromodels - London Ltd.
- MicromodelsUSA - Producer of New, Re-issued & Revised Micromodels.
