= Educational software =

Software intended for an educational purpose

Educational software is a term used for any computer software that is made for an educational purpose. It encompasses a range of software, from language learning software to classroom management software to reference software. The purpose of this software is to make some part of education more effective and efficient.

== History ==
=== 1946–1970s ===
The use of computer hardware and software in education and training dates to the early 1940s, when American researchers developed flight simulators which used analog computers to generate simulated onboard instrument data. One such system was the type19 synthetic radar trainer, built in 1943. From these early attempts in the WWII era through the mid-1970s, educational software was directly tied to the hardware, on which it ran. Pioneering educational computer systems in this era included the PLATO system (1960), developed at the University of Illinois, and TICCIT (1969).

In 1963, IBM partnered with Stanford University's Institute for Mathematical Studies in the Social Sciences (IMSSS), directed by Patrick Suppes, to develop the first large-scale CAI curriculum, implemented in schools in California and Mississippi.

In 1967 Computer Curriculum Corporation (CCC, now Pearson Education Technologies) was formed to market to schools the materials developed through the IBM partnership. Early terminals that ran educational systems cost over $10,000, putting them out of reach of most institutions.

Some programming languages from this period, such as p3 and LOGO (1967), were designed specifically for students and novice users. The PLATO IV system (1972) introduced features that later became standard in educational software, including bitmap graphics, primitive sound, and support for non-keyboard input devices, including the touchscreen.

=== 1970s–1980s ===
The arrival of the personal computer, with the Altair 8800 in 1975, changed the field of software in general, with specific implications for educational software. Whereas users prior to 1975 were dependent upon university or government owned mainframe computers with timesharing, users after this shift could create and use software for computers in homes and schools, computers available for less than $2000. By the early 1980s, the availability of personal computers including the Apple II (1977), Commodore PET (1977), VIC-20 (1980), and Commodore 64 (1982) allowed for the creation of companies and nonprofits which specialized in educational software. Broderbund and The Learning Company are key companies from this period, and MECC, the Minnesota Educational Computing Consortium, a key non-profit software developer. These and other companies designed a range of titles for personal computers, with the bulk of the software initially developed for the Apple II.

== Categories of educational software ==
=== Courseware ===
"Courseware" is a term that combines the words 'course' with 'software'. It was originally used to describe additional educational material intended as kits for teachers or trainers or as tutorials for students, usually packaged for use with a computer. The term's meaning and usage has expanded and can refer to the entire course and any additional material when used in reference an online or 'computer formatted' classroom. Many companies are using the term to describe the entire "package" consisting of one 'class' or 'course' bundled together with the various lessons, tests, and other material needed. The courseware itself can be in different formats: some are only available online, such as Web pages, while others can be downloaded as PDF files or other types of document. Many forms of educational technology are now covered by the term courseware. Most leading educational companies solicit or include courseware with their training packages.

=== Classroom aids ===
Some educational software is designed for use in school classrooms. Typically such software may be projected onto a large whiteboard at the front of the class and/or run simultaneously on a network of desktop computers in a classroom. The most notable are SMART Boards that use SMART Notebook to interact with the board which allows the use of pens to digitally draw on the board. This type of software is often called classroom management software. While teachers often choose to use educational software from other categories in their IT suites (e.g. reference works, children's software), a whole category of educational software has grown up specifically intended to assist classroom teaching. 'Wordshark', for example, was first released in the mid nineties with multi-sensory games to support students learning to read and spell. Branding has been less strong in this category than in those oriented towards home users. Software titles are often very specialized and produced by various manufacturers, including many established educational book publishers.

=== Assessment software ===
With the impact of environmental damage and the need for institutions to become "paperless", more educational institutions are seeking alternative ways of assessment and testing, which has always traditionally been known to use up vasts amount of paper. Assessment software refers to software with a primary purpose of assessing and testing students in a virtual environment.

More recently, numerous Large Language Model-based tools have also emerged to support educators by automating assessment and feedback processes.These tools are designed to help educators save time by providing structured feedback and grading suggestions for students’ text-based work. However, a study of a german equivalent of these tools, the ChatGPT-based "AI Grading Assistant" from the company Fobizz has found significant shortcomings with this LLM-based implementation. It reveals that the tool’s feedback and grading suggestions are often inconsistent, even with repeated submissions of the same text, suffering from randomness in grading and a lack of transparency in scoring mechanisms. Additionally, the tool fails to reliably detect nonsensical inputs, allowing flawed or AI-generated submissions to achieve high scores. Crucially, the authors note that many of these issues may be inherently tied to fundamental properties of LLMs, suggesting these deficiencies may translate to LLM-based grading tools more generally. Based on these findings, the authors emphasize the risks of over-reliance on AI as a “techno-fix” for systemic educational problems.

=== Reference software ===
Many publishers of print dictionaries and encyclopedias have been involved in the production of educational reference software since the mid-1990s. They were joined in the reference software market by both startup companies and established software publishers, most notably Microsoft.

The first commercial reference software products were reformulations of existing content into CD-ROM editions, often supplemented with new multimedia content, including compressed video and sound. More recent products made use of internet technologies, to supplement CD-ROM products, then, more recently, to replace them entirely.

Wikipedia and its offspins (such as Wiktionary) marked a new departure in educational reference software. Previously, encyclopedias and dictionaries had compiled their contents on the basis of invited and closed teams of specialists. The Wiki concept has allowed for the development of collaborative reference works through open cooperation incorporating experts and non-experts.

=== Corporate training and tertiary education ===
See also:

- Educational technology
- SCORM
- Virtual learning environment, LMS (learning management system)
- Training Management System
- Web-based training

=== Specific educational purposes ===
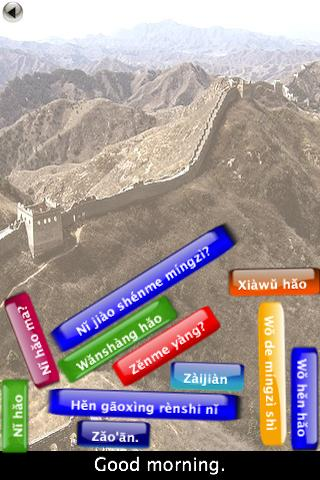
Educational software for learning Standard Chinese using Pinyin

There are highly specific niche markets for educational software, including:

- Designing and printing of card models for use in education – e.g. Designer Castles for BBC Micro and Acorn Archimedes platforms

=== Video games and gamification ===
Video games can be used to teach a user technology literacy or more about a subject. Some operating systems and mobile phones have these features. A notable example is Microsoft Solitaire, which was developed to familiarize users with the use of graphical user interfaces, especially the mouse and the drag-and-drop technique. Mavis Beacon Teaches Typing is a largely known program with built in mini-games to keep the user entertained while improving their typing skills.

Gamification is the use of game design elements in nongame contexts and has been shown to be effective in motivating behavior change. By seeing game elements as "motivational affordances," and formalizing the relationship between these elements and motivational affordances.

== Effects and use of educational software ==
=== Tutor-based software ===
Tutor-based education software is defined as software that mimics the teacher student one on one dynamic of tutoring with software in place of a teacher. Research was conducted to see if this type of software would be effective in improving students understanding of material. It concluded that there was a positive impact which decreased the amount of time students need to study for and relative gain of understanding.

=== Helping those with disabilities ===
A study was conducted to see the effects of education software on children with mild disabilities. The results were that the software was a positive impact assisting teaching these children social skills though team based learning and discussion, videos and games.

=== Education software evaluation ===
There is a large market of educational software in use today. A team decided that they were to develop a system in which educational software should be evaluated as there is no current standard. It is called the Construction of the Comprehensive Evaluation of Electronic Learning Tools and Educational Software (CEELTES). The software to be evaluated is graded on a point scale in four categories: the area of technical, technological and user attributes; area of criteria evaluating the information, content and operation of the software; the area of criteria evaluating the information in terms of educational use, learning and recognition; the area of criteria evaluating the psychological and pedagogical use of the software.

=== Use in higher education ===
In university level computer science course, learning logic is an essential part of the curriculum. There is a proposal on using two logistical education tool FOLST and LogicChess to understand First Order Logic for university students to better understand the course material and the essentials of logistical design.

== Selected reports and academic articles ==
- Virvou, M., Katsionis, G., & Manos, K. (2005). "Combining Software Games with Education: Evaluation of its Educational Effectiveness." Educational Technology & Society, 8 (2), 54-65.
- Seels, B. (1989). The instructional design movement in educational technology. Educational Technology, May, 11–15. https://web.archive.org/web/20080515073002/http://www.coe.uh.edu/courses/cuin6373/idhistory/1960.html
- Niemiec, R.P. & Walberg, H.T. (1989). From teaching machines to microcomputers: Some milestones in the history of computer-based instruction. Journal of Research on Computing in Education, 21(3), 263–276.
- Annetta, L., Minogue, J., Holmes, S., & Cheng, M. (2009). Investigation the impact of video games on high school students’ engagement and learning genetics. Computers and Education, 53, 74–85.
- Bainbridge, W. (2007). The scientific research potential of virtual worlds. Science, 317, 27, 471–476.
- Barab, S., Scott, B., Siyahhan, S., Goldstone, R., Ingram-Goble, A., Zuiker, S., & Warren, S. (2009).Transformational play as a curricular scaffold: Using videogames to support science education.. Journal of Science Education Technology, 18, 305–320.
- Bourgonjon, J., Valcke, M., Soetaert, R., & Schellens, T., (2010). Student's perceptions about the use of video games in the classroom. Computers and Education, 54, 1145–1156.
- Zhao, Y.; Zhang, G.; Lai, C. (2010-01-01), "Curriculum, Digital Resources and Delivery", in Peterson, Penelope; Baker, Eva; McGaw, Barry (eds.), International Encyclopedia of Education (3 ed.), Oxford: Elsevier, pp. 390–396, doi:10.1016/b978-0-08-044894-7.00063-4, ISBN 978-0-08-044894-7.

== See also ==
- Adaptive learning – Educational learning method using computer algorithms and AI
- Computer-assisted language learning – Learning technique
- Educational game – Game genre
- Educational technology – Use of technology in education to enhance learning and teaching
- Educational entertainment – Media designed to educate through entertainment Edutainment
- List of educational programming languages
- List of educational software
- List of free and open-source educational software
- List of online educational resources
- Instructional technology – Use of technology in education to enhance learning and teaching
- Typing software – Keyboard trainer program
