= Paper craft =

Making of artistic works entirely or primarily of paper

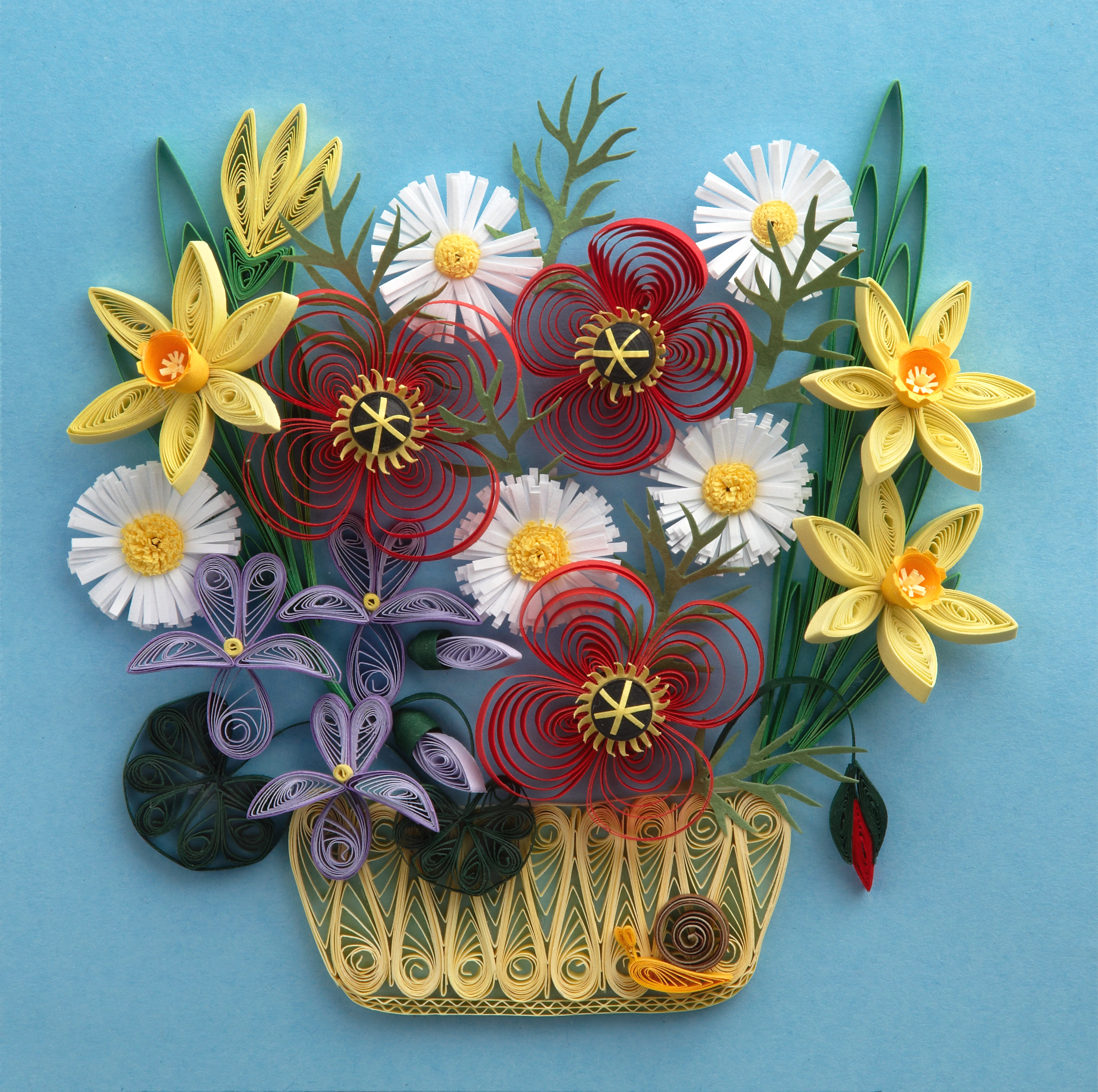
A quilled basket of flowers

Paper craft is a collection of crafts using paper or card as the primary artistic medium for the creation of two or three-dimensional objects. Paper and card stock lend themselves to a wide range of techniques and can be folded, curved, bent, cut, glued, molded, stitched, or layered. Papermaking by hand is also a paper craft.

== History ==
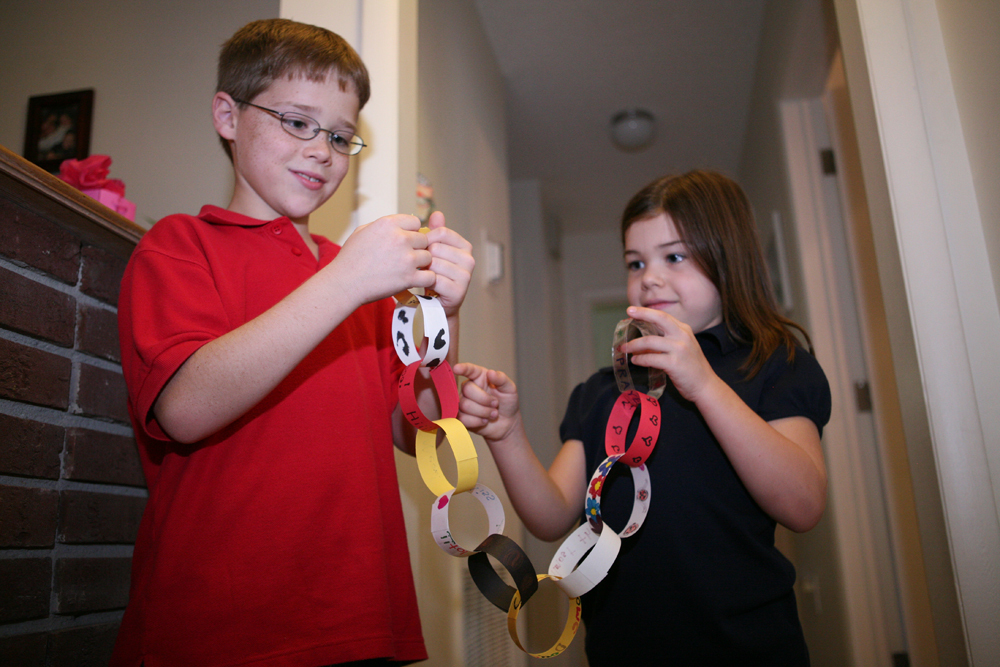
Two children making links of a paper chain

Paper crafts are known in most societies that use paper, with certain kinds of crafts being particularly associated with specific countries or cultures.

In addition to the aesthetic value of paper crafts, various forms of paper crafts are used in the education of children. Paper is a relatively inexpensive medium, readily available, and easier to work with than the more complicated media typically used in the creation of three-dimensional artwork, such as ceramics, wood, and metals. It is also neater to work with than paints, dyes, and other coloring materials. Paper crafts may also be used in therapeutic settings, providing children with a safe and uncomplicated creative outlet to express feelings.

== Folded paper ==
The word "paper" derives from papyrus, the name of the ancient material manufactured from beaten reeds in Egypt as far back as the third millennium B.C. Indeed, the earliest known example of "paper folding" is an ancient Egyptian map, drawn on papyrus and folded into rectangular forms like a modern road map. However, it does not appear that intricate paper folding as an art form became possible until the introduction of wood-pulp based paper.

Origami is also a folded paper art. The first Japanese origami is dated from the 6th century A.D. In much of the West, the term 'origami' is used synonymously with paper folding, though the term properly only refers to the art of paper folding in Japan. Other forms of paper folding include Chinese zhezhi (摺紙), Korean jong'i jeopgi (종이접기), and Western paper folding, such as the traditional paper boats and paper planes.

== Cut paper ==
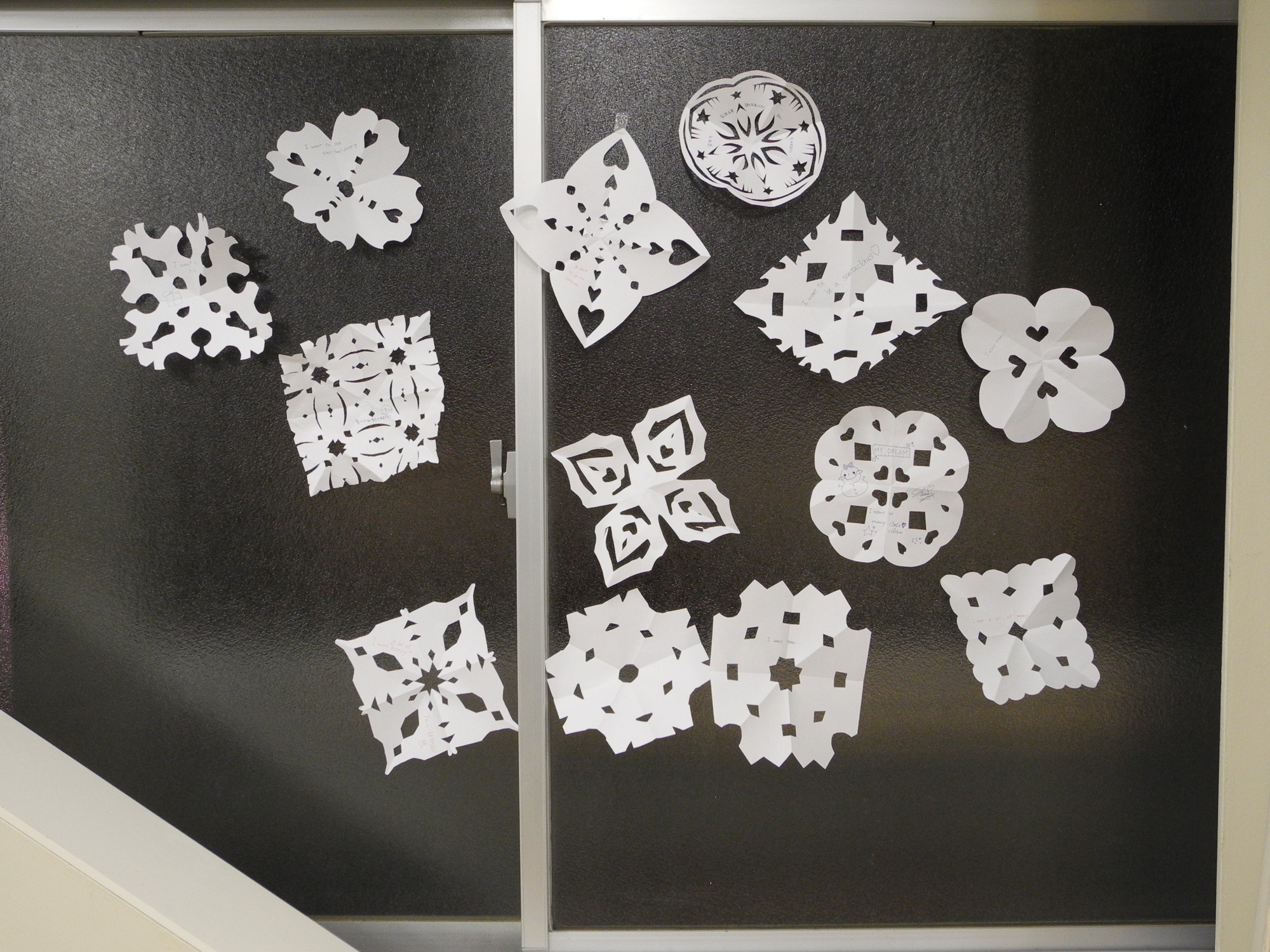
Paper snowflake designs

Papel picado, as practiced in Mexico and other places in Latin America is done using chisels to cut 50 to a hundred sheets at a time, while Chinese paper cutting uses knives or scissors for up to 8 sheets. Wycinanki and other European forms usually are done on one single sheet. In either of these traditions, paper sheets are folded prior to cutting to achieve symmetrical designs.

== Paper model ==
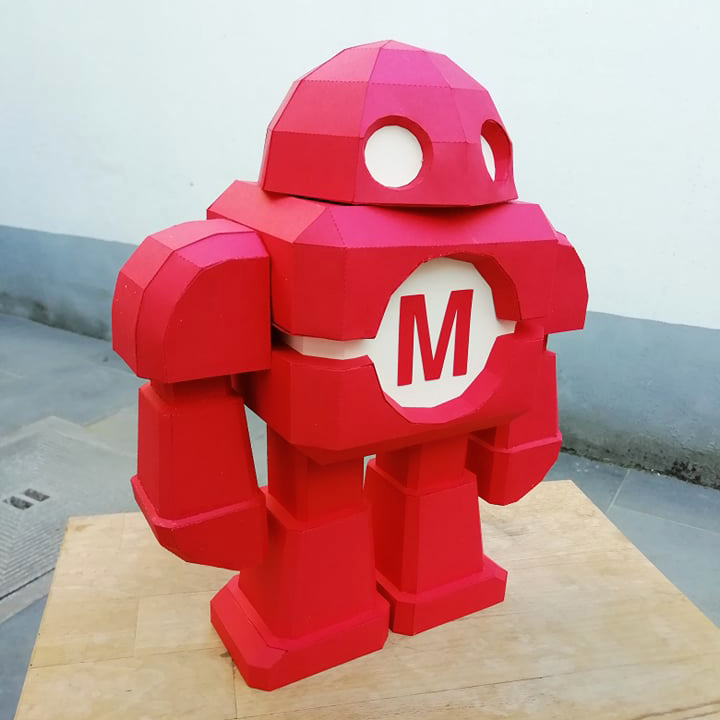
Papercraftplaza makerfair robot paper model

A technique in which you can recreate a 3D model. The polygons of a 3D mesh are unfolded to a printable pattern. With the help of glue tabs, cutting lines, mountain fold lines and valley fold lines the pattern comes together.

=== Free papercraft websites ===
The following websites provide free papercraft models, listed approximately from largest to smallest by the size of their collections. The notes indicate whether the models are hosted directly by the website and whether registration is required.

- Papercraftplaza — Self-hosted files; registration generally not required.
- Paper Replika — Self-hosted files; registration generally not required.
- Canon Creative Park — Self-hosted files; registration may be required depending on the service/region.
- Ninjatoes — Linked files from other websites; registration not required.
- Paper Diorama — Self-hosted files; registration generally not required.
- Yamaha Papercraft — Self-hosted files; registration not required.
- Paper Toys — Self-hosted files; registration generally not required.
- Brother Creative Center — Self-hosted files; registration may be required for some features or downloads.

== Paper pulp painting ==
Images built using colored paper pulp are a form of paper art that started in the 20th century. Chuck Close, Lynn Sures are among contemporary artist developing this medium. Paper pulp craft is widely used in rural India for making kitchen utility baskets.

== Types ==
- Scrapbooking
- Cardmaking
- Paper Flowers
- Decoupage
- Papier-mâché
- Origami
  - 3D Origami
- Origata
- Paper Cutting
- Quilling
- Paper Making
- Book Binding
- Paper Layering
- Paper Model
- Chinese paper folding
- Paper marbling

== See also ==
- Cartonería, a traditional handcraft in Mexico, of which piñatas are one of many examples
- Decorative arts
- Arts and crafts
- List of art media
- List of artistic media
- List of art techniques
- Multidimensional art
