= Origamic architecture =

Type of artform

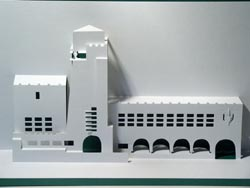
Louis Hartlooper Complex in Utrecht (The Netherlands)

Origamic architecture is a form of kirigami that involves the three-dimensional reproduction of architecture and monuments, on various scales, using cut-out and folded paper, usually thin paperboard. Visually, these creations are comparable to intricate 'pop-ups', indeed, some works are deliberately engineered to possess 'pop-up'-like properties. However, origamic architecture tends to be cut out of a single sheet of paper, whereas most pop-ups involve two or more. To create the three-dimensional image out of the two-dimensional surface requires skill akin to that of an architect.

== Origin ==
The development of origamic architecture began with Professor Masahiro Chatani's (then a newly appointed professor at the Tokyo Institute of Technology) experiments with designing original and unique greeting cards. Japanese culture encourages the giving and receiving of cards for various special occasions and holidays, particularly the Japanese New Year, and according to his own account, Professor Chatani personally felt that greeting cards were a significant form of connection and communication between people. He worried that in today's fast-paced modern world, the emotional connections called up and created by the exchange of greeting cards would become scarce.

In the early 1980s, Professor Chatani began to experiment with cutting and folding paper to make unique and interesting pop-up cards. He used the techniques of origami (Japanese paper folding) and kirigami (Japanese papercutting), as well as his experience in architectural design, to create intricate patterns that played with light and shadow. Many of his creations are made of stark white paper which emphasizes the shadowing effects of the cuts and folds. In the preface to one of his books, he called the shadows of the three-dimensional cutouts a "dreamy scene" that invited the viewer into a "fantasy world".

At first, Professor Chatani simply gave the cards to his friends and family. Over the next nearly thirty years, however, he published over fifty books on origamic architecture, many directed at children. He came to believe that origamic architecture could be a good way to teach architectural design and appreciation of architecture, as well as to inspire interest in mathematics, art, and design in young children.

Professor Chatani also spent a good deal of time travelling, even after his retirement, to exhibit his work. He frequently collaborated on books and exhibits with Keiko Nakazawa and Takaaki Kihara.

=== Masahiro Chatani ===
Masahiro Chatani was a Japanese architect (certified, first class) and professor considered to be the creator of origamic architecture. From its development until his death in 2008, he was widely acknowledged to be the world's foremost origamic architect.

Masahiro Chatani was born in Hiroshima, Japan in 1934. He grew up in Tokyo, and graduated from the Tokyo Institute of Technology in 1956. He became an assistant professor at the Tokyo Institute of Technology in 1969 and an associated assistant professor at Washington University in 1977, and was promoted to full professorship at the Tokyo Institute of Technology in 1980. It was around this time that he created what is now known as "origamic architecture". He became a professor emeritus fifteen years later, and continued to lecture at a number of institutions, including the Japan Architectural College, Hosei University, and the Shizuoka University of Art and Culture. After his retirement from active professorship, he continued to travel around the world, giving exhibits, demonstrations, and seminars on architectural design and origamic architecture.

Professor Chatani died on November 19, 2008, at the age of 74, from complications from laryngeal cancer.

== Types of origamic architecture ==
There are several different styles of origamic architecture. In one style, a folded paper is cut in such a way that when the paper is opened to form a 90-degree angle, a three-dimensional image can be created, similar to most pop-up books. A second style requires attaching a cut-out form to a base sheet of paper with thread.

Takaaki Kihara frequently uses another technique in which the three-dimensional structure is "punched out" of the flat card. Designs created with this technique allow the viewer to see the empty cutouts, which can create interesting shadowing effects. Kihara also points out that this style of origamic architecture is easier to store than the other 180-degree form, as the cut-out three-dimensional forms can be re-flattened with ease.

Less commonly, some designs require opening the paper and folding it completely in the opposite direction, making a 360-degree angle.

=== Uses in Architectural Design ===
Origamic architecture has become a tool many architects use to visualize the 2D as 3D in order to expand and explore on a design idea. 3D origami objects can be used in the interior design, i.e. for decorating walls. There are ways of doing origamic architecture using CAD (Computer-Aided-Design). CAD uses laser cuts to speed the cutting process along allowing for precise forms to be made. AI design programs still are in development, architects have been searching for solutions to their design struggles.

EPFL architects Hani Buri and Yves Weinand, researched ways to mass-produce "complex folded plate structures using origami architecture. Through different folding techniques like the Yoshimura pattern (an inverted diamond pattern), Miura Ori pattern (a repetition of reverse folds resulting in a diamond pattern), and the Diagonal pattern (series of parallelograms folded at a diagonal) - all were very successful due to their Origami diamond and herringbone patterns. As a result, Buri and Weinand were able to produce successful models and even a Chapel in Lausanne, Switzerland.

A study performed at the University of Pennsylvania in 2014, laid out the rules for folding and cutting a hexagonal lattice into a variety of three-dimensional shapes. Recent studies have explored the application of origamic architecture principles in designing deployable structures for emergency housing, highlighting their potential for rapid assembly and space efficiency.

== Leading practitioners ==
Although origamic architecture was developed and first gained popularity in Japan, it is today practiced in countries all over the world.

Some leading practitioners include Masahiro Chatani (Japan), Keiko Nakazawa (Japan), Takaaki Kihara (Japan), Ingrid Siliakus (Netherlands), María Victoria Garrido (Argentina), Giovanni Russo (Italy) and Marc Hagan-Guirey (UK).

== See also ==
- Origami
- Kirigami
- Paper Folding
- Papercutting
- Parallelogram
- Architectural model
