= Designer Castles =

Designer Castles was a software title for the BBC Micro and later Acorn Archimedes (RISC OS based) range of computers.

The software produced by Data Design in Barnsley, England, UK allowed its users to design a medieval style- castle by means of a WIMP based design environment. In the design environment a number of pre-defined components, (For example, towers, walls and keeps) could be linked and manipulated to form a castle design. The components of the castle could then be printed (along with wall elevations and plans) so that a card model of the designed castle could be assembled.

The paper, glue and model making tools required for assembly were not supplied with any version of the package, although assembly instructions for components were provided in the extensive manual.

== BBC Micro version ==
Designer Castles was first released in 1988 for BBC B/Master 128. The WIMP environment supported keyboard input and also allowed use of the mouse (such as AMX Mouse). The package consisted of a software disc together with a ring bound manual and ROM cartridge containing WIMP and dot-matrix printer support routines. Data Design targeted with the application educational market. Review in BBC Acorn User magazine praised features of Designer Castles, but criticized its high price.

The support ROM was named the PRINTWARE Support ROM. The term PRINTWARE was created by Peter Downs as a trade mark to cover the concept of software that was developed to enable designs to be sent to printers as 'nets' that could be cut out and folded to construct models.

== Acorn Archimedes (RISC OS) version ==
A version of Designer Castles was released in 1991 for the Acorn Archimedes systems using RISC OS. Unlike the BBC Micro version, the program utilizes the existing RISC OS Wimp environment and printer routines without need for a separate support module. Archimedes release also introduced several enhancements of the user interface (colourful environment instead of black and white), on the other hand it was no longer possible to print small simplified view of the castle like in the BBC Micro version.

== Additional spin-off titles ==
As well as Castles, the design environment was later adapted in a separate software title "Medieval Villages" to allow construction of medieval villages. Castle designs could be added to designs produced by this program.

A second additional title "Designer Environment" utilized the design environment for modern buildings, although it was not possible to add Castle designs to "villages" created with this software.

Data Design also released "Designer Logic" for drawing of logic gates.

== The people behind Designer Castles ==
The Designer Castles idea was the brainchild of Peter Downs and the late Keith Swift. The original idea was to develop a "design, print, cut-out and assemble gymkhana". since both Peter and Keith had daughters it seemed a great idea, when they presented the idea to a commercial software company they were told that girls didn't use computers nearly as much as boys and, if they were to develop a similar product for boys, then the firm would be interested in discussing it further. So they set to work, and designed the first (never released) version of Designer Castles, when they presented this, the commercial company was highly critical. Peter and Keith set up Data Design, brought on board R Fry as programmer and Vic Wright (primarily to write the content of the exceptional manual) which Peter then produced. The business recruited Carol Duffy who was massively responsible for working with the key publications and writers (such as Chris Drage and Nick Evans), to create a tremendous amount of publicity leading to the software becoming one of the best selling educational software products in its time.

== Current situation ==
As of 2006 there have been no attempts to revive the program for modern PC systems, despite the porting of other programs originally Acorn based, such as BBC Basic and Tabs.
