= Paper model =

Models constructed from paper

Example of a cat papercraft

Paper models, also called card models or papercraft, are models constructed mainly from sheets of heavy paper, paperboard, card stock, or foam.

== Details ==
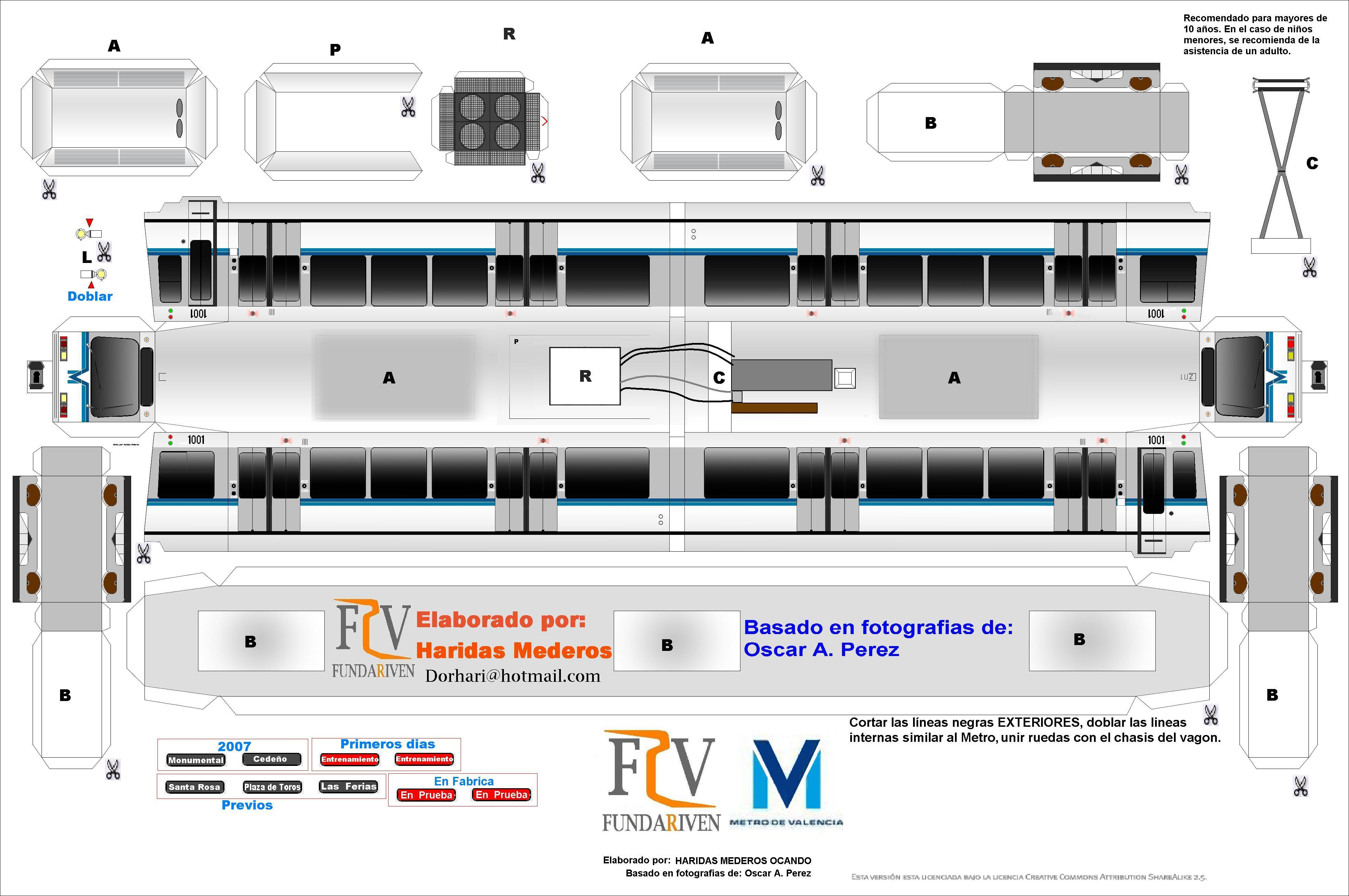
Printable sheet to make a metro train of the Valencia Metro (Venezuela)

Printable PDF file to make Clock Tower

Printable PDF file to make Bank of China Tower

This may be considered a broad category that contains origami and card modeling. Origami is the process of making a paper model by folding a single piece of paper without using glue or cutting while the variation kirigami does. Card modeling is making scale models from sheets of cardstock on which the parts were printed, usually in full color. These pieces would be cut out, folded, scored, and glued together. Papercraft is the art of building these models and often the further combination to build more complex creations/models.

Sometimes the model pieces can be punched out, although it is more common to cut the printed parts out. The edges of the paper may be scored to aid folding. The parts are usually glued together with PVA glue. In this kind of modeling, the sections are usually pre-painted, although some enthusiasts may enhance the model by further painting and detailing. Given the fact that they are made of paper, the model may be sealed with varnish or filled with spray foam to last longer. Some enthusiasts also make life-sized props by making the craft and covering it with resin and then painting them. Another popular technique is making the craft out of photographic paper and laminating it via heat, thus preventing the colour on the printed side from wearing out. Paper crafts can be used as references to make props out of other materials too.

Paper model artists often create simple designs as a form of recreation and creative expression. These models may include basic geometric shapes, vehicles, buildings, animals, or simple characters that can be assembled with minimal tools and materials. The process is generally similar to the more complex props but usually involve less folds/paper pieces/emphasis on the craft's preservation.

== History ==
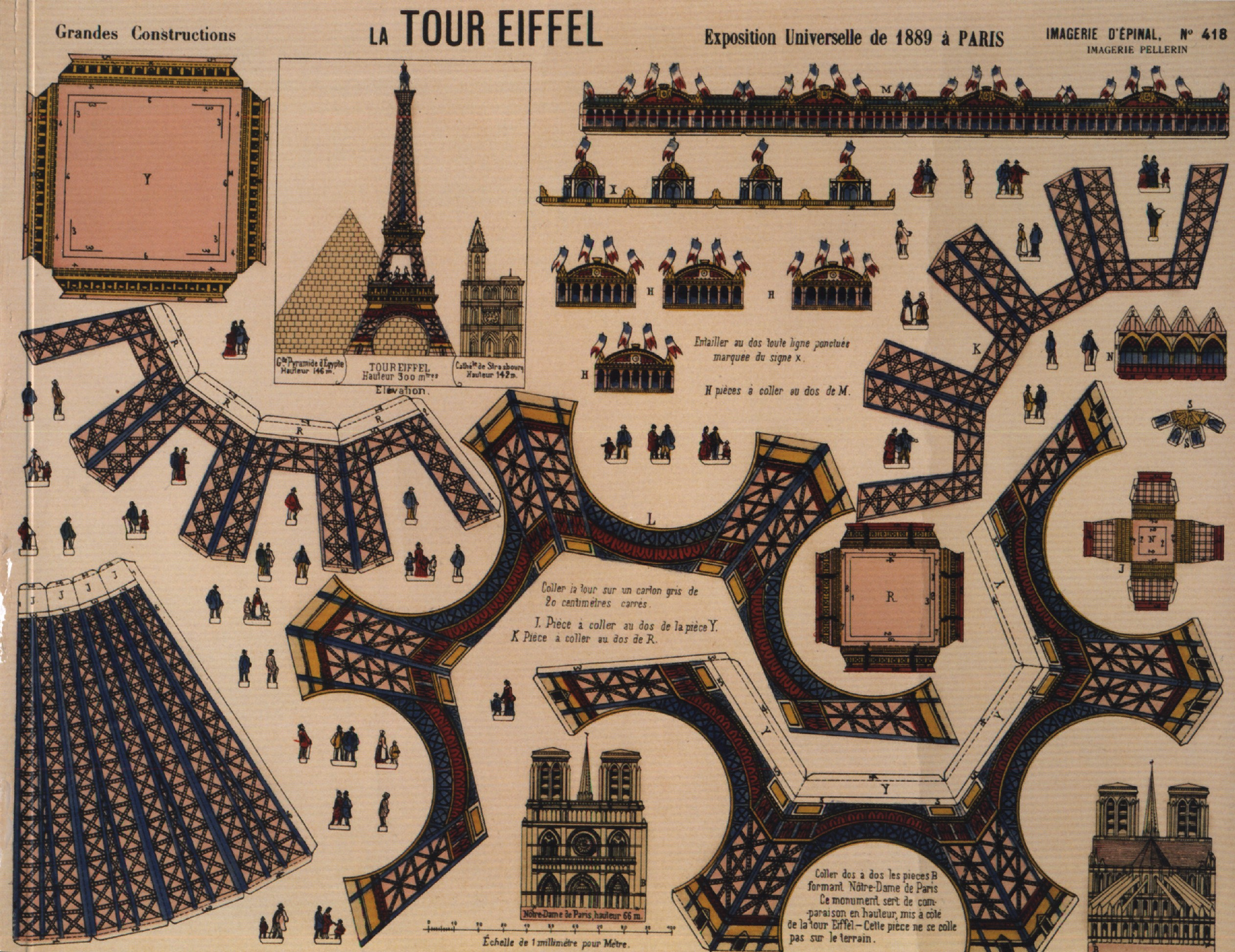
Eiffel Tower model

The first paper models appeared in Europe in the 17th century with the earliest commercial models were appearing in French toy catalogs in 1800. Printed card became common in magazines in the early part of the 20th century. The popularity of card modeling boomed during World War II when the paper was one of the few items whose use and production was not heavily regulated.

Micromodels, designed and published in England from 1941 were very popular with 100 different models, including architecture, ships, and aircraft. But as plastic model kits became more commonly available, interest in paper decreased.

== Availability ==
The Robert Freidus Collection, held at the V&A Museum of Childhood, has over 14000 card models exclusively in the category Architectural Paper Models. Since paper model patterns can be easily printed and assembled, the Internet has become a popular means of exchanging them. Commercial corporations have recently begun using downloadable paper models for their marketing (examples are Yamaha and Canon).

The availability of numerous models on the Internet at little or no cost, which can then be downloaded and printed on inexpensive inkjet printers has caused its popularity again to increase worldwide. Home printing also allows models to be scaled up or down easily (for example, in order to make two models from different authors, in different scales, match each other in size), although the paper weight might need to be adjusted in the same ratio.

Inexpensive kits are available from dedicated publishers (mostly based in Eastern Europe; examples include Halinski, JSC Models, and Maly Modelarz), a portion of the catalog of which date back to 1950.

Experienced hobbyists often scratchbuild models, either by first hand drawing or using software such as Adobe Illustrator and Inkscape. An historical example of highly specialized software is Designer Castles for BBC Micro and Acorn Archimedes platforms, which was developed as a tool for creation of card model castles. CAD and CG software, such as Rhino 3D, 3DS Max, Blender, and specialist software, like Pepakura Designer from Tama Software, Dunreeb Cutout or Ultimate Papercraft 3D, may be employed to convert 3D computer models into two-dimensional printable templates for assembly.

=== 3D models to paper ===
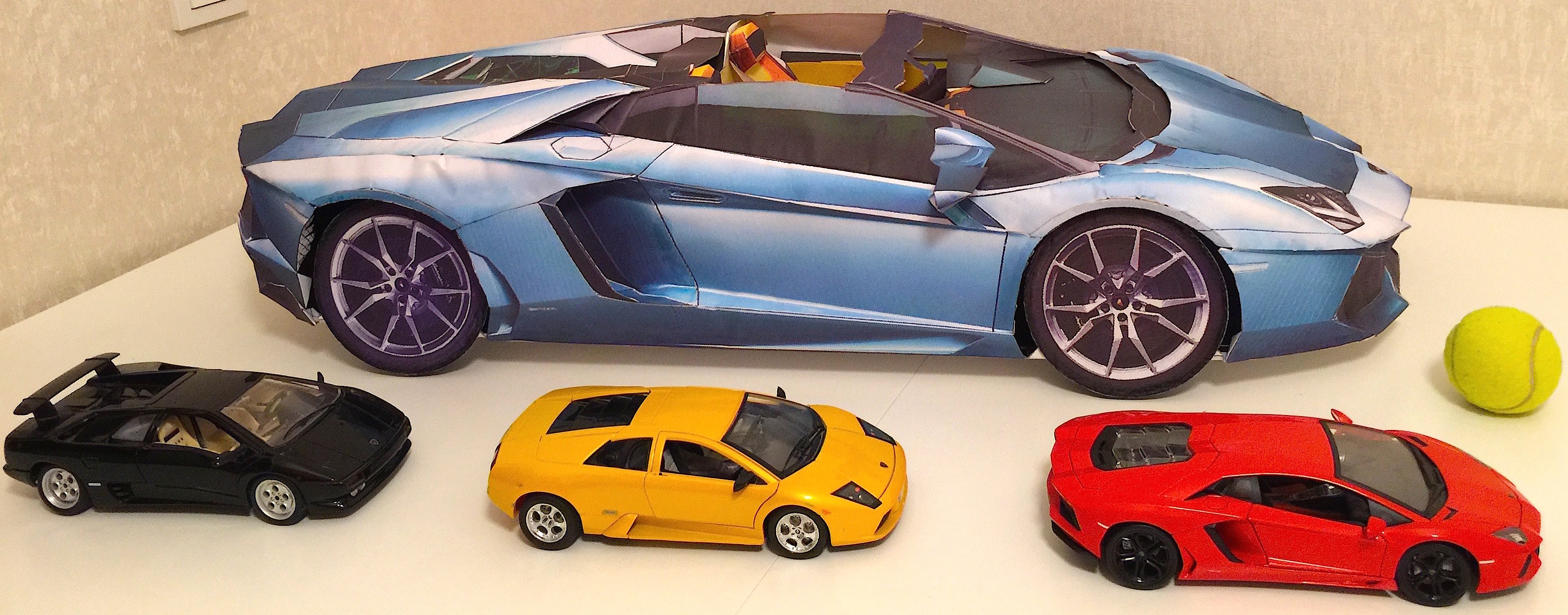
Paper model made from 4 photos

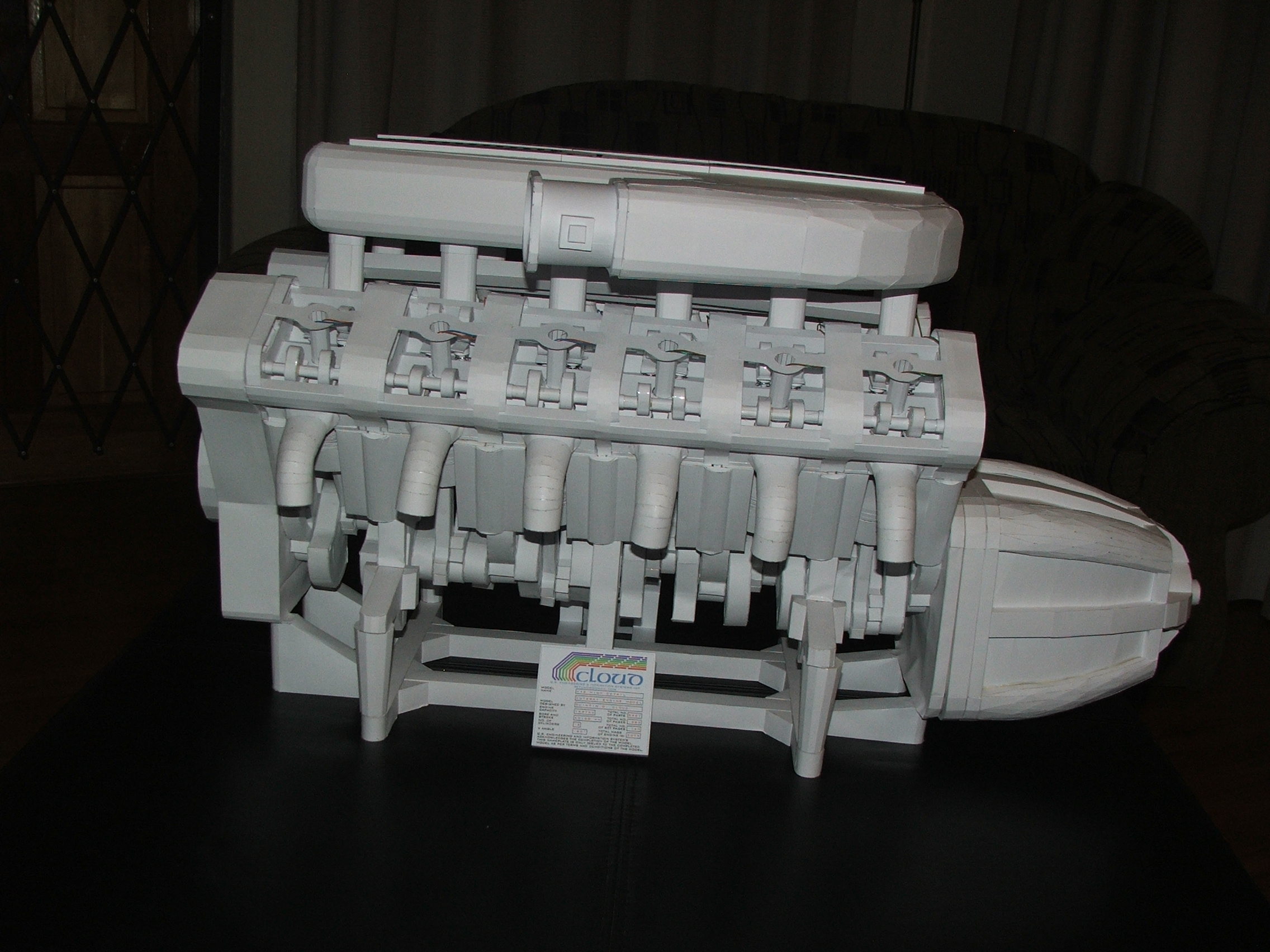
Model of a V12 engine

The use of 3D models greatly assists in the construction of paper models, with video game models being the most prevalent source. Various methods of extracting the digital model exist, including using a model viewer and exporting it into a workable file type, or capturing the model from the emulation directly. If the model cannot be extracted directly from the source, the designer may have to arrange the textures and the wireframe model in a 3D program, such as SketchUp, 3DS MAX, Metasequoia, or Blender, before exporting it to a papercraft creating program, such as Dunreeb Cutout or Pepakura Designer by Tama Software. From there the model is typically refined to give a proper layout and construction tabs that will affect the overall appearance and difficulty in constructing the model.

== Subjects ==
Paper model of Mount Vernon

Because people can create their own patterns, paper models are limited only by their designers' imaginations and ability to manipulate paper into forms. Vehicles are a frequent subject of paper models, some using photo-realistic textures from their real-life counterparts for extremely fine details. Architecture models can be very simple and crude forms to very detailed models with thousands of pieces to assemble. Architectural paper models are popular with model railway enthusiasts.

Various models are used in tabletop gaming, primarily wargaming. Scale paper models allow for easy production of armies and buildings for use in gaming. Players are able to personalize the models to bear unique unit designations and insignias for gaming.

== See also ==
- Net
- Cardboard modeling
- Paper Aeroplane
- Origamic architecture
- Superquick
- Leo Monahan
- Toy theater – Small stage for imitating or testing full-scale productions
- Omocha-e
