= Superquick =

Superquick Models is the brand of a series of printed card kit buildings used mainly for model railways. Manufacturing takes place entirely in the United Kingdom.

There are several ranges of model kit - railway buildings in Series A; houses, farm buildings and industrial buildings in Series B; houses and shops in low relief (to line the backs of layouts) in series C and brick and stone textured paper in series D. Superquick models are equally suitable for the model railway scales of both OO (1:76) and HO (1:87).

The Superquick Model range was launched in 1960 by Donovan Lloyd, who was born in 1914, trained as an artist and illustrator in the late 1930s and died in 2009.

Mostly the buildings are modelled in the architectural vernacular of the 1930s British suburbs and provinces. Although likely prototypes of some of the models can be identified, there is no serious attempt to reproduce particular buildings. It was considered more important to provide full value from the materials of the kit than to model any details exactly. The industrial logic of print requires volume production, which means that the models must appeal to a wide audience rather than to specialist modellers.

The main selling features of printed kits are that they are inexpensive compared to moulded plastic kits and that the plastic kit manufacturers have not yet been able to achieve the exact surface detail to be had from print. Superquick uses specialist print techniques to heighten the models' realism in the context of the model railway layout. In Great Britain in 1960 this special printing and the practices of printing on fine paper, mounting the paper on card and die-cutting the result (to save the modeller from cutting the components himself) gave Superquick a great advantage over other makers of card kits; the other ranges from that time are selling at low volumes or now extinct. From the beginning, through being deliberately printed in volume, Superquick has always been competitively priced.

Many modellers have considerable fondness for the kits, because in the period 1960 to 1995 they were the obvious choice for the first buildings on their layout. That being so and as sales of Superquick rocketed in the late 1960s, there was criticism of the kits by leading modellers for whom "Superquick kits were a particular cliché and the Superquick low-relief buildings eventually came to blight any layout on which they appeared".

When the range was launched, there were several formats and scales. Whereas now the pack is virtually standardised at 320 mm × 200 mm, there were square packs 200 mm × 200 mm and at least one pack 280 mm × 200 mm. There were kits in the British TT scale (1:100) and kits in the MR series to go with the Scalextric slot-car track (1:32).

The TT scale kits were the first to be discontinued, in the late 1970s. These are now highly prized by collectors, and fetch large sums when unmade kits become available. Peter Denny's son made a complete set of the buildings for his 3 mm layout, pictures of which appear in Peter Denny's Buckingham Great Central: 25 Years of Railway Modelling.

Some of the current range are kits which were newly designed in the 1970s. These replaced discontinued kits but kept alive their model numbers. The discontinued kits still appear on eBay and at other outlets from time to time.

The only kit to be discontinued and not replaced was C3 "Low Relief Modern Shops & Flat" which made its last appearance in the 1985 catalogue . Mr Lloyd never admitted it, but others believed he terminated the kit prematurely for being too ugly.

The firm PEMS Butler Ltd, whose subordinate company had been the dedicated exporter of the range, took over the range in 1992 and extended it with additional railway, village and industrial buildings whilst adhering to the original design style and commercial policy. Reflecting family generational succession, the ownership moved in June 2016 to the firm Brickwall Works Ltd.

It was commercial policy to supply the kits directly to model shops and other retailers, a factor in keeping the retail price low. However, with effect from January 2011, this policy was changed so that supply was effected through dedicated model hobby distributors. As a result of this and the coincidental rise in the VAT rate, retail prices were noticeably increased. They remain competitive.

Superquick faced criticism for the rationalisation of the kits carried out by Donovan Lloyd in the 1970s. The original series included buildings found in many market towns around the UK, with the exception of the 1960s supermarket, and the modern low relief set (C3): indeed in original reviews, the Georgian Bank, and Elizabethan Cottages were noted as being very "twee".

However the changes in the 1970s introduced buildings that were much squarer, and plainer. In particular the loss of the old B28 Elizabethan Cottage, which had been profitably marketed by a Californian retailer as "Anne Hathaway’s Cottage", was much regretted. The new B28 pair of Elizabethan cottages was a lot more "twee" than ever the original had been.

There has been criticism that the kits issued after the change of ownership in 1992 included buildings that really were not suitable for the majority of model railways, which were based on the branch lines. Still the earlier kits are all available as ever and no significant branch line subjects remain to be modelled in the range. While it is true that the Coaling Tower and the Ash Plant would be mainline features and would tend to tower over most model layouts, critics would be (and the company has been) surprised to learn that sales of these new kits have proved better than at least one of the staple railway kits.

Superquick gained some exposure from the title sequence of the UK TV Series "Homes Under the Hammer" where all 13 series ran a sequence showing a selection of the vernacular Superquick buildings, with some minor changes to add chimneys covered with UK currency. A large quantity of the superquick buildings were also built for episode 6 of James May's Toy Stories.

A number of Superquick models are destroyed in a scene in the film The Life and Death of Peter Sellers, where Sellers stamps on them in retribution for his son having "fixed" a paint blemish on Sellers's Bentley by painting a "go faster stripe" on the side.

The Railway Terminus Building appears at the start of Landscapes music video ‘Einsteins a go go’.

== Superquick model kits ==
Series MR MOTOR RACING (1/32 SCALE)

MR1 Racing Pits
MR2 Control Tower
MR3 Marshal's Hut
MR4 Dunlop Bridge (thought to only exist as a preproduction model)

Series TT RAILWAY SERIES (3 mm)

1960 Originals, all discontinued probably in the 1970s

No1 Platform
No2 Station
No3 Signal Box
No4 Goods Shed

Series A RAILWAY SERIES (4 mm)

1960 Originals

A1 Platform, single sided
A2 Country Station (old style)
A3 Island Platform
A4 Island Platform Building (old style)
A5 Locoshed (a double kit)
A6 Signalbox + Platelayers Hut
A7 Goodshed (old style)
A8 Watertower & red Weigh-house
A9 4 Terraced Houses

Second edition

A1 Platform (unchanged from first edition)
A2 Country Station (new style)
A3 Island Platform
A4 Island Platform Building (new style)
A5 Locoshed (unchanged from first edition)
A6 Signalbox + Coal hut (from 1987)
A7 Goods Shed (new style, with new island platform). Re-numbered A7.0 with introduction of a stone built goods shed in 2022.
A8 Watertower & white Weigh-house (new style)
A9 Footbridge (new in 1990)
A10 Railway Terminus (the largest kit, unchanged from 1960 to present)

1992 (change of ownership) all the above, plus

A11 Station Masters House & Crossing Keepers Cottage
A12 Coal Tower (a double kit)
A13 Ashplant
A14 Red Brick Bridge/Tunnel Entrances (new in 2013)
A15 Blue Brick Bridge/Tunnel Entrances (new in 2013)
A16 Stone Bridge/Tunnel Entrances (new in 2013)
A7.1 Goods Shed (stone built goods shed new in 2022)

Series B COUNTRY TOWN SERIES (4 mm)

1960 Originals

B21 The Railway Arms (twin fronts, large Courage Ales sign)
B22 Two country town shops (one Elizabethan: Originally one building, separated into two in 1970)
B23 Country Bank (Georgian, large Barclays sign)
B24 Greystones Farmhouse (old style, L-shaped)
B25 Police Station (Georgian, with garage on right)
B26 Farm Hayloft (old style, matching Greystones)
B27 Modern Supermarket (discontinued by 1976)
B28 Elizabethan Cottages (one long row of a rather random building)
B29 Church (unchanged from 1960 to present)
B30 4 Terraced Houses (old style)

1980 Editions

B21 Swan Inn (new style with a tall hotel, and smaller off licence)
B22 Two Country Town Shops (new squarer style)
B23 Two Detached Houses (1930s style)
B24 Greystones Farmhouse (new squarer style)
B25 Police Station or Library (new grander style)
B26 Farm Hayloft & Barn (new style to match Greystones farmhouse)
B27 Supermarket & Shop (similar in style to the detached houses)
B28 Two Elizabethan Cottages (new in 1987, similar in style to the detached houses)
B30 4 Terraced Cottages (new in 1987)
B31 Village School (new in 1991)

1992 onwards (change of ownership) all the above, plus

B32 Country Garage & Petrol Pump
B33 Railway Hotel
B34 Bus Depot (a double kit)
B35 Market House
B36 Country Fire Station

Series C LOW RELIEF HOUSES (4 mm)

1963 Originals

C1 Hotel, Offices, Restaurant
C2 Cinema, Post Office, Shop
C3 Modern shops & flats (discontinued in the late 80's)
C4 Regency Period Shops and House

1992 onwards (change of ownership) all the above, plus

C5 4 Redbrick Terrace Backs
C6 4 Redbrick Terrace Fronts
C7 Double Redbrick Terrace Corner Shop
