= Dolly Dimples =

Dolly Dimples can have several meanings:

- Dolly Dimples (comic strip), former syndicated newspaper comic strip character created by Grace Drayton
- Dolly Dimples (Utah), 1909 publicity stunt in Salt Lake City
- "Dolly Dimples", traditional name for large ladies who once made their living with freak shows at circuses and carnivals
- "Dolly Dimples", stage name of performer Celesta Geyer (née Herrmann)
- Dolli Dimples, Chuck E. Cheese animatronic
- "Dolly Dimples", a 1927 piano composition by American composer Louis Alter
