= Dimple (disambiguation) =

A dimple is a facial feature.

Dimple or Dimples may also refer to:

== Arts and entertainment ==
=== Fictional characters ===
- Darla Dimple, the main villainess in the 1997 animated film Cats Don't Dance
- the title character of the early American comic strip Dolly Dimples
- Dolly Dimples (Utah), in a 1909 publicity stunt
- a title character in Cuddles and Dimples, a British comic strip published in the UK comic book magazine The Dandy

=== Films ===
- Dimples (1916 film), starring Mary Miles Minter
- Dimples (1936 film), starring Shirley Temple

=== Music ===
- "Dimples" (song), by John Lee Hooker
- "Dimple", a song on the EP Love Yourself: Her by South Korean boy band BTS
- The Dimples, a backing trio of singers for American R&B singer Eddie Cooley

=== Video games ===
- Dimple Entertainment, a former Japanese video game development and publishing company

== People ==
=== Given name ===
- Dimple Ajmera, American 21st century politician
- Dimple Bhagat (born 1998), Indian male footballer
- Dimple Chopade (born 1985), Indian film actress
- Dimple Hayathi (born 1998), Indian film actress
- Dimple Jhangiani (born 1988), Indian television actress
- Dimple Kapadia (born 1957), Indian Bollywood actress
- Dimple Mastura (born 1990), Filipino politician
- Dimple Thapa, Bhutanese politician and Minister of Education and Skills Development from 2024
- Dimple Yadav (born 1978), Indian politician

=== Nickname or stage name ===
- Elizabeth Cooper (1914–1960), stage name Dimples, Scottish-Filipina film actress, vaudeville dancer and singer, mistress of General Douglas MacArthur
- Richard "Dimples" Fields (1942–2000), American R&B and soul singer
- Dimples D. (fl. 1983–1991), stage name of American rapper Crystal Smith
- Dimples Romana, stage name of Filipino actress Dianne Ahmee (born 1984)
- "Dolly Dimples", a stage name of circus fat lady Celesta Geyer (1901–1982)

== Places ==
- Dimple, Kentucky, United States, an unincorporated community
- Dimple Creek, Pennsylvania, United States
- Dimple, an area of the town of Matlock, Derbyshire, England

== Other uses ==
- one of the indentations on a golf ball
- Haig (whisky), a brand of Scotch whisky also known as Dimple
