= Tom Tierney (artist) =

Tom Tierney (October 8, 1928 – July 12, 2014) was a noted American paper doll artist. He is credited with reviving what has been described by The New York Times as the "lost art" of paper doll making during his career which stretched from the 1970s to his death in 2014. Over the course of his career, he sold over 4 million paper dolls and 400 paper doll books to readers all over the world, including one to Pope John Paul II.

== Early life and education ==
Tierney was born on October 8, 1928, in Beaumont, Texas. He began his art education at an early age, studying life drawing, landscapes, and still-life painting. Tierney began freelance fashion illustration while in high school for local department stores in his home town. He graduated from Beaumont High School in 1945. He attended Lamar Junior College from 1945 to 1946 and completed his education at the University of Texas, graduating in 1949 with a Bachelor of Fine Arts in painting and sculpture. He received a fellowship to attend the Colorado Springs Fine Arts Center school where he studied frescoes. Upon graduating, he became a fashion illustrator for Scarborough's department store and later, Goodfriend's specialty shop in Austin.

== Career ==
In 1951 he entered the United States Army, serving until 1953, as a recruiting artist. After serving in the Army, Tom moved to New York where he continued his career as a fashion illustrator and as a freelance artist. In addition to fashion illustration for large department stores such as JCPenney's, Macy's, and Sear's, Tierney has also illustrated a number of film posters for the Shorlane Bennet Agency, painted a number of portrait commissions, and did some nightclub singing in the Upstairs at the Duplex in Greenwich Village amongst other things. His first paper doll book, Thirty from the 30s, was published by Prentice-Hall in 1976, and its success subsequently led to the publishing of over 350 paper doll books, as well as a number of self-published works. Besides his paper dolls, Tierney also illustrated children's books, numerous Barbie and Jem books, and an array of commercial art.

== Awards and honours ==
- The Nancy Beeman Strong Art Scholarship Award (1945)
- The Veesy Rainwater Painting Scholarship Award (1945)
- Texas Fellowship Painting Award (1948)

== Death ==
Tierney died on July 12, 2014, at the age of 85 of lung cancer in Smithville, Texas. He had a Paper Doll Shop for many years on Main Street in downtown Smithville after leaving New York. His shop was downstairs while Mr. Tierney, known around town as "Tom", lived in his upstairs apartment. He autographed all of his many Paper Doll Books which he sold until his death. His relatives kept the store open in memory of him until his supply of vintage-style paper ornaments and books sold out.

== See also ==
- Margaret G. Hays - Another prominent paper doll artist
- Grace Drayton - Another prominent paper doll artist, who cooperated extensively with her sister Margaret (shown above, in the See Also section)
