= Bulls and bears =

Bulls and bears may refer to:

- Market sentiment, which can be bullish or bearish
- Bull and bear markets
- Bulls and Bears: The Great Wall St. Game, a board game by McLoughlin Brothers
