= Paper folding (disambiguation) =

Paper folding usually refers to the Japanese art of origami.

Paper folding may also refer to:

- Chinese paper folding, the art of paper folding that originated in medieval China
- Paper model, a model constructed mainly from sheets of heavy paper, paperboard, card stock, or foam
- Paper toys, toys constructed by folding, cutting, decorating, or assembling pieces of paper
- Mathematics of paper folding
  - Geometric Exercises in Paper Folding, an 1893 book by T. Sundara Row
- Pop-up book, any book with three-dimensional pages
- Regular paperfolding sequence, an infinite sequence of 0s and 1s
- Book folding, the stage of the book production process in which the pages of the book are folded
- Hotel toilet paper folding, a common practice performed by hotels as a way of assuring guests that the bathroom has been cleaned
