= Paper doll =

2D figure made from paper or thin card

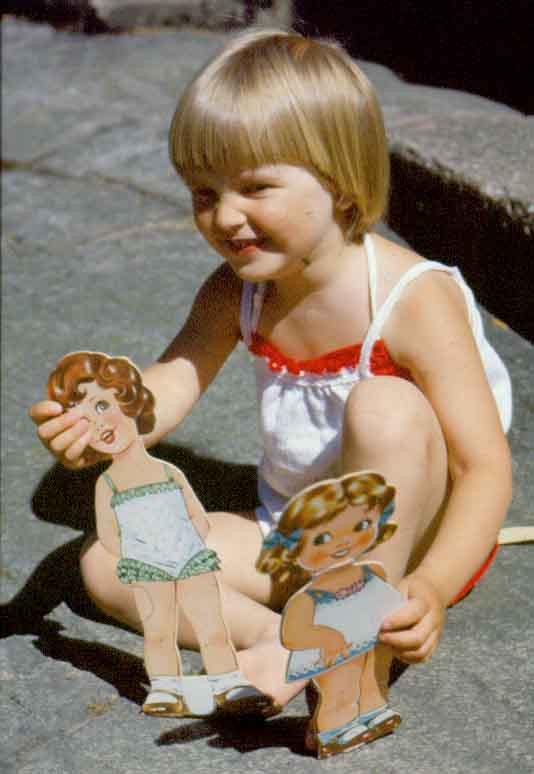
A girl playing with paper dolls

Paper dolls are figures cut out of paper or thin card with separate clothes, also made of paper, that are usually held onto the dolls by paper folding tabs. They may be a figure of a person, animal or inanimate object.

Paper dolls have been used for advertising, appearing in magazines and newspapers, and covering a variety of subjects and time periods. Over the years, they have been used to reinforce cultural beliefs regarding the appearance of ideal women.

Some flat plastic figures are similar to paper dolls, like Colorforms figures and Flatsy dolls, but these are imitations and not considered characteristic of the paper doll art form.

== History ==
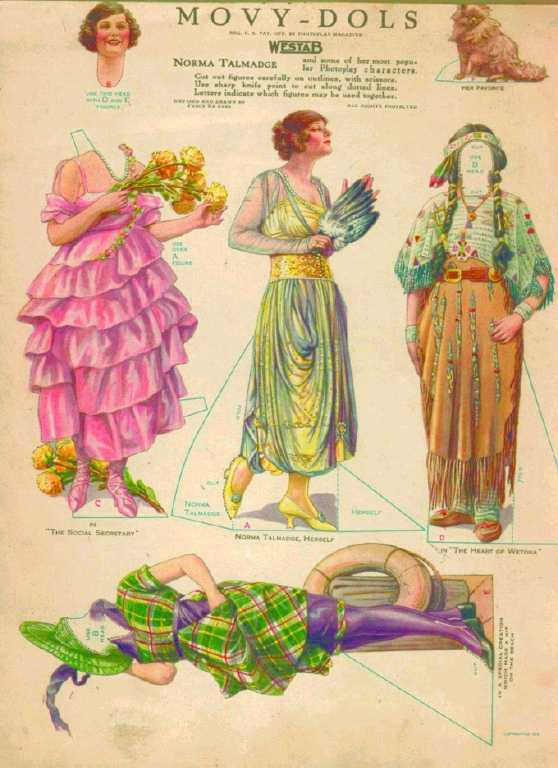
1919 magazine illustration of actress Norma Talmadge and some of her film costumes in paper doll form

Paper dolls have been around as long as there has been paper, perhaps hundreds or even thousands of years by some estimates. Faces or other objects were applied to the paper and used during religious rituals and ceremonies in Asian cultures many centuries ago. The Japanese used paper for origami, the art of paper folding, and dating back to 800 AD they folded paper figurines in the shape of kimono. Balinese people made paper and leather into puppets since before the Christian Era. Other cultures around the world have had paper formations or paper art, including in Poland, where they were called Wycinanki. These early types of paper figures differ from typical modern paper dolls, as no clothes were made to be used with the dolls.

The first manufactured paper doll was “Little Fanny”, produced by S&J Fuller, London, in 1810. In Europe, particularly France, the first paper dolls were popular since the mid-18th century. The oldest known paper doll card is hosted by Germanisches Nationalmuseum and was printed around 1650 in Southern Germany, showing two female figures with a number of dresses, pieces of headgear, hairstyles and accessories. The paper was jointed and called pantins, meaning dancing or jumping jack puppet. They were intended to entertain adults and spread throughout high society. They were drawn or painted like people with fashions for each doll. These were more similar to contemporary Western paper dolls. Rare hand-painted sets of paper figures dating to the late 1780s can be found in some museums.

"The History and Adventures of Little Henry", by J. Belcher was the first American toy that included paper dolls. Published in 1812, this book prompted children to act out various scenes with the paper dolls that were included.

The biggest American producer of paper dolls, McLoughlin Brothers, were founded in early 1800 and sold to Milton Bradley in the 1920s. Around this time paper dolls became popular in the US and then grew in popularity in the following decades. The rise of paper doll production in the mid-19th century to mid-20th century was partially due to technological advances that made printing significantly less expensive.

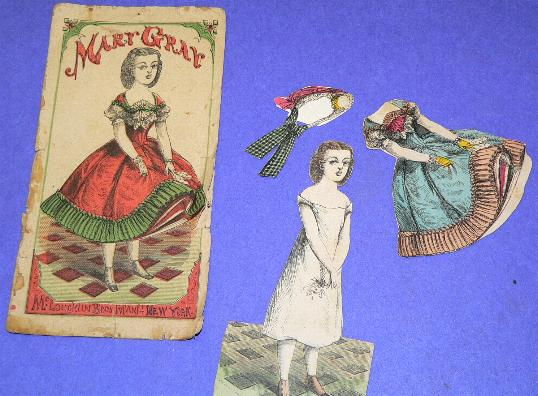
Paper doll with clothes

Book publishing companies that followed in the production of paper dolls or cut-outs were Lowe, Whitman, Saalfield and Merrill among others. Movie stars and celebrities became the focus in the early days of paper dolls in the USA. Paper dolls are still produced and Whitman and Golden Co. still publish paper dolls.

Other than movie stars, women of leisure tended to be the ones featured in paper doll form. As more women began to enter the work force in the twentieth-century, paper doll manufacturers began to produce dolls that represented career women. The women's rights movement in mid-20th century was partially responsible for instigating this change. Brides were another common figure often represented in paper doll form.

== Convention ==
A paper doll convention has been held every year in the United States since 1979, with two being held in 1980, 1981, and 1982. In 2016, one was held in Phoenix, Arizona.

== See also ==
- Jumping jack (toy)
- Margaret G. Hays (1874-1925) - most famous American female paper doll manufacturer
- Grace Drayton (1877-1936) - second most famous female American paper doll maker, sister of Margaret and apprentice to Tom Tierney
- Tom Tierney (1928-2014) - The reputed "king" of paper doll artists, responsible for training and supporting many respected paper doll manufacturers
- Fashion doll
- Dress-Up
- Kewpie
- Shikigami
