= Georgina A. Davis =

American artist (c. 1852–1901)

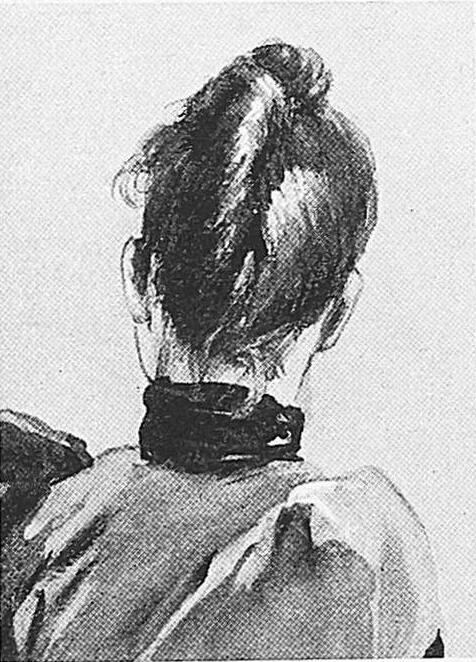
- self-portrait from The Quarterly Illustrator, 1894
- Born: c. 1852; New York City
- Died: 1901
- Occupations: Painter, illustrator, engraver, etcher

Georgina A. Davis (c. 1852 – 1901) was an American illustrator, painter, and engraver. She was a staff artist for Frank Leslie's Illustrated Newspaper, which featured hundreds of her illustrations. At the time, she was the only female staff artist working for a major American newspaper. Little is known of Davis' life despite the prominence of her work.

== Biography ==
Georgina A. Davis was born around 1852 in New York City. She studied art at Cooper Union School of Design for Women and the Art Students' League. Her first work to receive critical attention was The Bridge of Sighs, a depiction invoking the suicidal woman from the poem of the same name by Thomas Hood, which appeared on the cover of The Aldine in 1872 and at the Women's Pavilion at the 1876 Philadelphia Centennial Exposition.

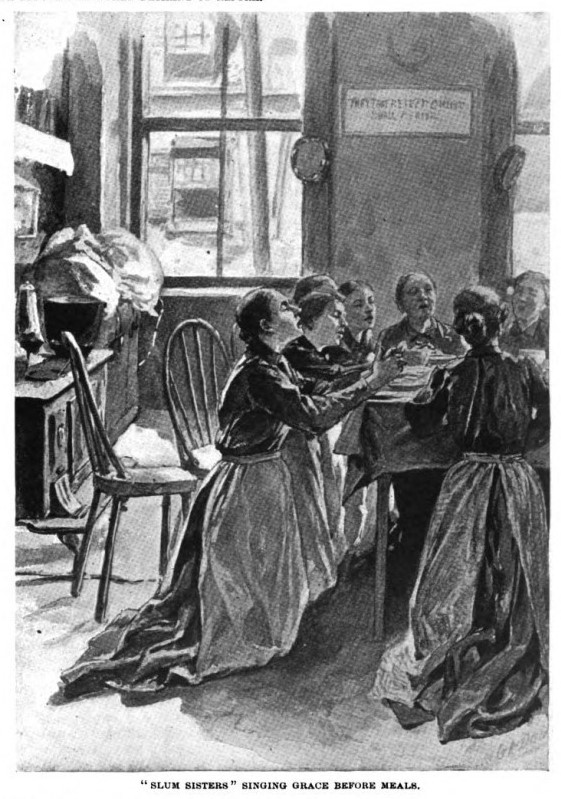
Georgina A. Davis's 1893 artwork showing the Salvation Army's "Slum Sisters" saying grace together

Davis began working for Frank Leslie's Illustrated Newspaper around 1880. The last picture accepted by Frank Leslie before he died was by Davis. Her work there mostly depicted women's events like charities. Some significant people she depicted include President Rutherford B. Hayes and his family, Ruth Cleveland, and Ute tribal leaders. She also worked as an illustrator for the Salvation Army newspaper The War Cry and the children's book publisher McLoughlin Brothers.

Her only known self-portrait appeared in the Quarterly Illustrator in 1894. The unusual depiction appears in the center of a gallery of photographs of the faces of male artists, while her self-portrait is a drawing with her facing away from the viewer.
