= Frank Leslie =

English-American artist and publisher

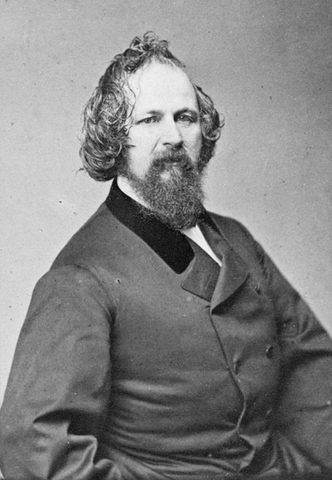
- Photograph of Frank Leslie, c. 1861
- Born: Henry Carter; March 29, 1821; Ipswich, England
- Died: January 10, 1880 (aged 58)

Frank Leslie (March 29, 1821 – January 10, 1880) was an English-born American engraver, illustrator, and publisher of family periodicals.

== Biography ==
=== Early life and career ===
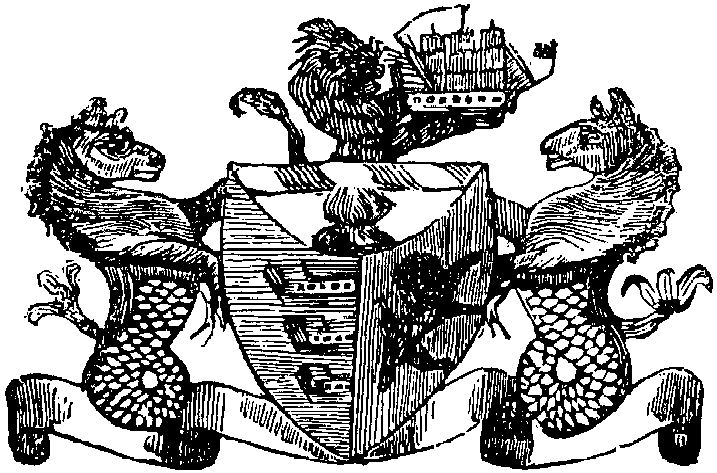
Frank Leslie's first wood engraving: the coat of arms of the town of Ipswich

Leslie was born on March 29, 1821, in Ipswich, England as Henry Carter, the son of Joseph Carter, the proprietor of a long-standing and prosperous glove manufacturing firm. He was educated in Ipswich, and he then trained for commerce in London. As a boy, on his way to and from school, he passed a silversmith's shop whose workers he took a detailed interest in, especially those who engraved designs and letters upon various articles of silver and gold. He took note of the tools that were used and the manner of using them, and acquired the necessary tools to do the work himself. At the age of 13, he did his first wood engraving of the coat of arms of his hometown.

At 17, he was sent to London to learn more about the glove-making business in the extensive dry goods establishment of his uncle, but every moment that could be snatched from the "dreary drudgery of the desk's dead wood" was surreptitiously devoted to sketching, drawing or engraving. His father, uncle and relatives so discouraged his artistic aspirations that he was constrained to keep his work a secret from them. He contributed sketches to the Illustrated London News, signing them as Frank Leslie to ensure his anonymity. These were so cordially welcomed that he eventually gave up commerce and was made superintendent of engraving at the Illustrated London News. He made himself an expert and inventor in his new work. It was here that he learned the operation known as overlaying – the system of regulating light and shade effects – in pictorial printing, a system which he was the first to introduce to the United States.

He was first married in England, and had three sons with his first wife: Harry, Alfred and Scipio. In 1857, he legally changed his name to Frank Leslie. He and his wife separated in 1860.

=== United States ===
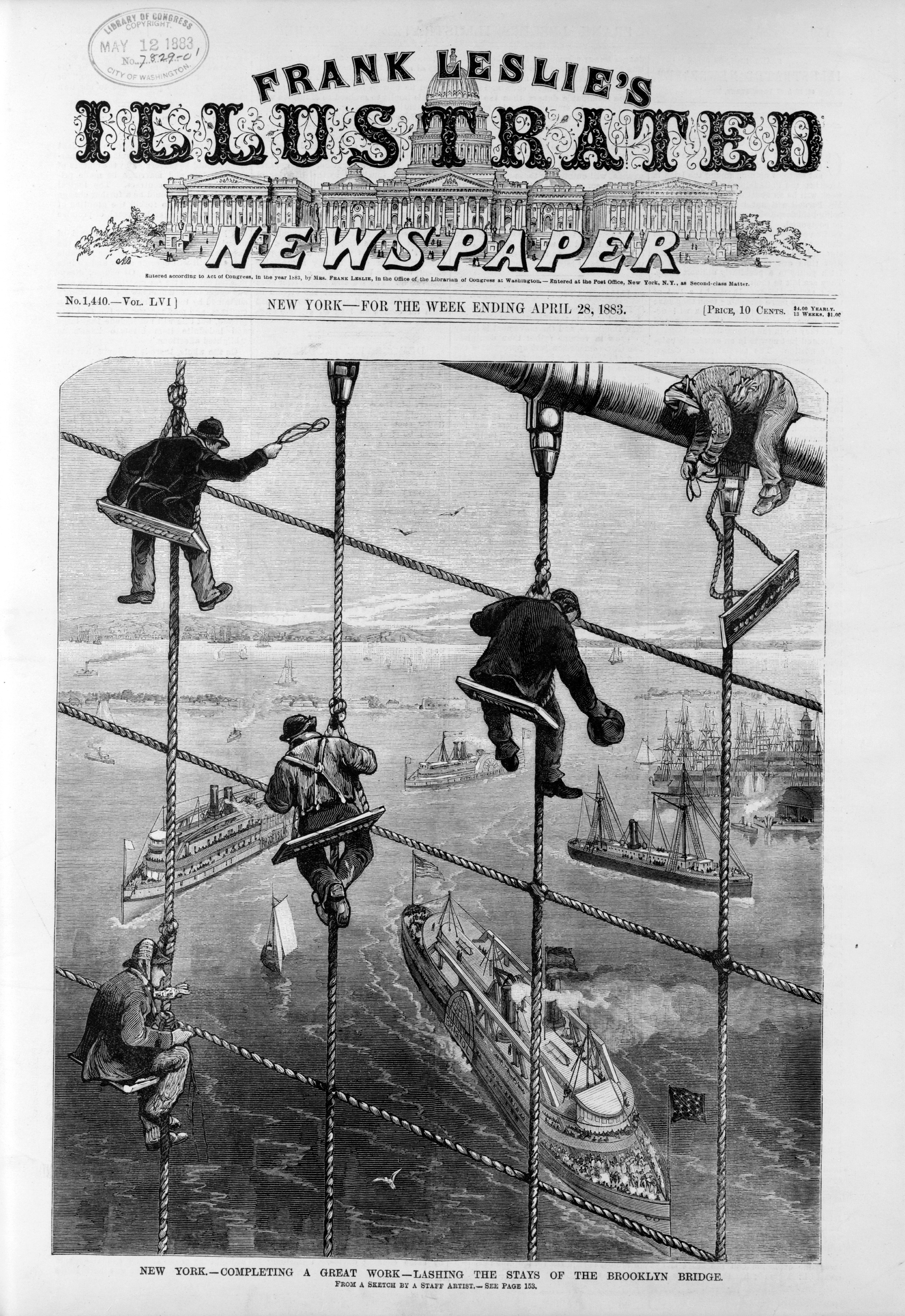
Frank Leslie's Illustrated Newspaper, April 1883

In 1848, he came to the United States. In 1852, he worked for Gleason's Pictorial in Boston, Massachusetts. He discovered he could accelerate the engraving process significantly by dividing a drawing into many small blocks and distributing the work among many engravers. A job on a large-format wood engraving, which might have taken a month for a single wood engraver to complete, could be completed in a day by 30 engravers.

In 1853, he arrived in New York City to engrave woodcuts for P. T. Barnum's short-lived Illustrated News. After its failure, he began publishing the first of his many illustrated journalistic ventures, Frank Leslie's Ladies' Gazette of Fashion and Fancy Needlework, with good woodcuts by Leslie & Hooper, a partnership which dissolved in 1854. The New York Journal soon followed, with Frank Leslie's Illustrated Newspaper (1855) (called Leslie's Weekly), The Boy's and Girl's Weekly, The Budget of Fun, and many others. Frank Leslie's Illustrated Newspaper, which included news as well as fiction, survived until 1922.

Illustrations made by Leslie and his artists on the battlefield during the American Civil War are well regarded for their historical value. He was commissioner to the Paris Exhibition of 1867 and received a prize there for his artistic services.

=== Second wife ===
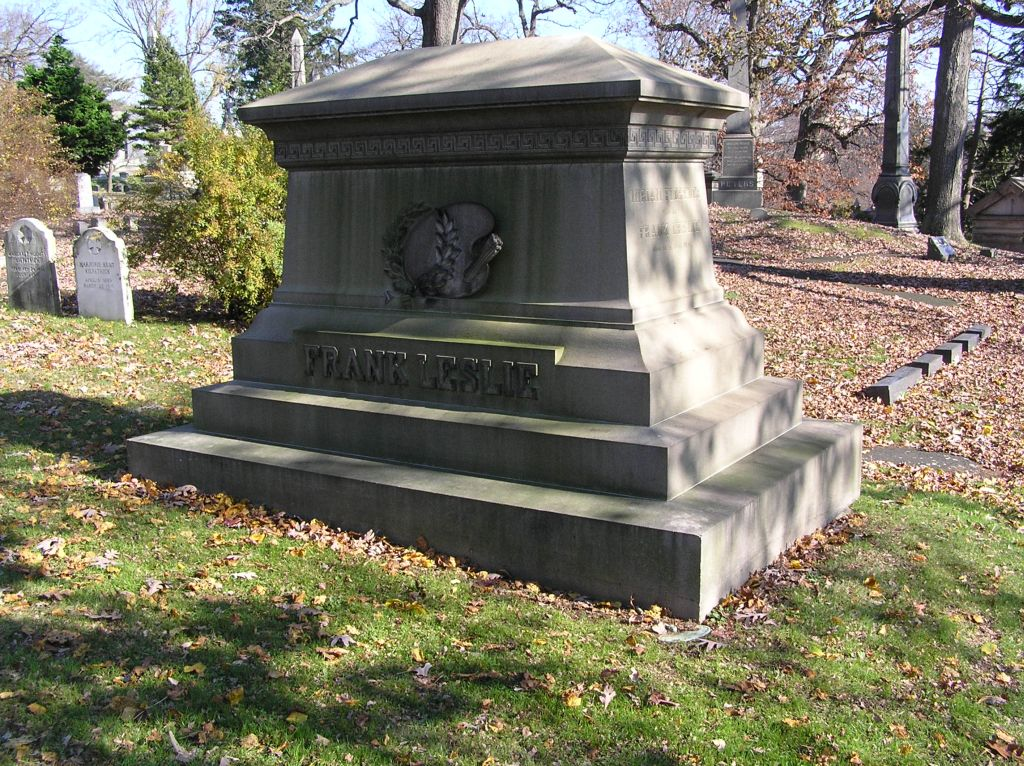
Grave monument of Frank Leslie in Woodlawn Cemetery.

Leslie met his second wife, then named Miriam Folline Squier, when her husband, Ephraim Squier, the editor of Leslie's Lady's Magazine, fell ill. Miriam volunteered to fill in for Ephraim, with Ephraim still receiving the salary. Ultimately, Miriam took on the position permanently; in 1873, she and Ephraim divorced, and shortly thereafter, about 1874, she and Leslie were married. It was his second marriage, and her third. Their summer home, Interlaken, was in Saratoga Springs, New York, where they entertained many notables. In 1877, they undertook a lavish train trip from New York to San Francisco, California, in the company of many friends. Miriam Leslie wrote her book From Gotham to the Golden Gate telling the story of this trip. The expense of this trip and a business depression left Leslie's business badly in debt.

Frank Leslie accepted his last illustration (by Georgina A. Davis) in January 1880 and died the same month, the debts amounted to $300,000, and his will was contested. Miriam Leslie took the business in hand and put it on a paying basis, even going so far as to have her name legally changed to Frank Leslie in June 1881. She was a notable feminist and author in her own right. Both his and her remains are interred at Woodlawn Cemetery in The Bronx, New York City.

== See also ==
- Frank Leslie's Weekly

== Works ==
- Die Weltausstellung in Philadelphia 1876. Leslie, New York 1876 digital
