= McLoughlin Brothers =

New York publishing firm

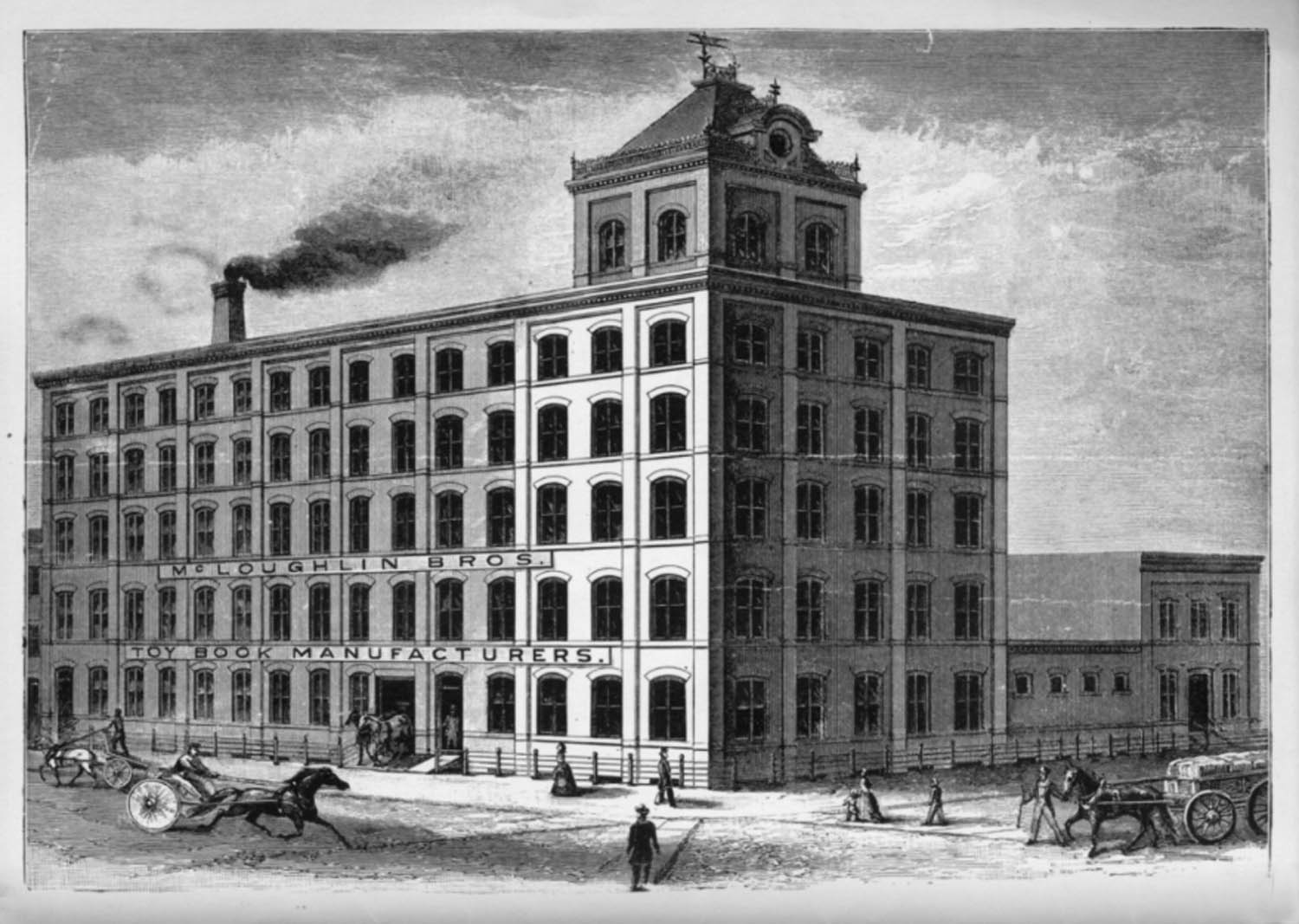
- The McLoughlin Brothers factory in 1886
- Type: Division (1920–1951)
- Industry: Publishing; Game
- Founded: 1858 (168 years ago)
- Founder: John McLoughlin, Jr.; Edmund McLoughlin
- Defunct: 1951 (75 years ago)
- Fate: Acquired by Milton Bradley in 1920 (106 years ago); became a division of it
- Successor: Julius Kushner (toys); Grosset & Dunlap (books)
- Headquarters: New York City, New York, U.S.
- Products: Picture books; Board games; Puzzles; Paper toys
- Number of employees: 75 (1870s)
- Parent: Milton Bradley (1920–1951)

McLoughlin Bros., Inc. was a New York manufacturing company active between 1858 and 1920.

As a publisher itself, the company was a pioneer in color-printing technologies in children's books. The company specialized in retellings or bowdlerizations of classic stories for children.

McLoughlin Bros. also produced board games, puzzles, and paper toys.

== History ==
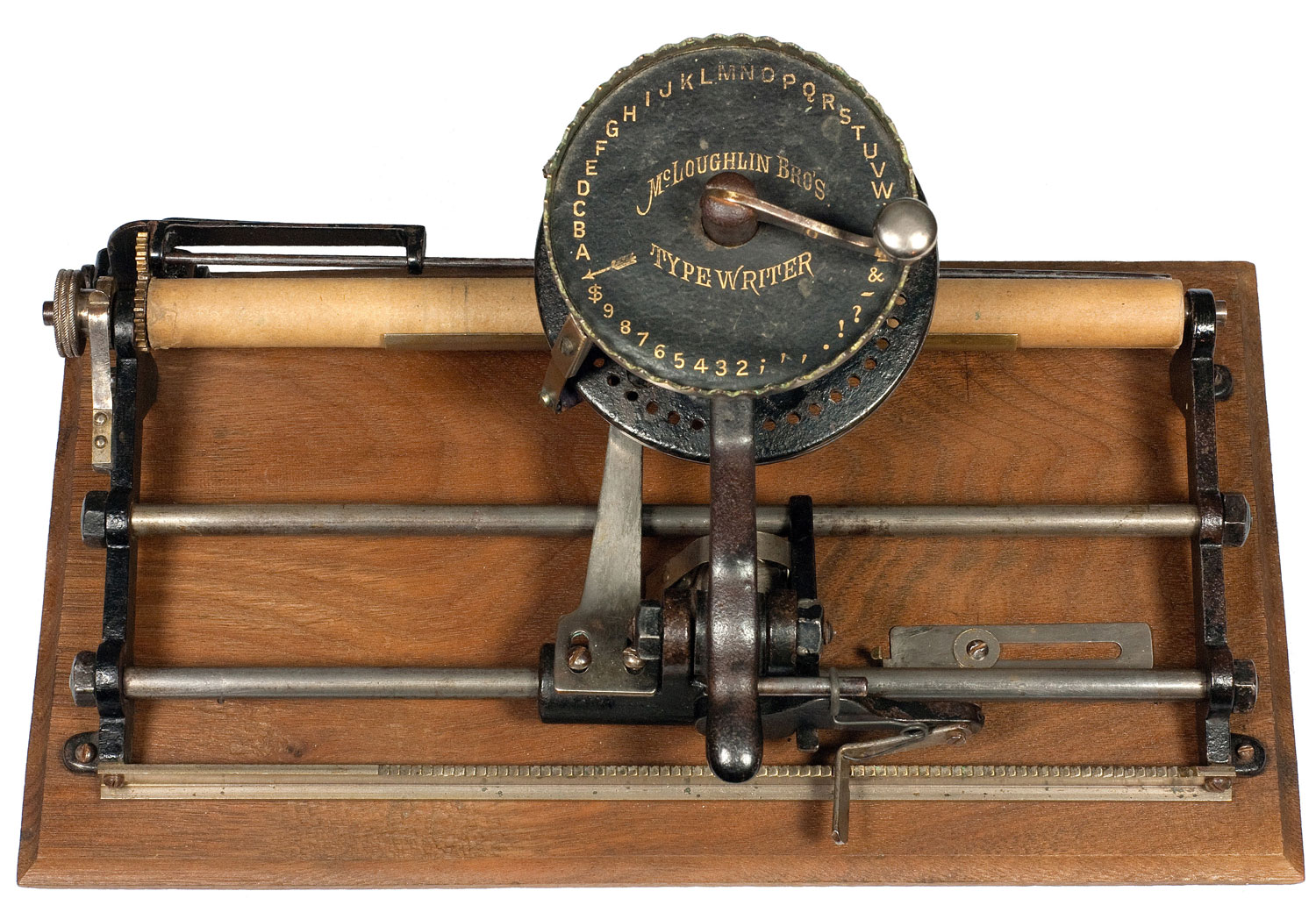
McLoughlin Brothers typewriter, 1884

The artistic and commercial roots of the McLoughlin firm were first developed by John McLoughlin, Jr. (1827–1905) who made his younger brother Edmund McLoughlin (1833 or 4 –1889) a partner in 1855. By 1886, the firm published a wide range of items, including cheap chapbooks, large folio picture books, linen books, puzzles, games, paper soldiers and paper dolls. In 1884, its typewriter appeared, which sold for $10.

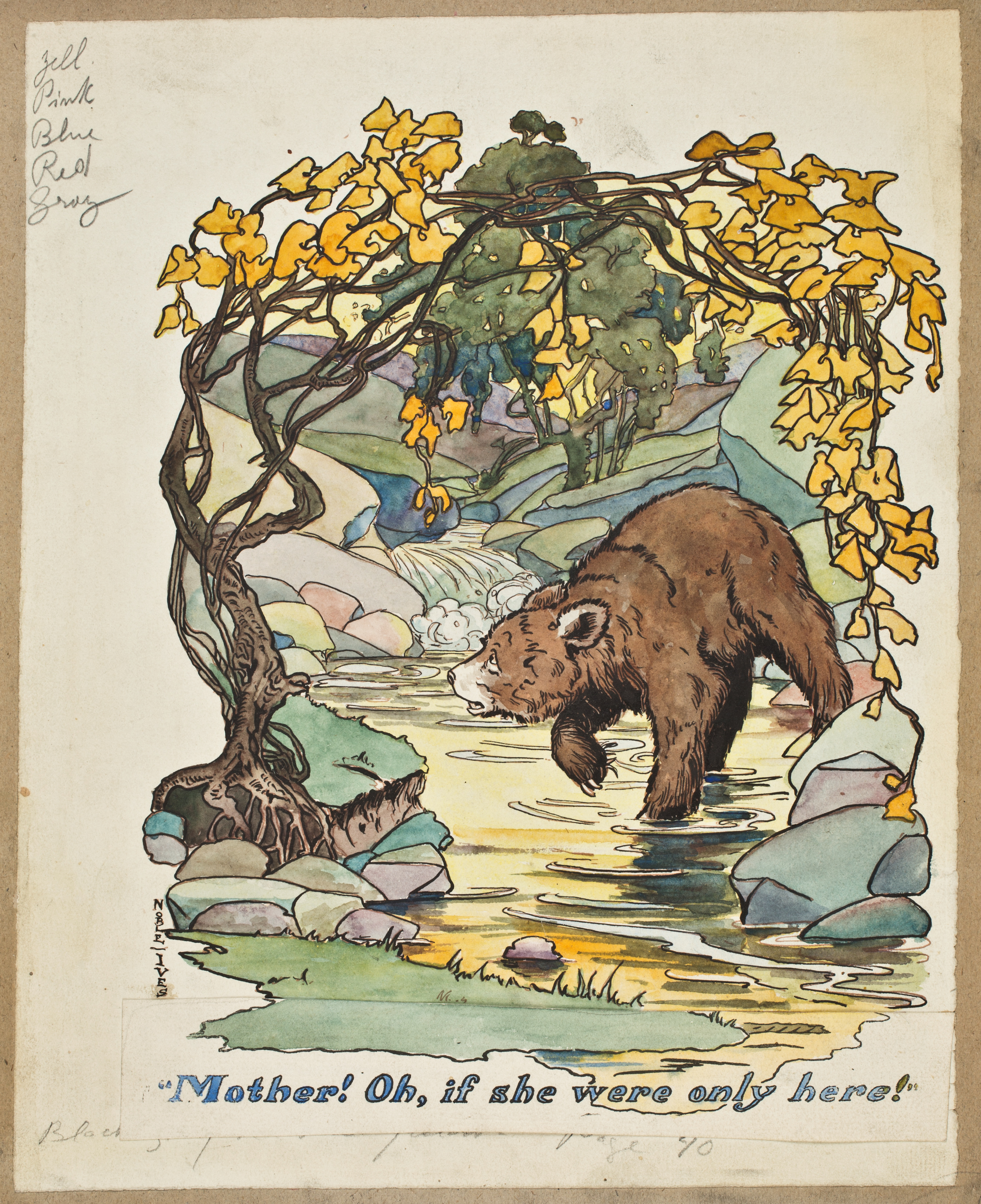
In this artwork for Teddy the Bear by Sarah Noble Ives, printer's notes regarding ink colors can be seen in the top left.

Many of the earliest and most-valuable board games in America were produced by McLoughlin Brothers of New York. In 1920, the corporation was sold to Milton Bradley & Company. McLoughlin ceased game production at this time, but continued publishing its picture books. Milton Bradley itself was purchased by Hasbro in 1984 and merged with Parker Brothers in 1998 to form Hasbro Games. The two became brands of Hasbro until 2009 when they were retired in favor of the Hasbro name.

The company worked with numerous artists of the time, including Sarah Noble Ives, William Bruton, Edward P. Cogger, Enos Comstock, Frances Bassett Comstock, Georgina A. Davis, Henry Walker Herrick, Justin H. Howard, May Audubon Post, Victor Renwick, Ida Waugh, and Lois Williams. These artists created richly colored watercolors as well as pen-and-ink drawings, which were adapted to the printing processes for mass production.

John McLoughlin, Jr.'s death in 1905 caused the firm the loss of his artistic and commercial leadership, so in 1920, it was sold to the Milton Bradley Company. Following that, the Brooklyn factory was closed and the firm moved to Springfield, Massachusetts. During its time as a division of Milton Bradley, McLoughlin ceased game production although it continued publicating picture books. McLoughlin Bros. enjoyed some success in the 1930s with mechanical paper toys called "Jolly Jump-Ups" but it stopped production during World War II.

In 1951, the "McLoughlin Brothers" trademark was sold to New York toy manufacturer Julius Kushner. At that time, their collection of original artwork for publication was split between members of the board. A portion of that collection was later donated to the American Antiquarian Society. In 1954, McLoughlin Brothers books were sold to Grosset & Dunlap. Kushner released some McLoughlin's successful products such as the Jolly Jump-Ups.

On the other hand, the McLoughlin line of children's books was sold to Grosset & Dunlap in June 1954. Several books bearing the 'McLoughlin Bros.' imprint were issued until the 1970s when the name dropped out of print.

== Works published ==
- Beverly Gray

1886 McLoughlin Bros' Catalog

- 2 Cent Books
  - May Bell Series (Plain and Colored)
  - Little Red Hen Series
  - Dr. Watts' Divine and Moral Songs
- 3 Cent Books
  - Little Object Finders' ABC
  - Farm Yard ABC
  - Rebus ABC
  - Little Pet's Primer
  - Golden ABC
  - Mother's Series
  - Father's Series
  - Uncle Dick's Series
- 5 Cent Books
  - Peter Prim's Series--New Edition. England
  - Fairy Moonbeam Series
  - Susie Sunshine's Series--New Edition. England
  - Slovenly Peter Series
- 6 Cent Books
  - Every Baby's ABC
  - Little Boys' and Girls' ABC
  - Noah's Ark ABC
  - Major's Alphabet
  - Nursery ABC and Simple Speller
  - Crowquills Fairy Tales
  - Miss Merryheart Series
  - Aunt Mary's Series--Old Books Re-printed
  - Aunt Mavor's Series
  - Willie Winkie's Series
  - Yellow Dwarf Series
  - Natural History Series
  - Cinderella Series
  - Dame Dingle's Series
  - Joyful Tales
  - Fairy ABS
  - ABC of Objects
  - Tom Thumb Alphabet
- 10 Cent Books
  - Parlor Plays
  - ABC of Animals
  - ABC of Nature
  - Aunt Jenny's Series--Old Books Re-printed
  - Mamma Lovechild's Series
  - Home Primer
  - Kate Greenaway Series
  - Over the Hills Series
  - Painting Books
  - Greenaway Mother Goose
  - The Ark Alphabet
  - Aunt Mayflower's Alphabet
  - Arthur's Alphabet
  - Child's First Book
  - Darling's ABC
  - The Child's Home ABC Book
  - Picture Alphabet
  - The Great Big ABC
  - Half-Hours with the Bible
  - Golden Light Series
  - Aunt Matilda's Series--New Editions--New Covers
  - Grandmother Goose Series
  - Uncle John's Drolleries
  - Uncle Ned's Picture Books
  - Aunt Kate's Series--New
  - Gilt Cover Picture Books

== See also ==
- List of companies based in New York City
- List of publishers of children's books
- List of toys
