= Albert Berghaus =

American illustrator

Eyewitness sketch of Lincoln assassination, published in Frank Leslie's Illustrated Newspaper, Albert Berghaus: Smithsonian Collection

Execution Of John Brown, Sketch By Albert Berghaus: Smithsonian Collection

Albert Berghaus (fl. 1869–1880) was an important American illustrator from the period immediately prior to the Civil War up to about the 1880s/1890s. He worked for Frank Leslie's Weekly, also known as Frank Leslie's Illustrated Newspaper, producing sketches and wood engravings of important events in contemporary American history. After the Civil War, he traveled in the west, and in the late 1870s he collaborated with Frederic Remington to illustrate "Tenting on the Plains," an account, possibly a magazine article, by Mrs. George Custer.

Original works by Berghaus are extremely scarce and held in some of the most prestigious public collections in the United States, including the Smithsonian, the Library of Congress, and the White House. In 1996, an original Berghaus sketch belonging to Jacqueline Kennedy that was purchased during her time as First Lady was sold at the Sotheby's auction of her belongings. Very few Berghaus originals exist in private hands.
