= Paper toys =

Type of toys made of paper

Paper toys are constructed in several ways, by folding, as in paper airplanes, paper fortune tellers or Origami, or by cutting, decorating or assembling pieces of paper with glue or tape to create a paper doll or paper model.

== Origami toys ==
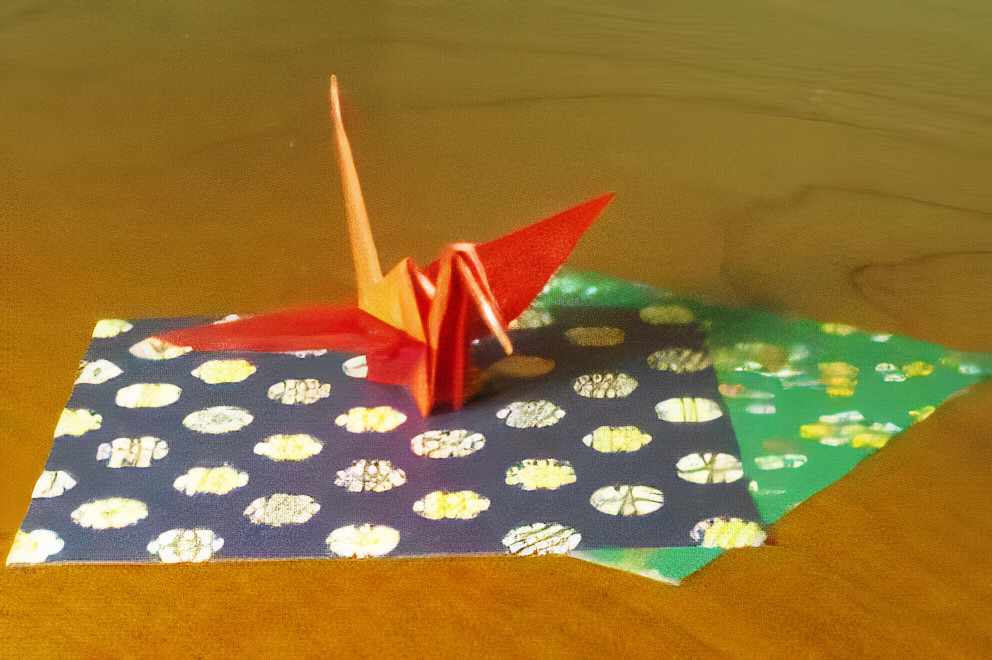
Origami crane

Paper toys date back to ancient times. The history of paper toys can be traced back to the art of origami (or-i-GA-me).The word is based on the Japanese words Ori, which means to fold, and Kami, which means paper. However origami's roots are from China and it spread to Japan somewhere around the sixth century.

The craft was for only the rich at first because the cost of paper was very high. They found useful ways to use the folded paper. For example, they would fold it with strips of dried meat or fish, and this was called Noshi, which was a token of good luck. Also they would often wrap the glasses of wine at a wedding into butterfly form to represent the bride and groom. As time went by new methods of making paper were developed which lowered the cost of paper. This allowed the art of origami to be more accessible to all people.

== Paper dolls ==
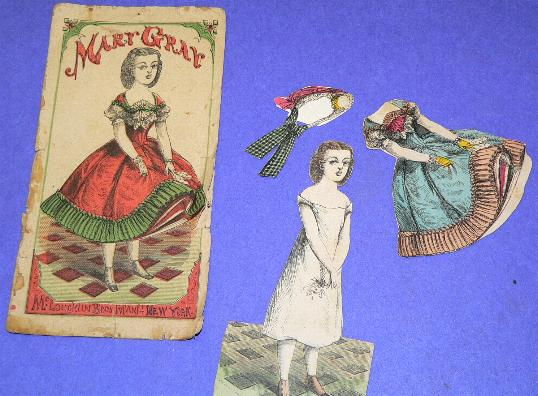
Paper doll with clothes

Paper dolls have been popular toys throughout the last couple of centuries. Unlike the origami and modern paper toys these are usually flat two-dimensional dolls. Often various paper clothes and such things are used to decorate the doll. Much alike the modern paper toys they would often print dolls that resemble popular celebrities, singers, and political figures. They also would print these dolls in magazines for children to cut out and color, they would have a page for the figures and then a page of all the costumes and add-ons.

== Modern toys ==
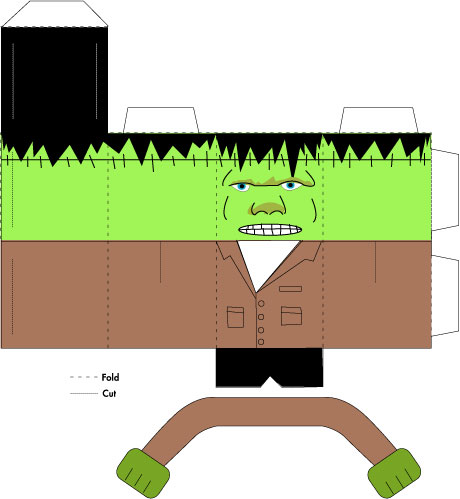
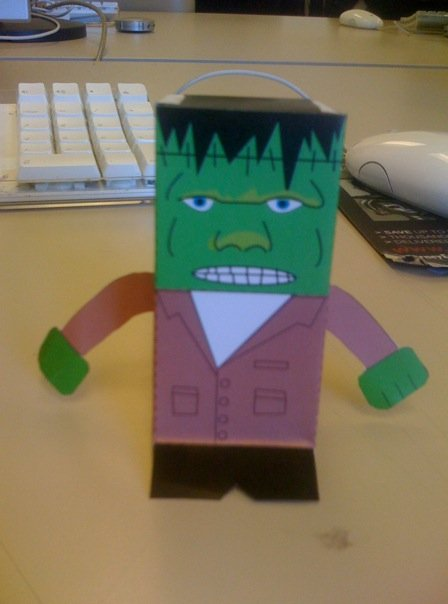
A paper toy of Frankenstein's monster

Modern paper toys can be made using paper, tape or glue, scissors and a printer. Templates for such toys can be downloaded from websites and printed.

== See also ==
- Action origami
- Cardboard modeling
- Net (polyhedron)
- Origamic architecture
- Paper plane
- Paper prototyping
- Paper model
- Pop-up books
