= Action origami =

Animatable origami

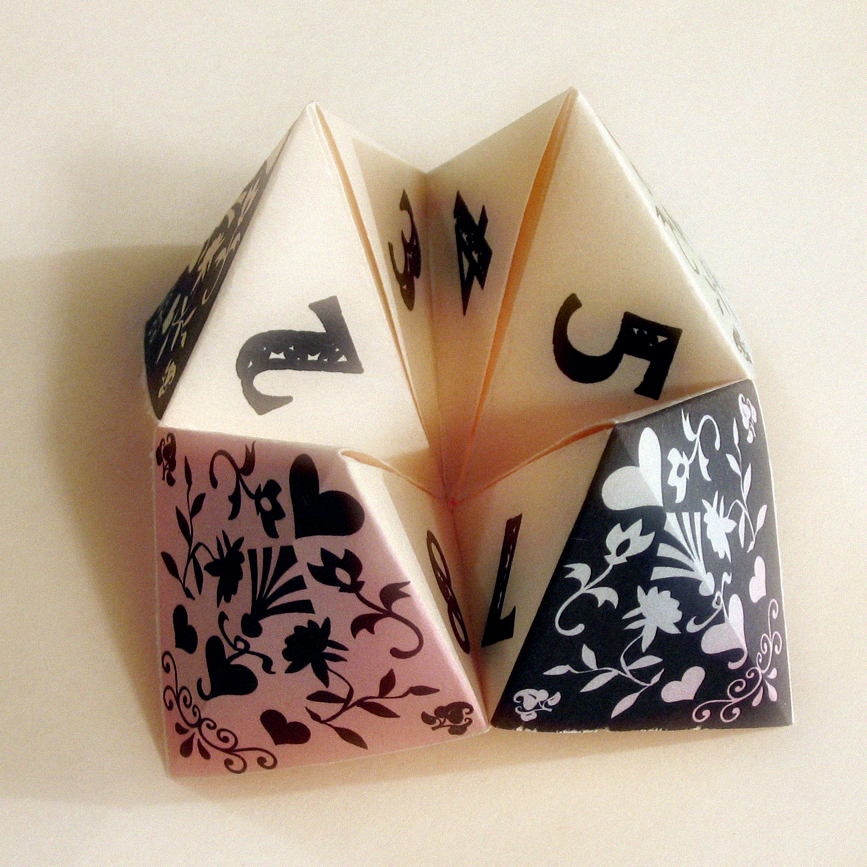
A decorated paper fortune teller.

Action origami is origami that can be animated. The original traditional action model is the flapping bird. Models of which the final assembly involves some special action, for instance blowing up a water bomb, are also typically classed as action origami. Rarer models like the paper plane and spinners which have no moving parts are included. Traditional action origami occasionally involved cuts, but modern models typically are constructed without them. Action origami are usually toys built to amuse, but some are designed to inspire wonder.

== Action toys ==
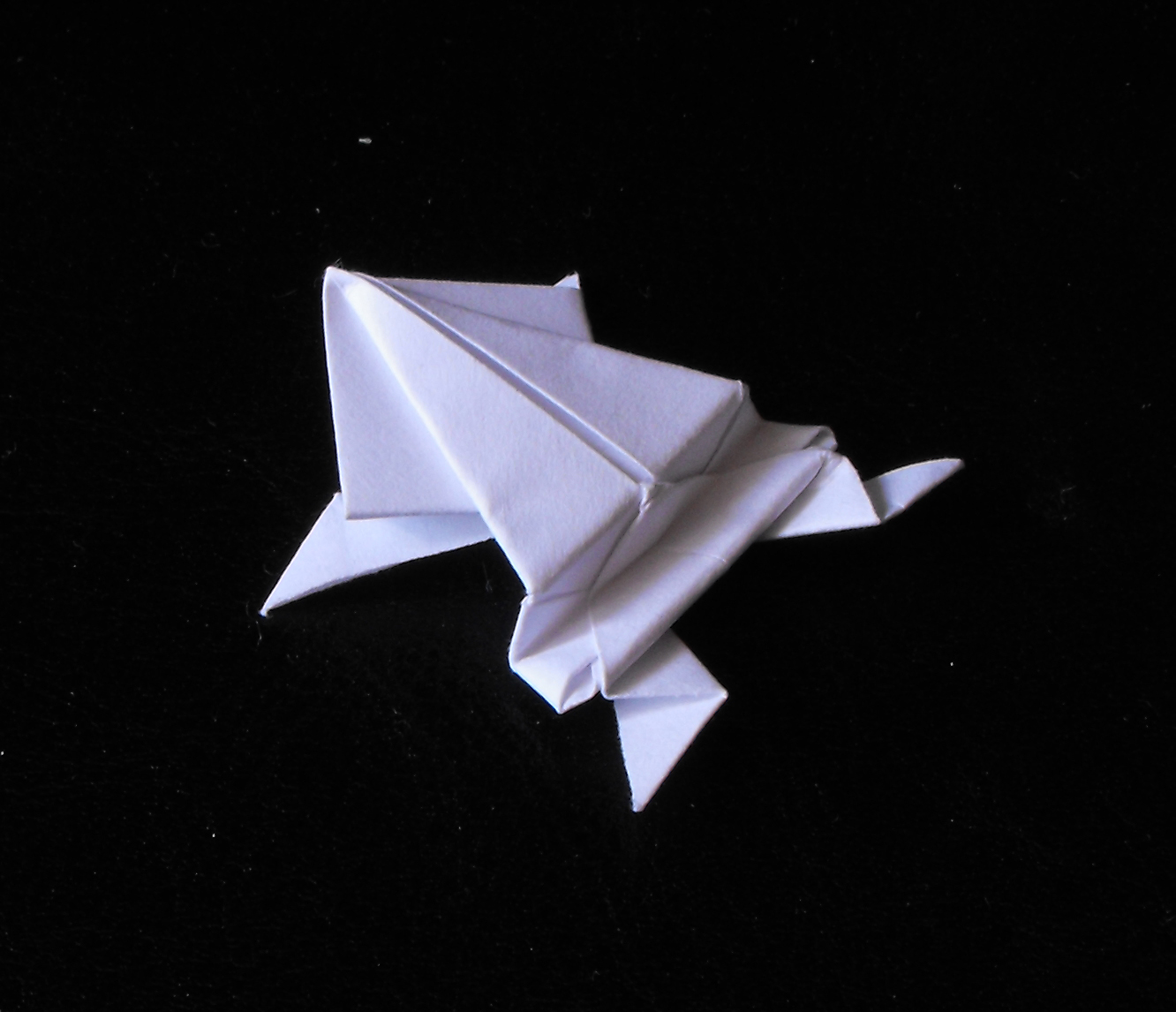
Jumping frog

Action toys include birds or butterflies with flapping wings, beaks that peck, and frogs that hop, as well as popular traditional models like the fortune teller. Paper poppers or bangers are models that make a noise when flicked down hard.

Some action origami is designed to accompany a story whilst it is built.

== Complex models ==
Some models are far too complex to be classified as toys. They are built to amaze and astonish. For instance, Robert J. Lang's Bassist, Pianist, and Violinist is a set of action models where each one plays an instrument when pulled on appropriately. Jeremy Shafer has made a number of extraordinary action models including a Swiss army knife with tools that open out, a slithering snake skin, and flashers, one of which he demonstrated on The Carol Duvall Show.

== Mathematical models ==
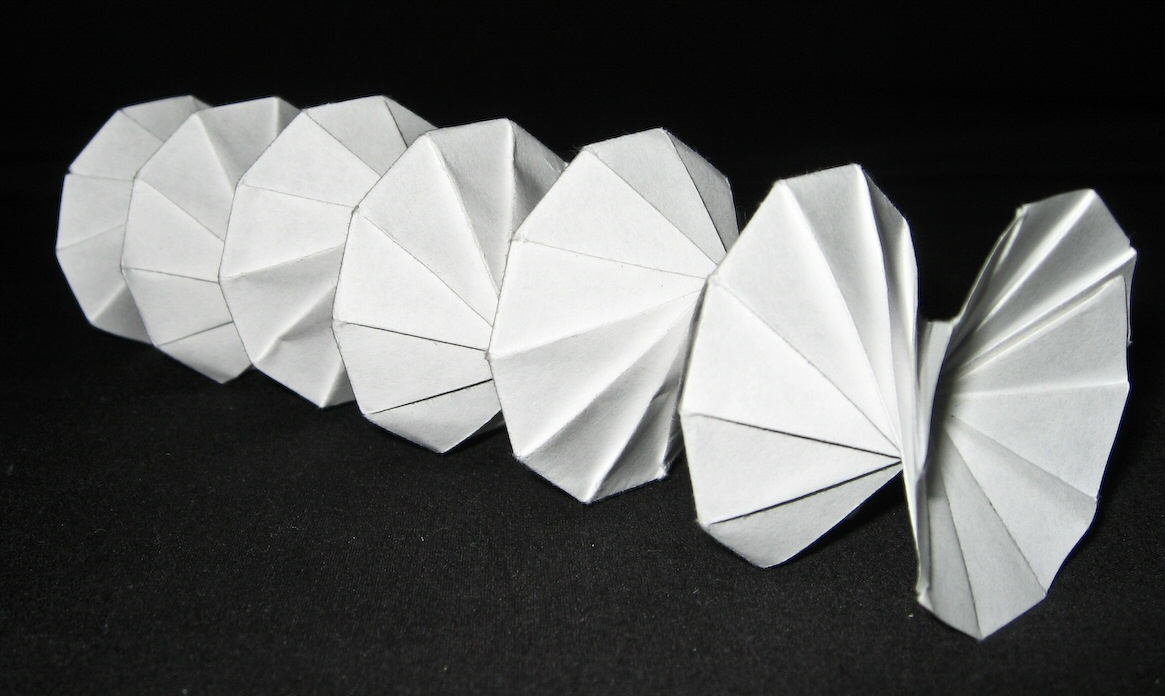
Spring Into Action, designed by Jeff Beynon.

Flashers are models with a regular pattern that can be folded up small and expanded rapidly. The Miura fold is a similar concept that has been used in commercial applications. Versions with a regular pattern can for instance be used to appear as a human figure when folded up and a maze when opened.

== Action origami using smart materials ==
Different smart material technologies are used by the researchers to yield active action origami structures. Scientists and engineers are using materials such as electroactive polymers (EAP), shape memory polymers, and shape memory alloys to achieve action origami structures. These origami-inspired concepts have a wide range of applications, such as a space deployable solar array, a heart stent, morphing wings, etc.
