= Campbell's Kids =

Cartoon mascots of Campbell Soup Company

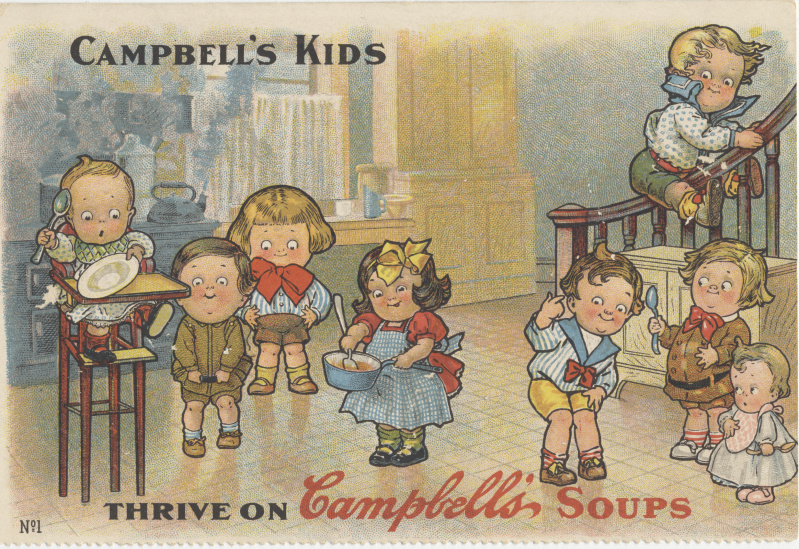
Campbell Kids

The Campbell Kids are the advertising cartoon mascot of the Campbell's. Drawn by Grace Drayton in 1904, the characters became popular almost immediately, leading to the production of dolls, cookbooks, cards, plates, T-shirts, and many other items fashioned in their likeness. The Campbell Kids have spanned many generations and still represent the Campbell Soup Company today.

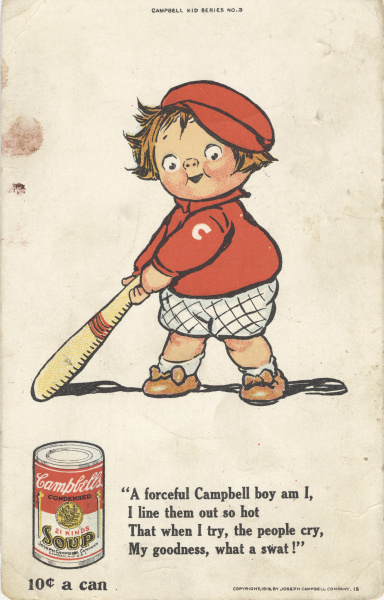
Advertisement with Campbell Kid

== History ==
By 1904, Campbell realized they needed a character that would extol the virtues of Campbell soup. Grace Drayton, a freelance illustrator of children’s book and comic strips, was known for her chubby figures with round faces, wide-set eyes, and a pug nose. The artist modeled her characters after herself as she once stated in a newspaper interview in 1926, “I was much interested in my looks. I knew I was funny [looking].” The Campbell executives were delighted with her “round and jolly toddlers,” and thus the Campbell Kids were born.

These plump toddlers represented the era’s perception of health and wholesomeness. The public was introduced to them through streetcar advertisements beginning in 1905. Each ad featured a jingle at the top, a red-and-white can on the right, and a Campbell Kid on the left (Fig 4 and 5). Public reaction to the Kids was almost immediate. Requests for copies of the ads inundated the company, and it only charged customers fifteen cents to cover postage. These kinds of requests lasted for decades, demonstrating the continual popularity of the Campbell Kids (Fig 6). Mothers hung images of the Kids on nursery walls, and teachers placed them in classrooms.

In the same year, the Campbell company made its first appearance in magazine advertisements in Ladies’ Home Journal and later Good Housekeeping, and by 1909 it made its newspaper debut in the Saturday Evening Post. The Campbell Kids featured prominently in these ads as Campbell adopted the tots as the company emblems. The Campbell Kid imagery became so popular that they animated postcards, bridge tallies, place cards, and lapel pins. The use of jingles and familiar characters were common in the early twentieth century. Company characters were cross-marketed with other objects in order to spread brand recognition.

== Targeting consumers ==
The Kids were attractive to children, but they also promoted prevailing societal ideologies as well, mirroring what adult consumers wanted to see in themselves. The early twentieth century saw the birth of modern America and her “relentless faith in progress and can-do spirit.” The Campbell Kids fit well into this framework as they espoused a message of optimism in progress and loyalty to brand and country. Advertising professionals claimed to contribute to progress by guiding consumers to wise product selection. These businesspeople saw themselves as agents of change through material production, and therefore, cultural progress. Advertisers identified women as the primary consumer of many products, so ads often depicted how women could use the advertised technologies to improve their families according to progressive bourgeois values. An important value within the progressive framework was health which resulted in an increasing importance in the purity and nutritional value of food.

=== Sanitation Standards ===
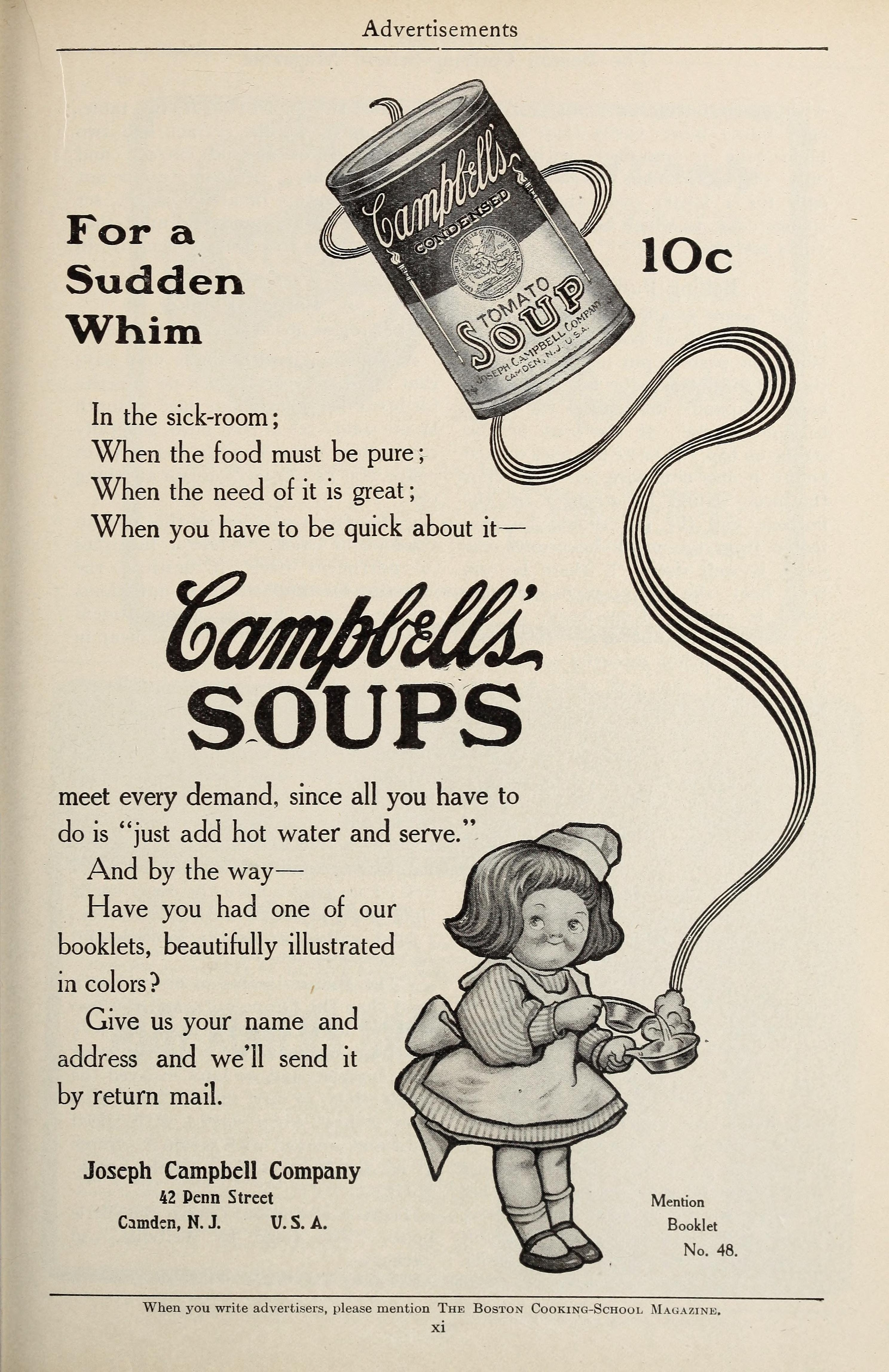
Advertisement promoting Campbell's Soup as the healthy choice

In the twentieth century, there was a campaign to improve sanitation standards in all spheres of American life. Advertising played a significant role in bringing the issue to the American public. Many companies during the period produced goods that they claimed would help fight disease. In Campbell’s early advertising campaigns, the company addressed women consumers and attempted to create insecurities about their roles as mothers and homemakers within a changing modern America. Campbell soup, the ads promised, would not only be convenient, but it also was a healthy choice for their children. The soups are “healthful, wholesome, and absolutely dependable” and “are the result of combining goodness and quality in materials, with conscience in the making,” an ad from 1906 explains (Fig 9). Previously women relied on local grocers to ensure the nutrition and safety of the food they fed their children, but in the modern age, advertising acquired the role. One of the most consistent food advertising messages that targeted mothers was about their children’s health. Chubby, happy, healthy children were used to advertise the health benefits of a product to mothers, as the woman would imagine her own child among the cheerful figures. The Campbell Kids epitomized this strategy, and they guaranteed that with help of Campbell’s soup, the consumer’s children would withstand disease.

Advertisers would also adopt scare tactics to persuade mothers into buying their food. Infant and child mortality was still a significant risk for mothers in the early twentieth century. Improvements in technology and medicine helped reduce this possibility, but during the warm summer months and in close quarters with urban neighbors, mothers were aware of the prospect. Within this context, advertisements led mothers to believe that their only hope to keep their children safe was to purchase the correct foods. Campbell used these same techniques to demonstrate to women consumers that their soup would not only be nutritionally good for their children, but their children would love the taste too.

=== Social Darwinism ===
This discussion on children’s health came out of Social Darwinism, a common feature in advertisements in the early twentieth century. Social Darwinism emphasized how mothers could affect their children’s lives, for better or for worse. Within a competitive economic environment, even greater significance was given to making wise decisions when children were young in order to place them on a path to success. Mothers were responsible for their children’s health and for molding their characters, and advertisers suggested that they could do so through their food habits. Women’s “choices in the kitchen would shape not only their own children, but their community and their country.”

== Dolls ==
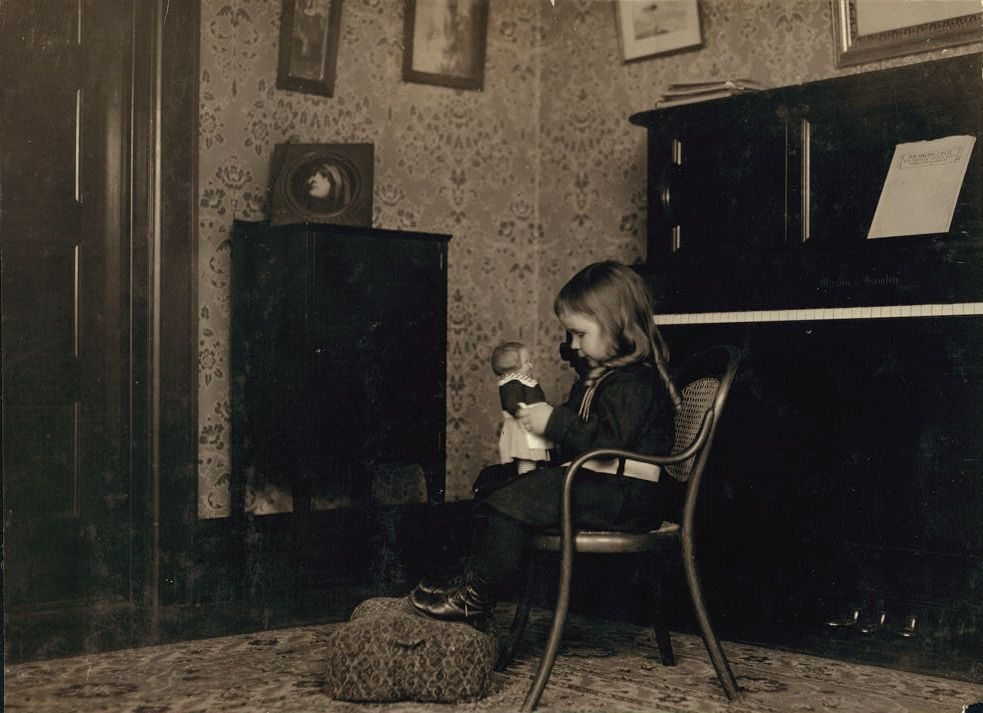
Little girl conversing with a Campbell Kid doll

Campbell’s soup offered an avenue for the consumption of an American product, and in 1909 the company had a new product on the market: the Campbell Kid doll. The first Campbell Kid doll was a stuffed velvet character, but the more well-known dolls emerged in 1910, made by the E. I. Horsman company. The dolls were very popular, and by 1912, thousands were sold through Sears, Roebuck and Co. and Montgomery Ward catalogs. The Campbell Kid dolls came in a variety of sizes (eleven to sixteen inches in height), styles (little Dutch girl and boy, petite, peekaboo), and compositions (cloth, bisque, and composite material). The Dutch Campbell Kid was first advertised in the 1914 Sears, Roebuck and Co. catalog. The dolls were available throughout the teens and into the forties as premiums and purchased goods.

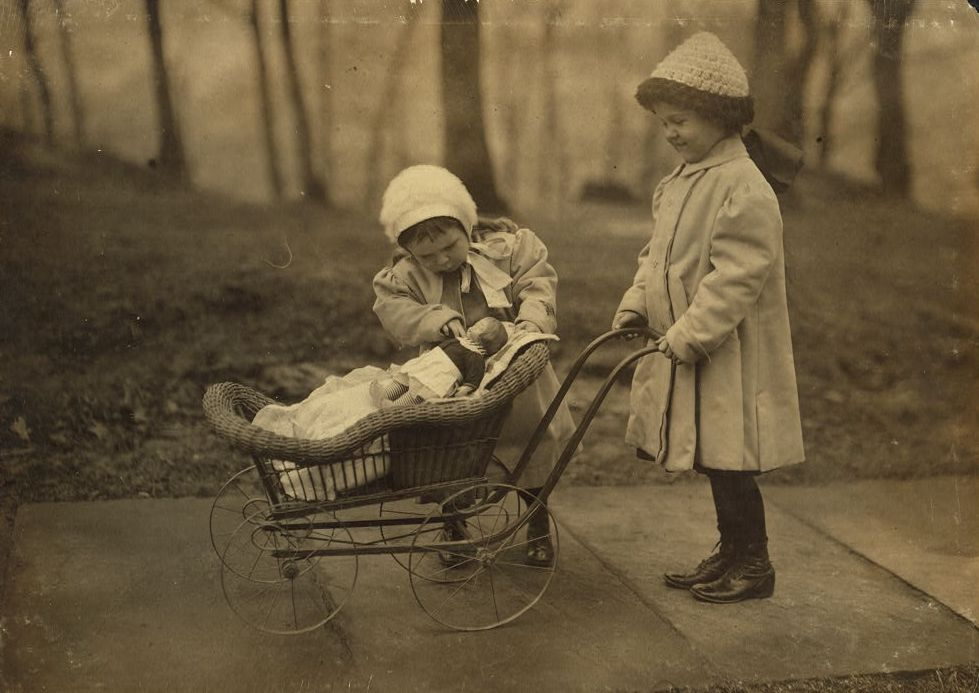
Children playing with Campbell Kid dolls

The consumer market of the early twentieth century incorporated the transformed toy trade into its marketing strategies. Toys and dolls became “name branded” in order to promote brand recognition. The Campbell Kid dolls are the epitome of the partnership between food product and toy product. The healthy, happy Campbell Kids that promoted the purity and nutritional value of their product took the form of doll, and parents gave them to their children. Because children were serving the psychological needs rather than the economic needs of adults by the twentieth century, cherished as emotional assets and bringing love into the family, parents showed their affection through “the number and cost of toys they gave to their children." The result was that children were becoming a larger part of the consumer market, and companies like the Campbell Soup Company understood this dynamic when promoting brand-named toys. The almost impish expressions of the Smithsonian’s Campbell Kid dolls, their soft cuddly bodies, and their stylish dress were all signals to consumers that they were a part of a new style of doll promoting personal relationships and the imagination.

== Evolution ==
Over time, the Campbell Kids changed in order to keep up with new cultural attitudes and changing standards of physical well-being. In the 1920s, Campbell girls donned flapper dresses and danced the Charleston. Other Campbell Kids were depicted talking on the telephone, flying airplanes, riding construction cranes, and visiting Egypt. These images reflected the increasingly ubiquitous telephone, Lindbergh’s famous transatlantic journey, the rise of skyscraper, and the discovery of King Tut’s tomb. The Campbell Kids were no longer in every Campbell advertisement.

In the 1930s, during the Great Depression, advertisers determined that the Campbell Kids were ill-suited for the sober economic times. However, advertisers introduced the slogan “M’m! M’m! Good!” and Campbell Kid voices were on the radio shows like Amos n’ Andy. In advertisements, the Kids were dressed as policemen, utility workers, circus trainers, drummer boys, and other roles in service and entertainment.

In the 1940s, during World War II, newsprint and tin rationing resulted in cuts in both advertising and soup production, so the Campbell Kids were not as visible as in past years. When they were depicted, they were engaged in wartime production as war bond salesmen and air raid wardens. In 1944, the Campbell Soup Company received an achievement award from the U.S. Department of War for its contributions to the war effort.

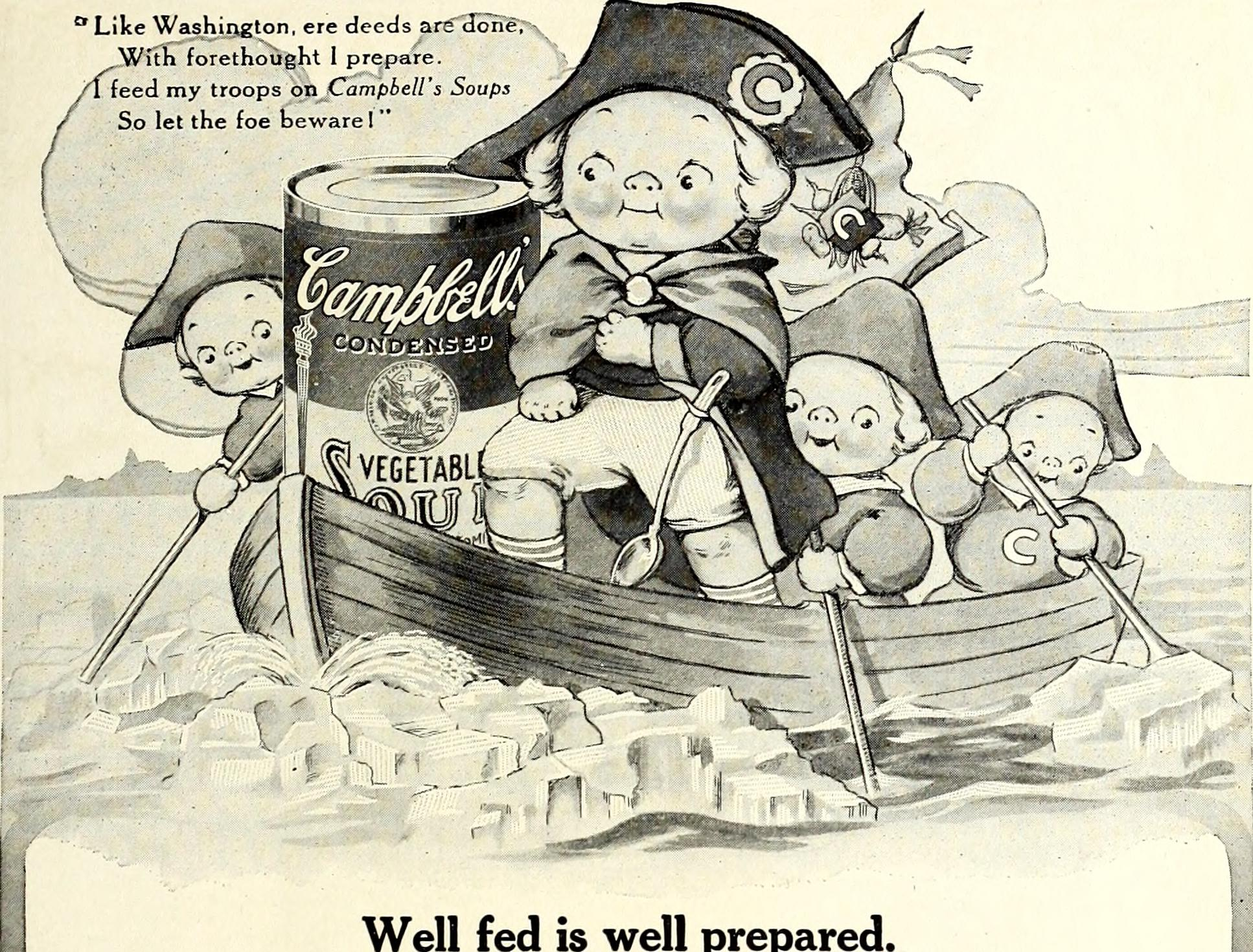
A Campbell Kid dressed up as Washington for the United States' bicentennial event

The 1950s brought on a revival of the Campbell Kids with the rising medium of television and the decade’s emphasis on domesticity. The spread of suburbia and the baby boom contributed to the Kids’ success, and Campbell Kid merchandise of all kinds filled shelves in grocery and department stores. To prepare for their television debut, the Kids were given larger eyes, new clothes, and slightly squarer heads. In commercials they sang “a song of soup sense”, and once again they were prominent in Campbell advertisements.[6] The Kids celebrated their 50th birthday in 1955.

The 1960s was a decade of social change in the United States, and although Andy Warhol inserted the Campbell soup can into the art world, the Campbell Kids were left largely out of the picture. The Kids were used to introduce the Campbell Soup Company’s new Bounty Line and Red Kettle soups and were seen in some television commercials.

In the 1970s the Campbell Kids remained on the side lines. Campbell merchandise did make sporadic comebacks, and the Kids commemorated the United States’ bicentennial event in colonial clothing.

The Campbell Kids became more active in the 1980s, promoting youth fitness and slimming down themselves. They participated in soccer, basketball, gymnastics, weightlifting, skiing, and ice skating. The Campbell Kids diversified as well, finally taking on different races and ethnicities. They still advocated for healthy living and were now promoting healthy self-esteem.

The Kids remained active in the 1990s, and they pursued more adventurous activities such as hiking up mountaintops and paragliding. They were also depicted studying hard at school and working at computers. The Campbell Kids enjoyed modern conveniences such as boom boxes and skateboards, but they were sometimes illustrated in their traditional early twentieth-century dress. The decade saw their transformation into digital animation.

The Campbell Kids were digitally rendered as 3-D figures at the start of the twenty-first century. The Campbell Soup Company’s creative team have begun to consider separating the Kids into three age groups ranging from toddlers to preteens. The Kids now take on various personalities from techno-geek and skater to fashionista, jock, artsy bohemian, and hip-hopper. One suggestion to make the Kids more relevant calls to depict them in more contemporary styles such as anime.
