= Frank Leslie's Illustrated Newspaper =

American magazine

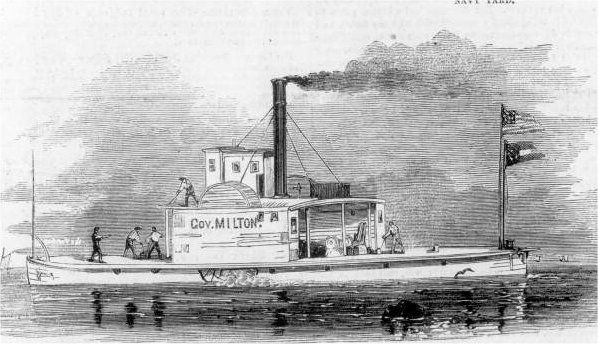
- USS Governor Milton by Frank Leslie's Illustrated Newspaper
- First editor: John Y. Foster
- Categories: Literary and news
- Frequency: Weekly
- Circulation: c. 65,000 (by 1897); peaked at 164,000 (c. 1860)
- Publisher: Frank Leslie
- First issue: December 15, 1855
- Final issue: June 17, 1922
- Company: Leslie-Judge Co.
- Country: United States
- Based in: New York City, New York
- Language: English

Frank Leslie's Illustrated Newspaper, later renamed Leslie's Weekly, was an American illustrated literary and news magazine founded in 1855 and published until 1922. It was one of several magazines started by publisher and illustrator Frank Leslie.

Throughout its existence, the weekly provided illustrations and reports—with wood engravings, lithographs and steel engravings based on sketches and photography, beginning with daguerreotypes and later with more advanced forms of photography—of wars from John Brown's raid at Harpers Ferry and the Civil War to the Spanish–American War and the First World War - and numerous other articles of topical interest.

== History ==
=== Background ===
Frank Leslie was the pen name of Henry Carter (1821–1880), the son of a well-to-do English glovemaker. Carter had taken up the art of wood engraving over his father's objection and emigrated to New York City, arriving in 1853 and immediately adopting "Frank Leslie" as his pseudonym. Unable to find a position as an illustrator with an established newspaper, he opened his own business, an engraving shop on Broadway.

One of Leslie's early clients was promoter P. T. Barnum, who commissioned Leslie to produce a posh illustrated concert program for singer Jenny Lind in 1849. Additional work was done for Barnum for another Lind tour in 1850 and 1851. When Barnum decided to launch a publication called The Illustrated News in 1853, he turned to Leslie, hiring him as chief engraver for the short-lived publication, which failed within its first year of existence.

Leslie decided to begin publishing on his own, launching two new periodicals in 1854—Frank Leslie's Ladies' Gazette of Fashion, a fashion-oriented newspaper, and Frank Leslie's Journal of Romance, an illustrated fiction magazine. Both of these publications proved to be financially lucrative, and in 1855, Leslie added a third publication, an illustrated news weekly called Frank Leslie's Illustrated Newspaper.

=== Early years ===
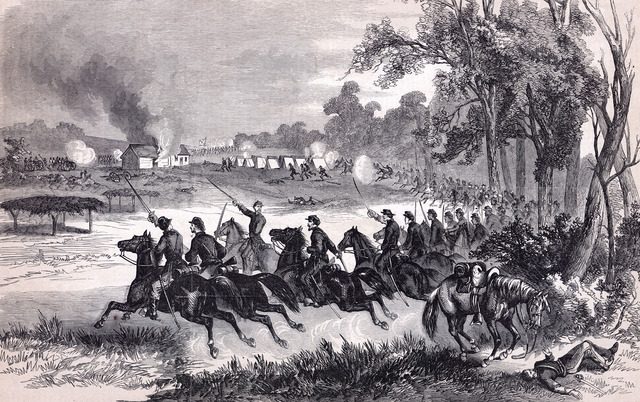
Leslie's Civil War lithographic sketch of the Battle of Honey Springs, published August 29, 1863

The first years of Frank Leslie's Illustrated Newspaper were difficult, with the nation undergoing a business crisis in 1857. The drama of the massive American Civil War in 1861, though, ensured the success of Leslie's Newspaper, as tens of thousands of readers turned to Leslie's and the upstart Harper's Weekly for their sometimes lurid illustrations of the bloody conflict. A Leslie's freelancer, James R. O'Neill, is believed to have been the only Civil War correspondent killed in action in the Civil War.

No daily newspaper in America consistently carried illustrations until the launch of The Daily Graphic in 1873, by which time Leslie's Newspaper was a massive and prosperous concern, employing more than 300 people, including 70 illustrators, as part of a publishing empire which by now spanned seven publications.

=== Production process ===
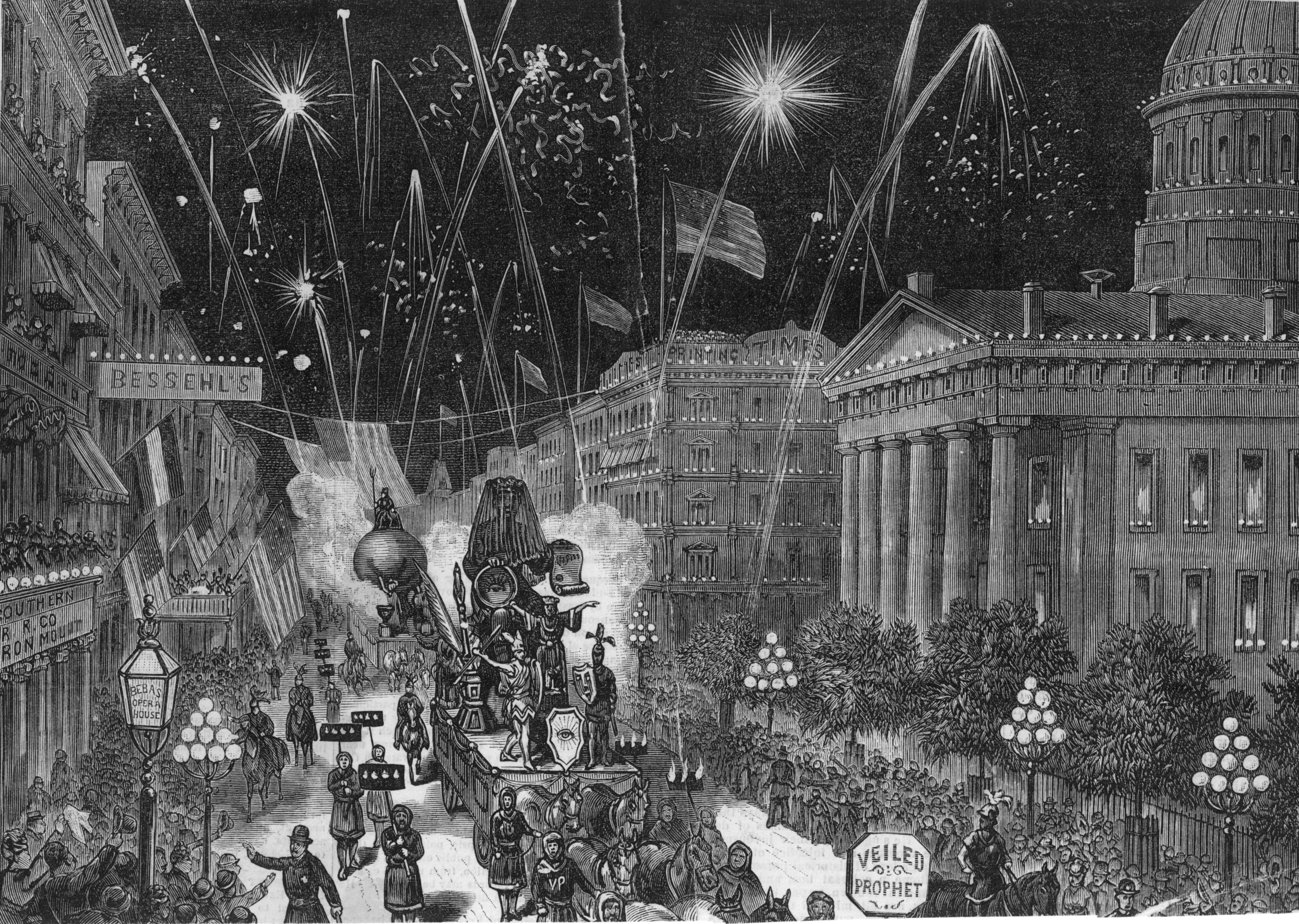
Veiled Prophet Parade, 1878, St. Louis, Missouri. Woodcut by Edward Jump from Frank Leslie's Illustrated Newspaper, October 1878

Leslie's Newspaper averaged 16 pages and was frequently accompanied by supplements or expanded into special thematic editions. Content strove to be timely, focusing on the newsworthy events of the previous week, often within days of its occurrence, a novelty for the era. Art was produced by teams, with initial sketches selected by an editor and turned over to an illustrator, who produced an outline drawing. The outline was then applied to a block consisting of multiple layers of Turkish boxwood and additional detail added by specialized artists.

The large block of wood was then separated into its constituent pieces and turned over to the engraving department, which meticulously carved out the white sections, leaving the black illustration in relief. The sections of the wood block were then rejoined and sent to the composing room, where the illustration was converted to part of an electrotyped copper plate for printing.

=== Years after Frank Leslie's death ===
After Leslie's death in 1880, the magazine was continued by his widow, women's suffrage campaigner Miriam Florence Leslie. The name, by then a well-established trademark, remained also after 1902, when it no longer had a connection with the Leslie family. The magazine was merged into Judge (which was under the same ownership) effective with the June 24, 1922 issue, having switched to a monthly publication in February, 1921, shortly after its parent company was placed into receivership.

It often took a strongly patriotic stance and frequently featured cover pictures of soldiers and heroic battle stories. It also gave extensive coverage to less martial events such as the Klondike gold rush of 1897, covered by San Francisco journalist John Bonner.

Among the writers publishing their stories in the weekly were Louisa May Alcott, H. Irving Hancock, Helen R. Martin, Eleanor Franklin Egan, and Ellis Parker Butler. Several notable illustrators worked for the publication, including Albert Berghaus and Norman Rockwell, who created covers for the magazine in its latter years, Emmett Watson, and Fernando Miranda y Casellas. James Montgomery Flagg's iconic depiction of Uncle Sam first appeared publicly on the cover of the July 6, 1916, issue, with the caption "What Are You Doing for Preparedness?", before becoming a famed recruiting poster on American entry into World War I. Pioneering aviator Harriet Quimby was a frequent contributor for 10 year, serving as the magazine's aviation editor after she became the first American woman to become a licensed pilot, in 1911, after several years of writing for the magazine on a number of different subjects (including serving as the magazine's drama critic, and as a travel writer for which she was often credited as a photographer). Some of her final writings for the magazine were on the topic of aviation and aviation safety, with her final article appearing in the issue published a week after her death in a flying accident on July 1, 1912.

By 1897, the publication's circulation had grown to an estimated 65,000 copies.

== See also ==
- Cathedral of All Saints (Albany, New York)

== Gallery ==
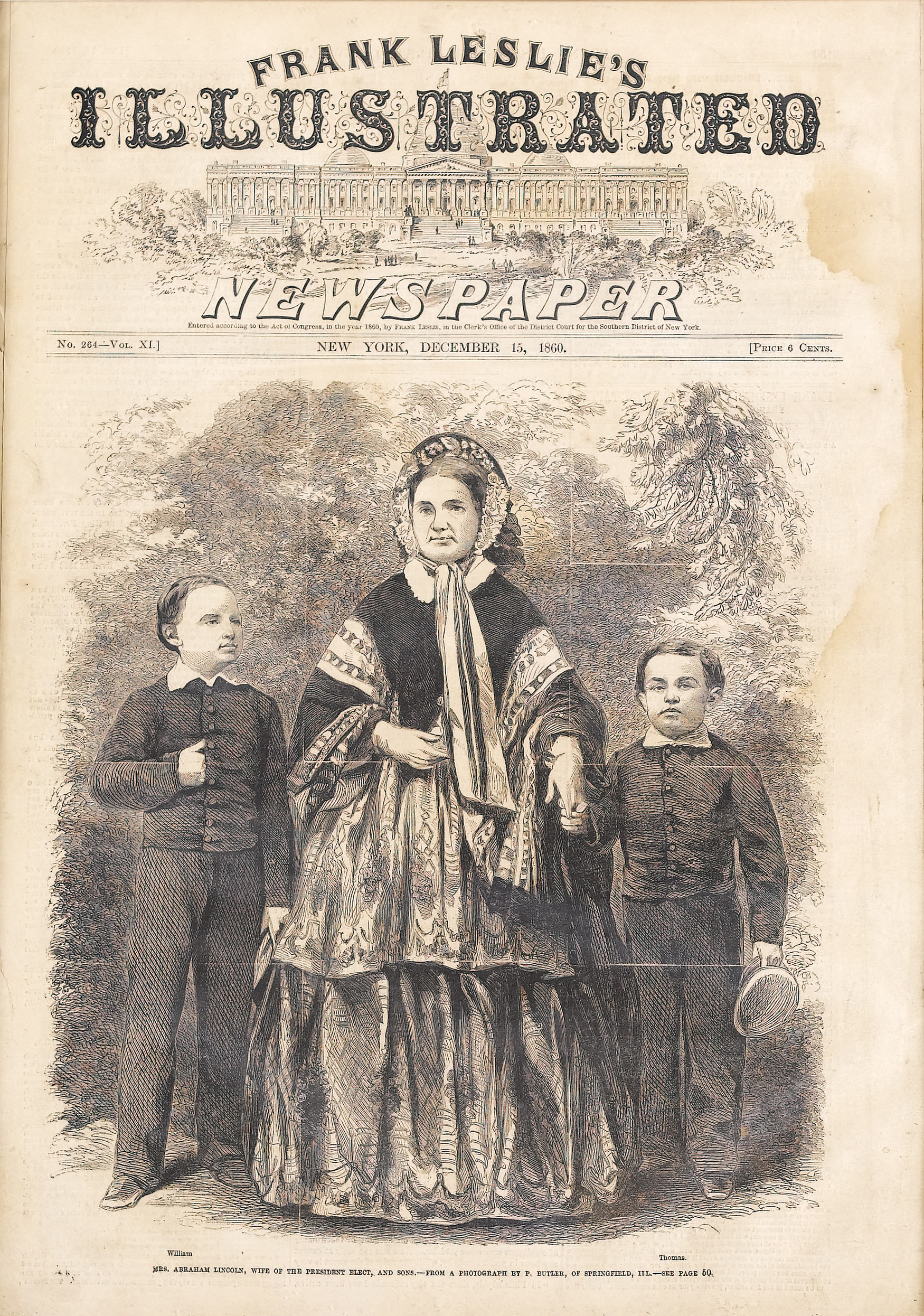
Mary Todd Lincoln with sons William and Tad; steel engraving from photograph (December 15, 1860)

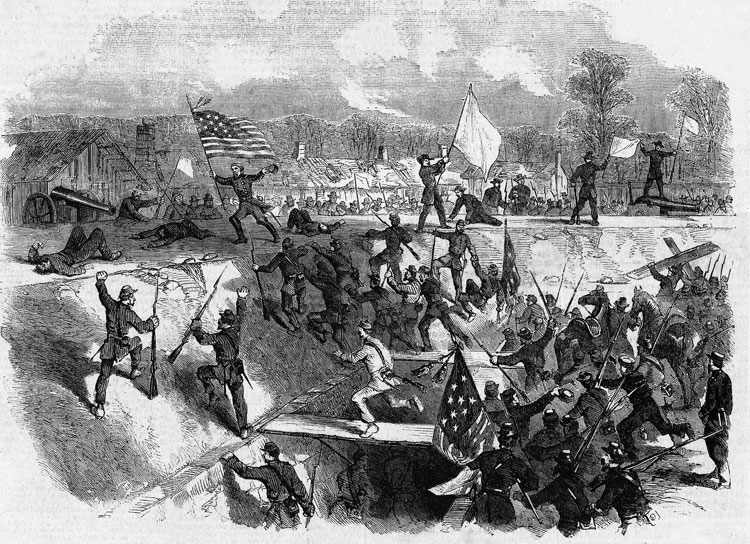
An 1863 lithograph showing General Stephen G. Burbridge planting the Union flag after the capture of Arkansas Post

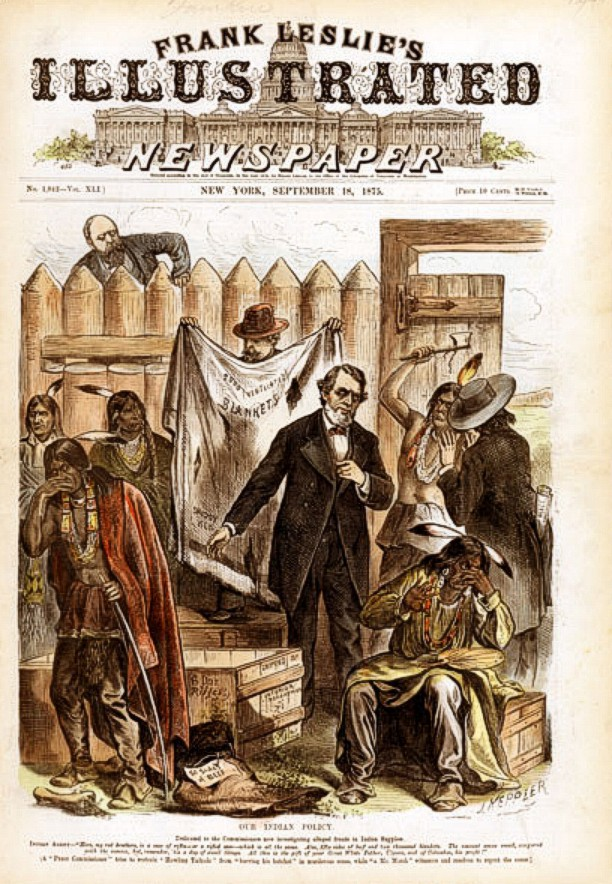
Joseph Keppler Colored lithograph ridiculing U.S. Indian policy (September 18, 1875)

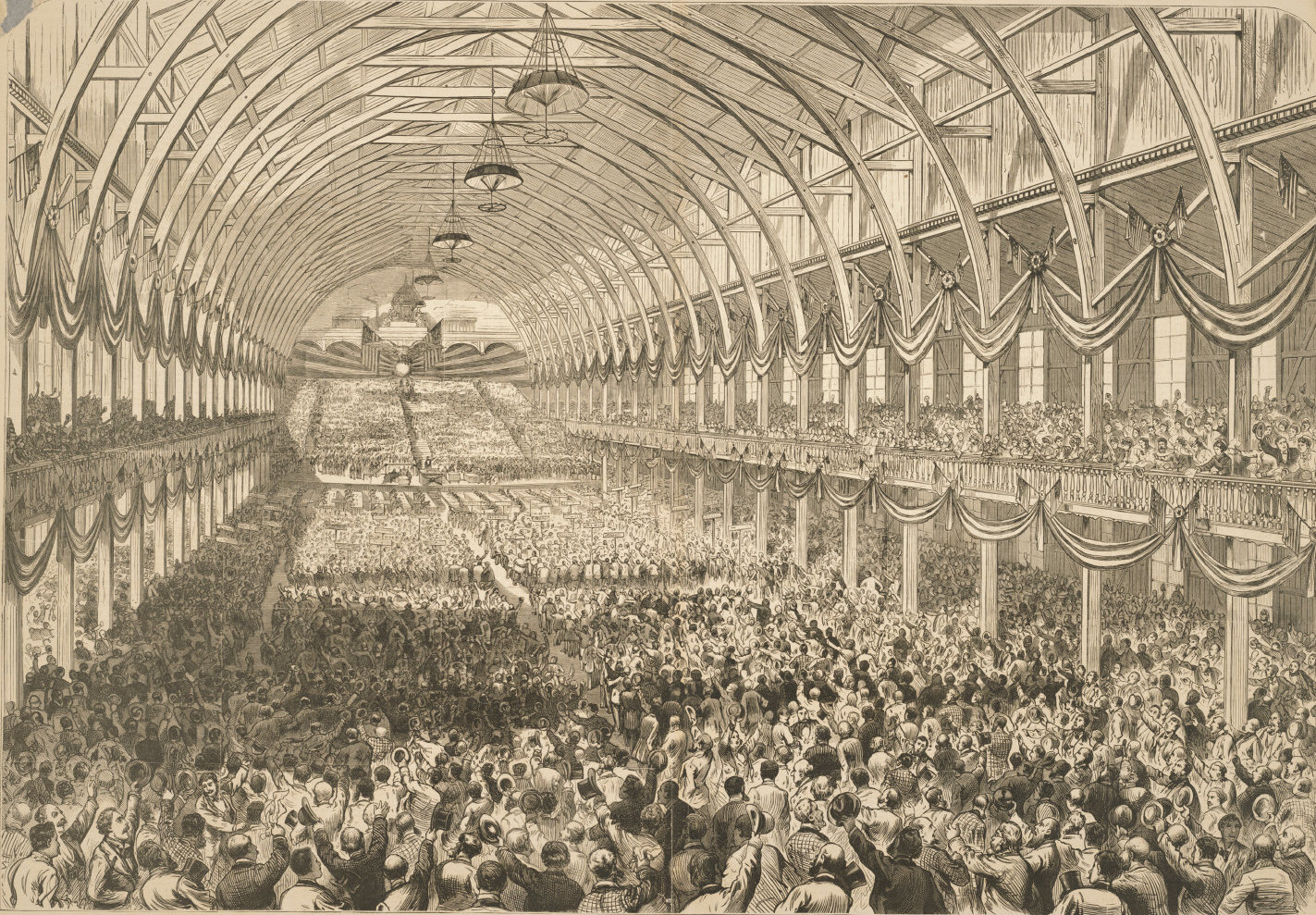
The Republican National Convention at Cincinnati; lithograph likely derived from a photograph (July 1, 1876)

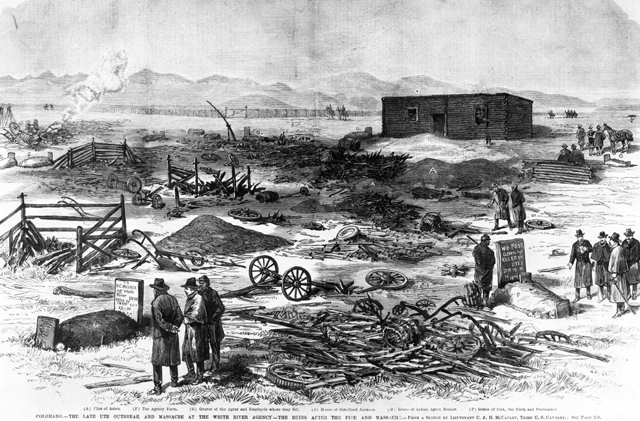
An 1879 lithograph illustration depicting the Meeker Massacre in Colorado

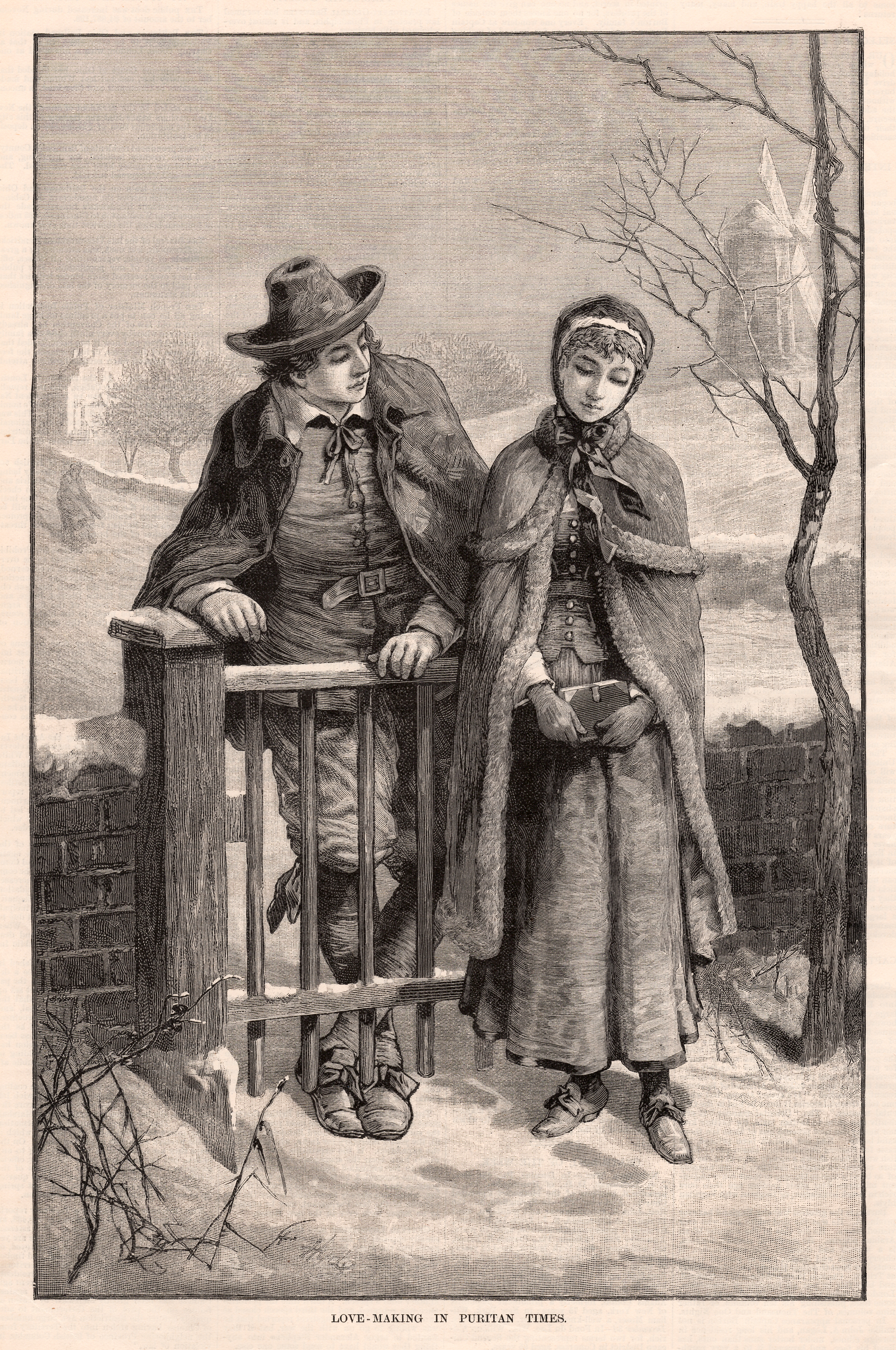
Woodcut of a romantic Puritan couple (December 12, 1885)

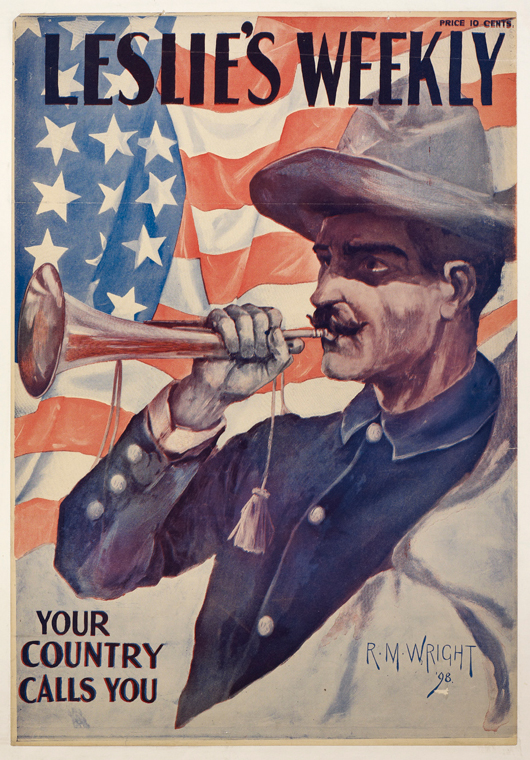
Colored lithograph cover about the Spanish–American War (June 30, 1898)

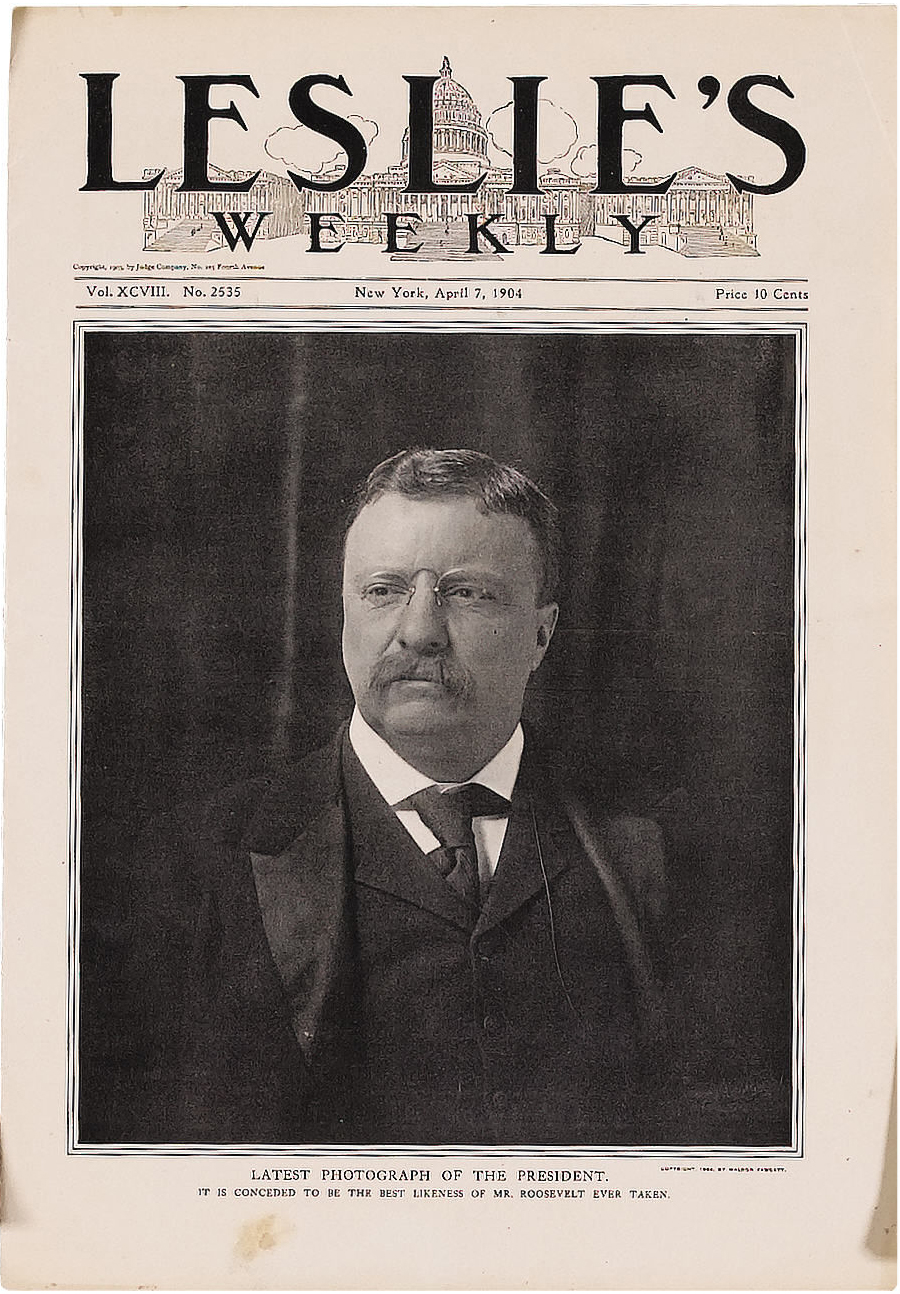
President Theodore Roosevelt; halftone photograph (April 7, 1904)

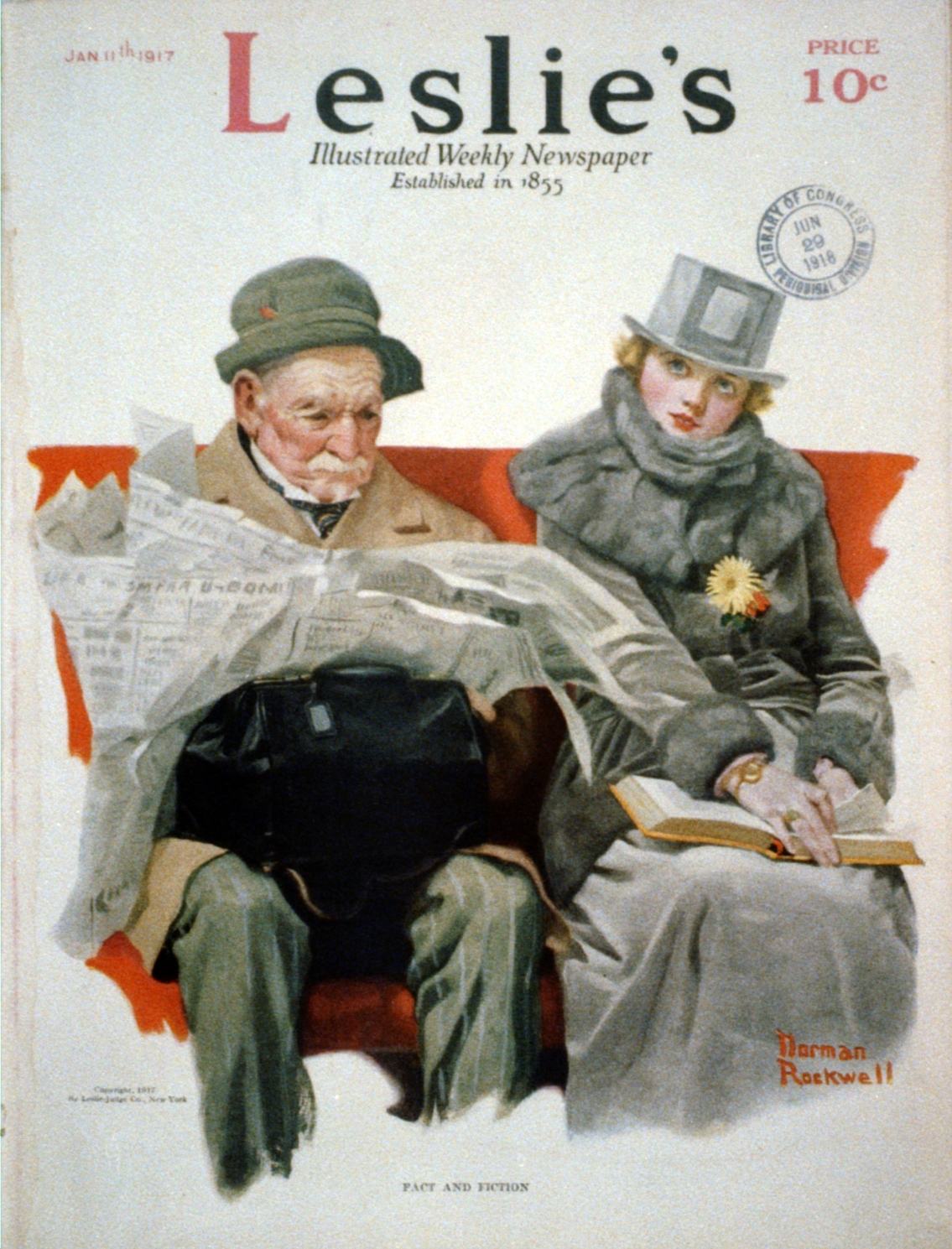
Fact and Fiction by Norman Rockwell (January 11, 1917)

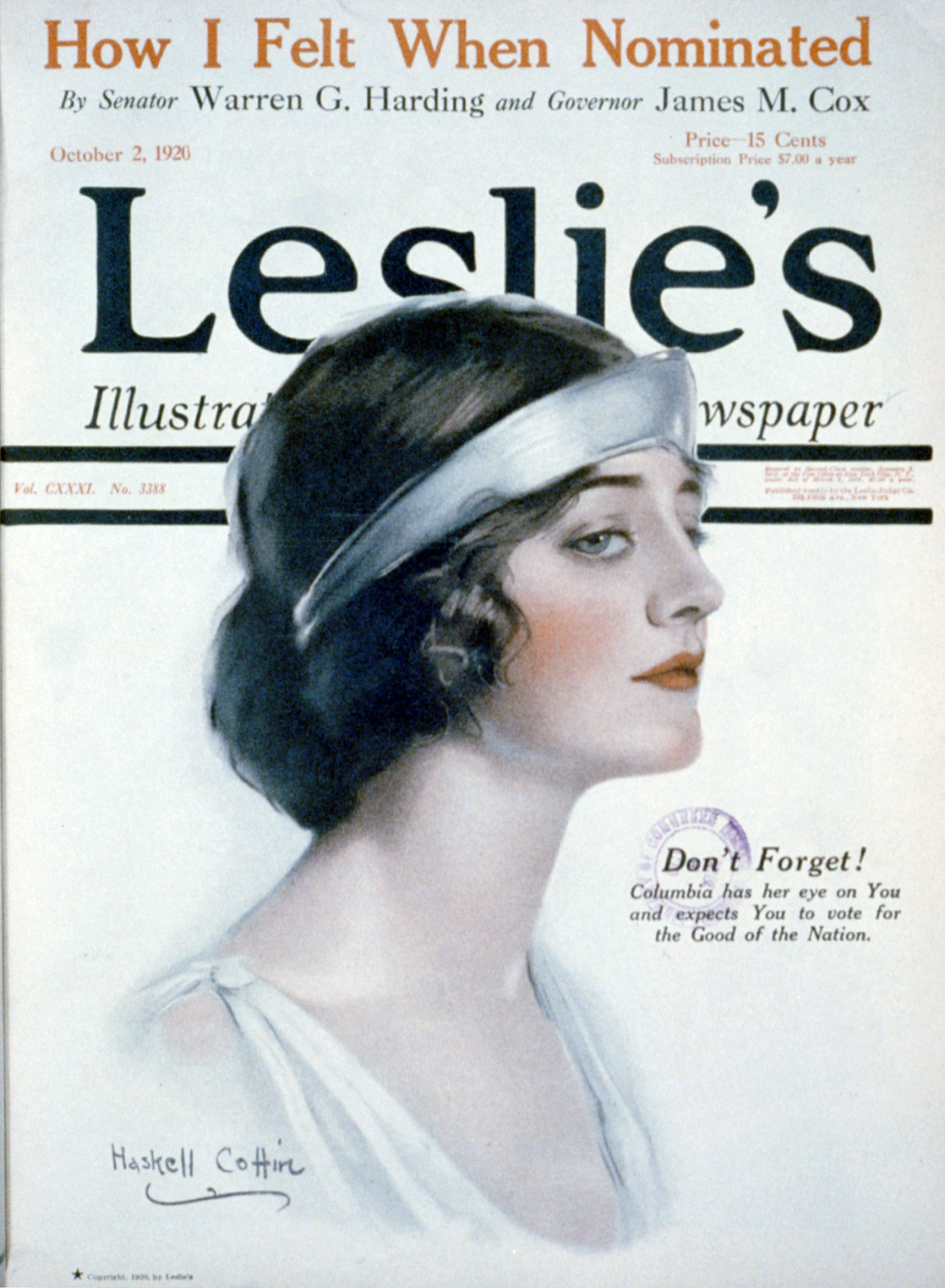
Cover promoting participation in the first presidential election since ratification of the Nineteenth Amendment (October 2, 1920)

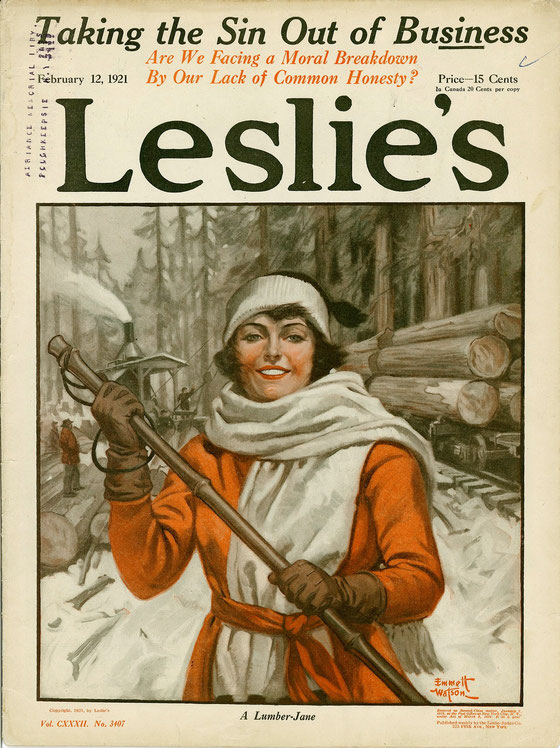
A Lumber-Jane by Emmett Watson (February 12, 1921)
