= Paper popper =

Paper toy

One way of folding a paper popper

A paper popper is a party prank that is commonly used in schools. There are many variations of a paper popper, but they all involve a folded sheet of paper being gripped and thrust down. This causes air to be forced into the paper's folded flaps, making the paper flaps pop out in the opposite direction at a high velocity, then making a loud popping noise. According to popular misconception, the sound is supposed to be caused by the paper breaking the sound barrier. In actuality, what happens is that air rushes in a blast wave to fill the vacuum created in the pocket that opens. The sound is described as the crack of a whip, which is an example of breaking the sound barrier, although the causes are different. Most papers work for poppers, although some are louder and some are quieter than others. Using bigger paper makes it louder and book paper also makes it louder.

== Designs ==
There are many methods of folding paper to create different paper popper designs. A few are shown here.

=== Simple Paper Popper ===
One simple way of folding a paper popper is depicted here. This method only requires 2 folds.

Simple paper popper with two folds

=== Origami Paper Popper ===
An origami-like design is also shown here. This design requires 7 folds.

Origami style of paper popper

== See also ==
- Paper plane
