= Dolly Dimples (comic strip) =

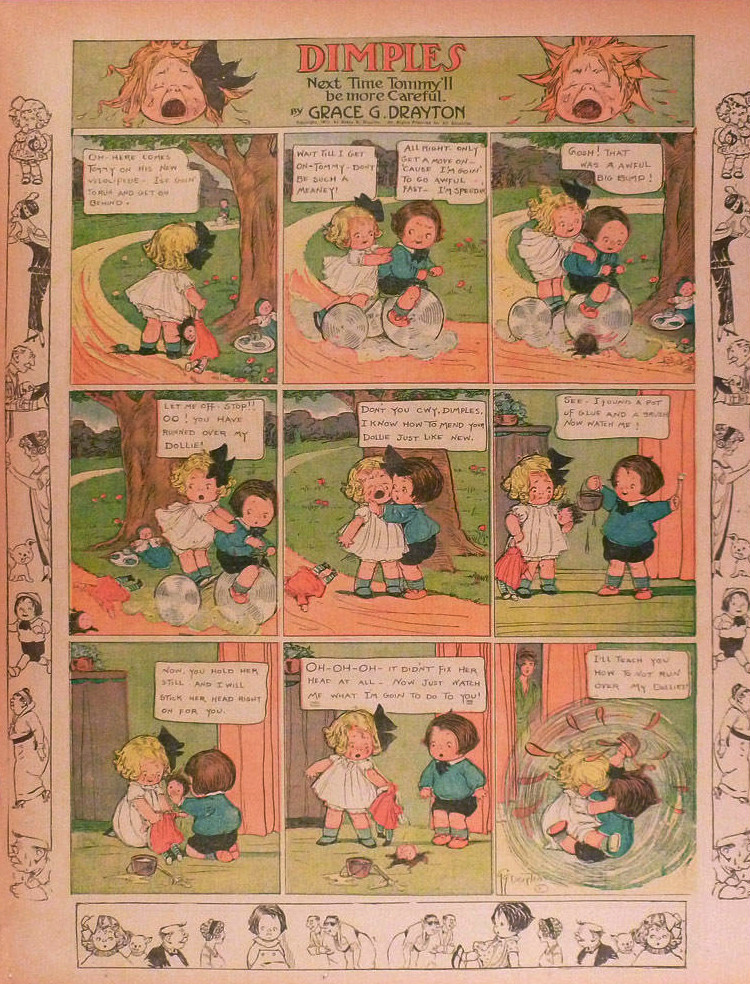
- 1915 Dimples comic strip, showing Dimples and her friend Tommy

Publication information
- Publisher: Hearst (King Features Syndicate)
- First appearance: as "Toodles" (1903) as "Dottie Dimple"" (1908) as "Dimples" (1914) as "Dolly Dimples" (1928)
- Created by: Grace Drayton

In-story information
- Partnerships: Bobby Bounce and Comfy

Dolly Dimples was a syndicated comic strip character created by early American female cartoonist Grace Drayton which appeared in various William Randolph Hearst/King Features Syndicate publications. Over the period 1903 to 1933 the strip's main character was known by the various names "Toodles" (1903–1904), "Dottie Dimple" (1908–1911), "Dimples" (1914–1918), and finally "Dolly Dimples" (1928–1933).

== History ==
King Features' archivist dates the character's debut as March 22, 1903, although at that point she was called Toodles, as part of the strip Naughty Toodles, which ran from 1903 to 1904. An analog character appeared in two non-Hearst strips, The Adventures of Dolly Drake and Bobby Blake in Storyland (Philadelphia Press, 1905–1906) and The Turr’ble Tales of Kaptain Kiddo (1909), both written by Drayton's sister Margaret G. Hays.

As "Dottie Dimple," she next appeared in the Hearst syndicated strip of the same name, which ran from 1908 to 1911. She was again featured in Drayton's strip Dimples which ran with Hearst from January 1914 to 1918.

Finally, the character was part of the King Features strip Dolly Dimples and Bobby Bounce (with the topper strip Kittens), syndicated from 1928 to the Spring of 1933.

== Characterization ==
As described by King Features' archivist, the character "was a little girl who stumbled into mischief around the house or in the vicinity of an adult, who would suffer for it and/or give out a punishment." She was usually accompanied by a little boy and a cute puppy. The archivist explains her appearance in Dolly Dimples and Bobby Bounce: "Dolly was just Toodles/Dollie/Dimples now with a short bob replacing her Goldilocks. Bobby was just Kaptain Kiddo in 1928 style rompers, and they were joined by a fluffy white dog named Comfy, similar to Kiddo’s stalwart sidekick, Puppo, and Dimples little pet, Fido."
