= Margaret G. Hays =

American writer

- Born: Margaret Parker Gebbie; July 3, 1874 Philadelphia, Pennsylvania, U.S.
- Died: September 13, 1925 (aged 51) Philadelphia, Pennsylvania, U.S.
- Area: Cartoonist
- Spouse: Frank A. Hays (m. 1893)
- Children: 2
- Relatives: Grace Drayton (sister)

Margaret G. Hays (née Margaret Parker Gebbie; July 3, 1874 – September 13, 1925) was an American illustrator, cartoonist, and children's author.

== Biography ==
Hays was born Margaret Parker on July 3, 1874, to George, an art publisher, and Mary Jane (née Fitzgerald) Gebbie. She was educated by governesses until the age of 13 when she then attended the Convent of Notre Dame. Hayes worked with her sister, Grace Drayton, on a number of comic strips and children's books, including The Turr’ble Tales of Kaptain Kiddo. Hays created post cards and paper dolls, and while her sister Grace Drayton is best known for creating the Campbells Soup kids, Hays created jingles for Campbells. Hays best known strip is Jennie and Jack, also the Little Dog Jap, a strip that was syndicated in 1908. Along with writing comic strips and children's illustrated books, Hays wrote poetry and was published in a number of magazines.

== Personal life ==
Hays married Frank Allison Hays (1866–1930) in 1893. He was involved in working with the Children's Novelty Company alongside his wife as a place that published paper dolls. She had two children, Mary A. Huber and William Hays; Mary also was a cartoonist. Hays died on September 13, 1925, in Philadelphia, aged 51 years, and is buried at West Laurel Hill Cemetery.

Vegetable verselets for humorous vegetarians

== Legacy ==
A concert of music that included pieces from Hays' Vegetable Verselets for Humorous Vegetarians was performed on April 29, 2012 at Virginia Tech. Inspired by the poem 'Heart-Beets' from the collection, Tracy Cowden – then associate professor of music at Virginia Tech – worked with composer Daron Hagon to set several poems to music, with soprano Caroline Worra enlisted to sing at the concert.
