= Dolly Dimples (Utah) =

1909 publicity stunt in Salt Lake City, Utah, U.S.

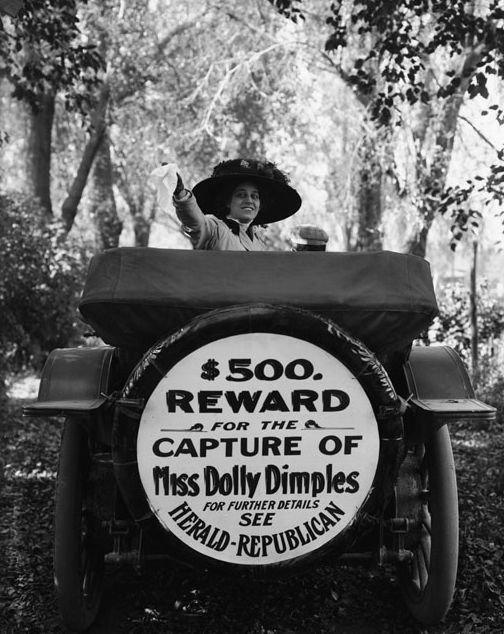

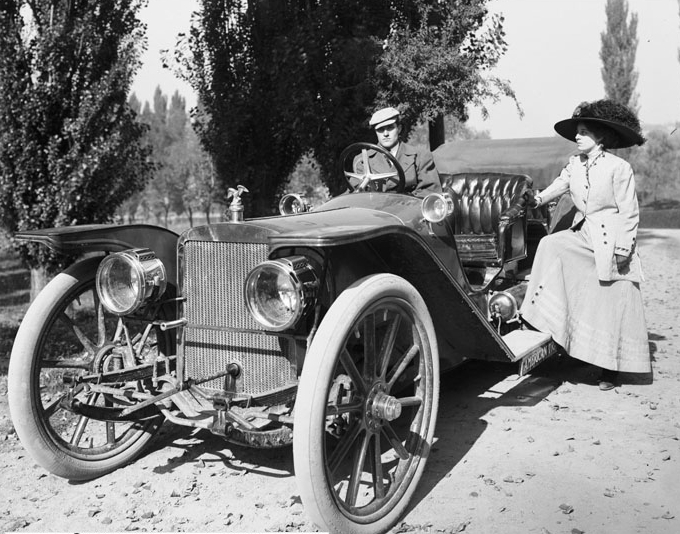
Dolly Dimples in the 1909 American Traveler

Dolly Dimples was a 1909 publicity stunt in Salt Lake City by the (since defunct) Salt Lake Herald-Republican newspaper, involving a pretty girl in a new automobile, in this case an American Traveler. A $500 reward (roughly $25,000 in 2008 dollars) was offered for the "capture" of Miss Dolly Dimples. Miss Dimples was played by a woman identified as Jennie Curry. The contest was eventually accused of being rigged, and Jennie Curry, L. V. Curry, and F. K. Ricker were arrested and returned to Utah on a charge of conspiracy to defraud. They were tried and found not guilty on a technicality.

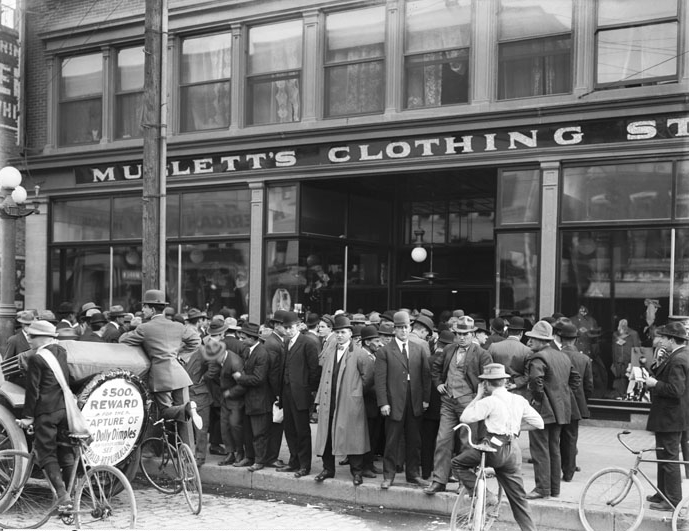
Crowd at Mullett's Store watching for Dolly Dimples, 28 October 1909
