= Celesta Geyer =

Sideshow performer (1901–1982)

- Born: Celesta Herrmann; July 18, 1901; Cincinnati, Ohio, U.S.
- Died: February 19, 1982 (aged 80); Hollywood, Florida, U.S.
- Other name: Dolly Dimples
- Occupations: Circus performer, diet advocate
- Years active: 1927–1982
- Known for: Weighing 555 lbs and losing 440 lbs.

Celesta Geyer (née Herrmann; July 18, 1901 – February 19, 1982) was an American circus performer best known as the fat lady Dolly Dimples, and also billed under the stage names Bonnie Sonora and Jolly Dolly Geyer. She was born in Cincinnati, Ohio.

== Early years ==
Celesta Herrmann was born on July 18, 1901, in Cincinnati, Ohio. Geyer grew up in a German-American family. According to later biographical accounts, she experienced teasing from classmates about her size.

Biographical sources describe her childhood as marked by both social difficulties outside the home and a supportive family environment. Despite her size, Geyer worked a variety of jobs before entering show business, including factory work, selling cosmetics, and working as a manicurist.

== Health ==
By her late twenties, Herrmann weighed approximately 400 pounds (180 kg) when she entered the sideshow. By her forties, Herrmann's weight had reached approximately 555 pounds (252 kg).

According to her later recollections, Herrmann developed a large appetite during childhood and grew up in a household where large meals and frequent snacks were a central part of family life. During her years as "Dolly Dimples", she reportedly consumed approximately 10,000 calories (42,000 kJ) each day, including five pounds of meat, several pounds of potatoes, four loaves of bread, a gallon of milk, and nearly two pounds of sugar, primarily in the form of baked goods and pastries.

By her late forties, Herrmann's weight had begun to affect her health and made touring increasingly difficult. At the age of 49, she survived a near-fatal heart attack.

Following her health scare, Herrmann began a medically supervised 800 calories (3,300 kJ)-per-day diet. In little more than a year, Herrmann reduced her weight by approximately 440 pounds (200 kg), reaching about 112 pounds (51 kg), and maintained her lower weight for the remainder of her life. In later life, Herrmann became an advocate of dieting and exercise.

Herrmann published her autobiography, Diet or Die; The Dolly Dimples Weight Reducing Plan, in 1968. Her weight loss was recognized by the Guinness Book of World Records as the greatest amount of weight lost in the shortest period of time.

== Marriage and family ==
On January 17, 1925, 23-year-old Celesta Herrmann married Frank Geyer. The couple did not have children.

By her late twenties, Herrmann had worked a series of factory and service jobs before she and her husband faced financial hardship when Frank Geyer lost his job at the Ford Motor Company during the early years of the Great Depression. After the couple moved to Detroit, they visited the Happy Land Carnival, where Herrmann met fat lady Jolly Pearl Stanley. Following several days of consideration, Herrmann decided to enter the sideshow business. In 1929, Herrmann, Frank Geyer, and sideshow owner Hymie Wagner developed the stage name "Dolly Dimples", under which she would become nationally known.

Throughout Herrmann's circus career, Frank Geyer accompanied her as her manager and road assistant. The couple toured together for more than two decades before establishing a winter home in Florida, where they spent the off-season. Their home was adapted to accommodate Herrmann's size with oversized furniture and bathroom fixtures, providing a private retreat away from public exhibition. During the winter months, Herrmann supplemented the couple's income by giving psychic readings from her home.

Herrmann and Frank Geyer remained married for 57 years, until Herrmann's death in 1982.

== Circus career ==
Dolly Dimples was billed as "The World's Most Beautiful Fat Lady". Also an accomplished singer and impersonator of celebrities of the day, such as Kate Smith, Dolly's act became a big draw on the sideshow circuit. By the late 1930s she was working for the Ringling Brothers.
