= Grace Drayton =

American illustrator

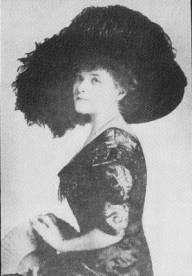
- Born: Grace Gebbie; October 14, 1878 Philadelphia, Pennsylvania, US
- Died: January 31, 1936 (aged 58)
- Areas: Cartoonist, Illustrator
- Pseudonym: Grace G. Wiederseim
- Notable works: Campbell Soup Kids; Dolly Dimples; Dolly Dingle Paper Dolls; The Pussycat Princess
- Spouses: Theodore Wiederseim (m. 1900; div. 1911) W. Drayton (m. 1911; div. 1923)
- Relatives: George and Mary Gebbie (Parents)

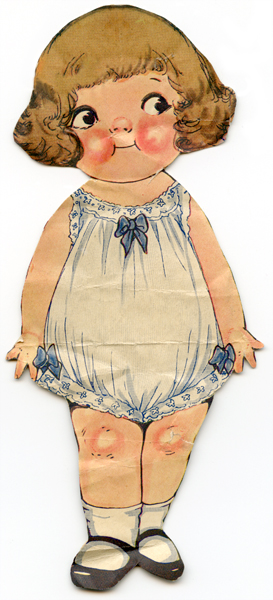
Dolly Dingle

Grace Drayton (née Gebbie, also known as Grace Wiederseim; October 14, 1878 – January 31, 1936) was an illustrator of children's books, fashion pages, and magazine covers. She created the Campbell Soup Kids. She is considered to be one of the first and most successful American female cartoonists.

== Biography ==
Drayton was born Grace Gebbie in 1878 in Philadelphia. Her father, George Gebbie, was an art publisher.

Drayton attended Drexel Institute (now Drexel University) and the Philadelphia School of Design for Women (PSDW). While at PSDW, she was a student of the American artist and teacher Robert Henri during 1893 and 1894. Drayton began her career as a freelance artist in 1895. From 1905 to 1909, she was a member of The Plastic Club, an arts organization in Philadelphia. She created the Campbell Soup Kids which was used in advertisements for Campbell's Soup beginning in 1904. The Campbell Soup Kids and Drayton's other children characters were drawn in a cute cherubic style often with round faces, plump bodies, and rosy cheeks.

With her sister Margaret G. Hays (1874–1925) as writer, Drayton produced The Adventures of Dolly Drake and Bobby Blake in Storyland and The Turr’ble Tales of Kaptin Kiddo in the period 1905–1909. Drayton designed the popular Dolly Dingle paper dolls, which appeared in the women's magazine Pictorial Review.

She also created syndicated newspaper comic strips for Hearst/King Features such as Naughty Toodles, Dottie Dimple, Dimples, Dolly Dimples and Bobby Bounce, and The Pussycat Princess. Drayton was the first woman to be a cartoonist for Hearst. The Pussycat Princess was started in 1935. After Drayton's death in 1936, the strip was continued by Ruth Carroll and Ed Anthony.

== Personal life ==
In 1900 she married Theodore Wiederseim. In 1911, she divorced Wiederseim and married William Drayton and started signing her work as Grace Drayton. She divorced Drayton in 1923. Grace Drayton died in 1936 and is buried at the Holy Cross Cemetery in Yeadon, Pennsylvania.

== Legacy ==
The Campbell Soup Kids were an iconic staple of Campbell's Soup advertising strategy for decades. The Campbell Soup Kids drawings and memorabilia remain popular with antique collectors. It is possible that Drayton's work had some influence on Japanese Shōjo manga in the late 1930s. Drayton's Dolly Dingle dolls are part of the Joseph Downs Collection at the Winterthur Museum, Garden and Library. Some of her work is also part of the collection at The Cartoon Museum.

== Comic strips ==
as Grace G. Wiederseim:

- Toodles / Naughty Toodles / The Strange Adventures of Pussy Pumpkin And Her Chum Toodles! (Hearst, March 22, 1903–January 10, 1904)
- The Adventures of Dolly Drake and Bobby Blake in Storyland (The Philadelphia Press, 1905–1906) — written by Margaret G. Hays
- The Turr’ble Tales of Kaptain Kiddo (Philadelphia North American Company, 1909) — written by Margaret G. Hays
- Dottie Dimple (Hearst, 1908–1911)

as Grace Drayton:

- Dimples (Hearst, January 1914–1918)
- Dolly Dimples and Bobby Bounce (King Features, 1928–Spring 1933) — with topper strip Kittens
- The Pussycat Princess (King Features, 1935–1947) — written by Ed Anthony; art continued by Ruth Carroll after Drayton's 1936 death
