= Sophie Lowe discography =

English-born Australian actress and singer-songwriter

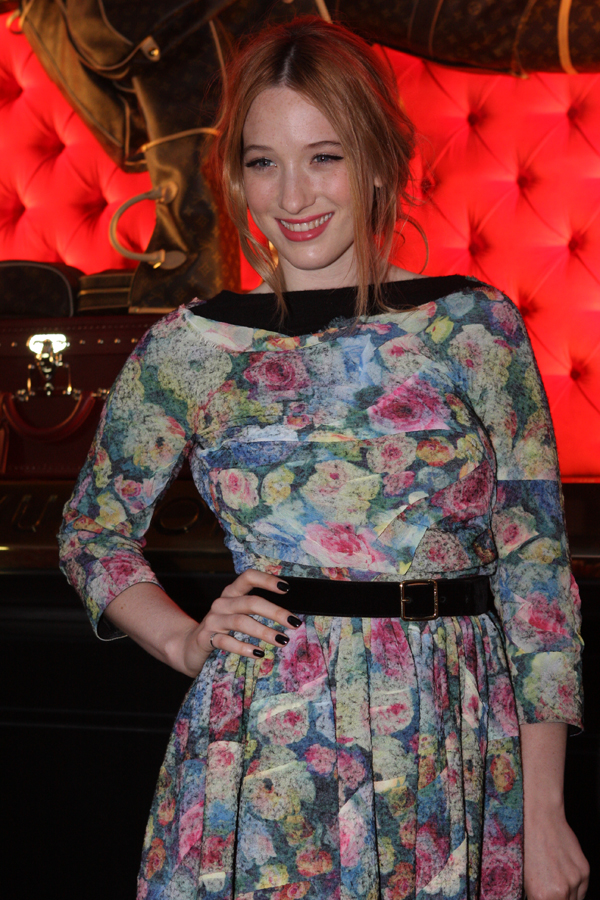
- Lowe at a Louis Vuitton red carpet launch in Sydney, 2011
- EPs: 2
- Singles: 8
- Music videos: 7
- Soundtrack appearances: 3

English-born Australian actress and singer-songwriter Sophie Lowe has released two extended plays (EPs), eight singles and seven music videos.

Lowe self-released her debut EP, EP 1, under the alias SOLO in December 2013 on Bandcamp, she later dropped the SOLO name and performed under her real name and re-released her debut EP on the iTunes Store in October 2015. The lead single of the EP is the song, "Dreaming", with the music video directed by actress Bonnie Wright. The original version of the first track of the EP, "A Runner", was part of the soundtrack of the film, Road Kill, which Lowe co-starred in.

Her second EP, EP 2, was released in November 2015 and included the singles "Understand", "Pink Flowers" and "Breathe".

In August 2016, she released a collaboration with TWINKIDS titled, "Mean" with the music video being directed by Patrick Fileti and herself. In October 2017, she released the single, "Trust". In September 2018. she released the single, "Taught You How To Feel", the music video was directed by Bonnie Wright.

On 11 May 2021, Lowe released the single, "I Don't Want You Around", the music video was directed and edited by herself.

== Extended plays ==
List of extended plays, with selected details
Title	Details	Tracklist
EP 1	Released: 9 October 2015; Original released: December 2013, Bandcamp; Label: Sophie Lowe Self-released; Format: Digital download, streaming	Tracklist: 1. "A Runner"; 2. "Bang Bang"; 3. "Dreaming"; 4. "Please"; 5. "Time Goes By"
EP 2	Released: 26 November 2015; Label: Sophie Lowe Self-released; Format: CD, Digital download, streaming	Tracklist: 1. "Understand"; 2. "Crazy"; 3. "I Don't Know"; 4. "Like I Do You"; 5. "Pink Flowers"; 6. "Breathe"; 7. "Try"

== Singles ==
List of singles as lead artist, showing year released and album name
Title	Year	Album
"Dreaming"	2014	EP 1
"Understand"	2015	EP 2
"Pink Flowers"	2015	EP 2
"Breathe"	2015	EP 2
"Mean" (with TWINKIDS)	2016	Non-album single
"Trust"	2017	Non-album single
"Taught You How To Feel"	2018	Non-album single
"I Don't Want You Around"	2021	TBA
"From the Inside"	2023	TBA

=== Other appearances ===
List of songs which had TV and film soundtrack appearances
Title	Year	TV/Film	Notes
"A Runner" (Original Version)	2010	Road Kill	Track 1 of the film's soundtrack. Lowe also co-stars in the film.
Trust	2018	Charmed	S1- E8: "Bug a Boo"
Trust	2018	The Bold Type	S2- E7: "Betsy"

== Music videos ==
List of music videos, showing year released and directors
Title	Year	Other artist(s)	Director(s)	Ref.
As lead artist
"Dreaming"	2014	None	Bonnie Wright	
"Understand"	2015	None	Dean Francis	
"Pink Flowers"	2015	None	Sophie Lowe Lily Rolfe	
"Mean"	2016	TWINKIDS	Patrick Fileti Sophie Lowe	
"Taught You How To Feel"	2018	None	Bonnie Wright	
"I Don't Want You Around"	2021	None	Sophie Lowe	
"From the Inside"	2023	None	Clare Hoey	
Guest appearances
"Never Be like You"	2016	Flume Kai	Clemens Habicht	
