= Adoration (2013 film) =

Adoration (Adore)
- Australian release poster
- Directed by: Anne Fontaine
- Written by: Christopher Hampton
- Based on: The Grandmothers by Doris Lessing
- Produced by: Philippe Carcassonne; Michel Feller; Barbara Gibbs; Dominique Besnehard
- Starring: Naomi Watts; Robin Wright
- Cinematography: Christophe Beaucarne
- Edited by: Luc Barnier; Ceinwen Berry
- Music by: Christopher Gordon; Antony Partos
- Production companies: Hopscotch Films; Remstar
- Distributed by: Gaumont (France); Paramount Pictures (United States)
- Release dates: 18 January 2013 (Sundance); 3 April 2013 (France); 14 November 2013 (Australia)
- Running time: 111 minutes
- Countries: Australia; France
- Language: English
- Budget: $16 million
- Box office: $674,982 (Under the title Adore) $1,886,042 (Under the title Two Mothers) $2,561,024 (Total)

Adoration (known in North America and the U.K. as Adore and in France as Perfect Mothers) is a 2013 drama film directed by Anne Fontaine. It is Fontaine's first English-language film. It stars Naomi Watts, Robin Wright, Ben Mendelsohn, Xavier Samuel, and James Frecheville. It is based on a 2003 novella by British writer Doris Lessing called The Grandmothers.

The plot follows a pair of middle-aged women who are life-long friends and have sex with each other's teenage sons, and the resultant emotional consequences of their ongoing affairs.

The film premiered at the 2013 Sundance Film Festival under its original title Two Mothers.

== Plot ==
In New South Wales, childhood friends Roz and Lil and their families are next door neighbors. Roz's son Tom and Lil's son Ian, who are both 18, are also best friends, and the four spend all their time together.

Roz's husband Harold is offered a job in Sydney, so goes there to make arrangements, although Roz does not want to move. That night, Ian kisses her, and although she hesitates briefly, they ultimately have sex. Tom witnesses Roz leaving Ian's room. Confused and frustrated, he tries to seduce Lil, but she pushes him away and he tells her what he saw. That night, he stays at her's again and they have sex.

Roz finds Lil at work and they talk about their involvement with each other's sons. Both agree that they have apparently crossed the line by getting intimate with Ian and Tom, acknowledging that it should never happen again. Meeting with both of their sons, they affirm they must stop.

However, Ian still has romantic feelings towards Roz so eventually, they resume the relationship, later learning Lil and Tom never stopped sleeping together. The women, admitting they are happy, agree to keep going. Upon Harold's return, Roz declares that neither she nor Tom will move with him to Sydney.

Two years later, Roz and Harold are divorced, and their secret affairs have continued. Ian now works with his mother for a successful yacht-building company and Tom is studying theater. Harold convinces Tom to direct a play in Sydney, so he stays with him and his new family.

While in Sydney, Tom meets Mary, who gets the lead role. They begin a romantic relationship, so Lil reluctantly accepts he has moved on. Roz and Ian are still lovers, although she believes he will not be attracted to her for much longer. Finally, she ends their relationship. Upset, Ian angrily storms out.

Sometime later, Tom marries Mary. At the wedding, Ian meets Hannah, having sex with her to get back at Roz. That same night, he comes to Roz', begging to be let in, but Roz refuses. Crying quietly in her room, she regrets ending their relationship as she still has feelings for him. He goes surfing, suffering a broken leg in the process.

Despite his injury, Ian refuses to see Roz, but Hannah visits, later nursing him through physical therapy. They begin a romantic relationship, but when he and Tom meet up for lunch, he says it is going nowhere, so plans to break it off. However, Hannah soon tells him she is pregnant.

Years later, Ian and Tom are now both married and have daughters, named Shirley and Alice. Mary and Hannah, Tom and Ian's wives respectively, are ignorant of the previous romantic relationships. After they all spend the day together at the beach, while most are in the water, Ian and Roz share a quiet moment. That night, after having dinner together, the drunk Tom goes for a walk to clear his head.

Ian follows Tom and sees him having sex with Lil, realizing their affair has never ended, despite Tom's marriage to Mary. Enraged, he impulsively reveals the truth to both Mary and Hannah. Both are horrified and leave with their children, definitively cutting all connections with Ian, Lil, Roz and Tom.

Although Ian's romantic relationship with Roz had ended long before marrying Hannah, his lack of transparency is seen as a form of betrayal. This is despite the fact that he had never actually cheated on her during their marriage.

When Tom later returns, he finds Roz sitting alone. She tells him Mary's declaration, that they will never return. Lil tearfully insists she and Tom had tried to stop, but could not keep away from each other, ultimately rekindling their romantic relationship shortly after Mary and Tom's wedding. But Roz stays silent.

Time passes, and Ian swims to the free-floating dock, the same one where he first flirted with Roz and where Roz and Lil used to swim to as girls. He climbs up, seeing that Tom, Lil and Roz are there. Greeting them all, he lies down beside Roz. It is implied that, Ian, Roz, Tom and Lil have again resumed their romantic relationships, but this time for good.

== Cast ==
- Naomi Watts as Lil Weston, Roz's best friend, Theo's widow, Ian's mother, Tom's lover, Hannah's estranged mother-in-law and Shirley's grandmother.
- Robin Wright as Roz, Lil's best friend, Harold's ex-wife, Tom's mother, Ian's lover, Mary's estranged mother-in-law and Alice's grandmother.
- Ben Mendelsohn as Harold, Roz's ex-husband, Tom's father, Mary's father-in-law and Alice's grandfather.
- Xavier Samuel as Ian Weston, Theo and Lil's son, Tom's best friend, Roz's lover, Hannah's estranged husband and Shirley's father.
- James Frecheville as Tom, Harold and Roz's son, Ian's best friend, Lil's lover, Mary's estranged husband and Alice's father.
- Jessica Tovey as Mary, Tom's estranged wife, Roz's estranged daughter-in-law and Alice's mother.
- Sophie Lowe as Hannah Weston, Ian's estranged wife, Lil's estranged daughter-in-law and Shirley's mother.
- Gary Sweet as Saul
- Rowan Witt as Oswald
- Matt Levett as Workshop Performer

== Reception ==
=== Critical response ===
The film has received mostly negative reviews. Of 75 reviews counted by Rotten Tomatoes, 33% were positive, with a rating average of 4.70/10. The site's consensus reads: "Naomi Watts and Robin Wright give it their all, but they can't quite make Adore's trashy, absurd plot believable." Metacritic counted 24 reviews with an average score of 37/100, indicating "generally unfavorable reviews".

The Guardian's Damon Wise, in a positive review that awarded the film four out of five stars, wrote the film is "An incredibly provocative piece of work, featuring a brave and vulnerable performance by Naomi Watts (who seems perhaps a little too young) and a career-high acting masterclass from Robin Wright (who is cast perfectly)."

=== Accolades ===
Adoration was nominated for the following awards:

Award	Category	Nominee	Result
AACTA Awards (3rd)	Best Adapted Screenplay	Christopher Hampton	Nominated
AACTA Awards (3rd)	Best Production Design	Annie Beauchamp	Nominated
AACTA Awards (3rd)	Best Costume Design	Joanna Mae Park	Nominated
AACTA Awards (3rd)	Best Actress in a Leading Role	Naomi Watts	Nominated
FCCA Awards	Best Actress	Naomi Watts	Won

== Production ==
Adoration was filmed in New South Wales. The houses and main beach scenes were filmed at Seal Rocks, with some beach scenes filmed at Sugarloaf Point Lighthouse beach. Scenes for where the characters worked were filmed at Shelly Beach and the pub scenes were filmed in Balmain. Parts of the film were also shot in Sydney.
