= About Scout =

- Directed by: Laurie Weltz
- Written by: Laurie Weltz
- Produced by: Beverley A. Gordon; Nic Emiliani; Dwjuan Fox
- Starring: India Ennenga; James Frecheville; Nikki Reed; Danny Glover; Ellen Burstyn
- Cinematography: Austin F. Schmidt
- Edited by: Jim Mol
- Production companies: BrownBag Pictures; Decipher Entertainment
- Distributed by: Reel Red Films; Breaking Glass Pictures
- Release dates: April 25, 2015 (Newport Beach Film Festival); March 11, 2016 (United States)
- Country: United States
- Language: English

About Scout (originally titled Scout) is a 2015 American comedy-drama film directed and written by Laurie Weltz. The film stars India Ennenga, James Frecheville, Nikki Reed, Danny Glover and Ellen Burstyn. The film had its world premiere at the Newport Beach Film Festival on April 25, 2015. It was scheduled to be released on March 11, 2016, in a limited release and through video on demand by Breaking Glass Pictures and Reel Red Films.

== Premise ==
A 15-year-old girl named Scout (India Ennenga), travels with a suicidal man Sam (James Frecheville), to find her young little sister Lulu (Onata Aprile) whilst avoiding Child and Teen Services (Danny Glover).

== Cast ==
- India Ennenga as Scout Havers
- James Frecheville as Sam Prescott
- Nikki Reed as Georgie
- Danny Glover as "Red" Freston
- Ellen Burstyn as Gram
- Jane Seymour as Gloria Prescott
- Tim Guinee as Ray
- Onata Aprile as Tallulah "Lulu" Havers'
- Shelley Hennig as Melinda
- Kevin Scott Allen as Ride Operator

== Production ==
On October 7, 2013, it was announced that Laurie Weltz would be directing a film "Scout", which Beverley A. Gordon, Nic Emiliani and Dwjuan Fox would produce. While the film's stars would be India Ennenga, Nikki Reed, Danny Glover, Ellen Burstyn, James Frecheville, Onata Aprile and Shelley Hennig. On October 28, Jane Seymour and Tim Guinee joined the cast of the film. BrownBag Pictures and Decipher Entertainment would handle finance and production.

=== Filming ===
The filming began in October 2013 in Los Angeles, Reed was spotted there filming some scenes.

== Release ==
The film had its world premiere at the Newport Beach Film Festival on April 25, 2015. In November 2015, it was announced that Reel Red Films and Breaking Glass Pictures had acquired U.S distribution rights to the film, with a planned March 2016 release. The film was scheduled to be released on March 11, 2016, in a limited release and through video on demand.
