= Sun Belt Express =

- Official poster
- Directed by: Evan Buxbaum
- Written by: Evan Buxbaum; Chance Mullen; Gregorio Castro
- Produced by: Francile Albright; Pierce Berolzheimer; Iyabo Boyd; Evan Buxbaum; Arun Kumar; Noah Lang; Chance Mullen; Jake Pokluda; Joseph Schick; Adrienne Weiss
- Starring: India Ennenga; Tate Donovan; Rachael Harris; Miguel Sandoval; Stephen Lang; Ana de la Reguera
- Cinematography: Luke Geissbuhler
- Edited by: Beth Moran
- Production companies: Lola's Productions; RGB Media; Theatre In A Trunk
- Distributed by: Marvista Entertainment
- Release date: June 11, 2014 (Champs-Elysees Film Festival)
- Running time: 91 minutes
- Country: United States
- Languages: English; Spanish

Sun Belt Express is a 2014 American independent comedy-drama film, written by Evan Buxbaum, Chance Mullen, and Gregorio Castro, and directed by Evan Buxbaum. Starring Tate Donovan, Rachael Harris, Ana de la Reguera, India Ennenga, Miguel Sandoval, and Stephen Lang, the project had its world premiere on June 11, 2014, at the Champs-Elysees Film Festival.

== Plot ==
Former ethics Professor Allen King (Tate Donovan) has some problems. After being terminated for plagiarizing the work of a student, he hits a personal rock bottom. To survive and get the cash he needs to cover his ex-wife Margaret's (Rachael Harris) expenses, he ends up shuttling illegal immigrants across the border and into Arizona from Mexico. On his most recent trip, he is accompanied by his pregnant Mexican girlfriend Anna (Ana de la Reguera) and his teenage daughter Emily (India Ennenga). While still south of the US border and with three undocumented immigrants supplied by human trafficker Ramon Velazquez (Miguel Sandoval) stuffed in the trunk of the car, the party crosses paths with crooked US Border Patrol officers Rick (Stephen Lang) and Cass (Michael Sirow).

== Cast ==
- Tate Donovan as Allen King
- Rachael Harris as Margaret King
- Ana de la Reguera as Ana
- India Ennenga as Emily King
- Miguel Sandoval as Ramon Velazquez
- Stephen Lang as Border Patrol Officer Rick
- Oscar Avila as Rafi
- Michael Sirow as Border Patrol Officer Cass
- Robert Buxbaum as Pat
- Greg Eichman as Jack
- Mario Moreno as Julian
- Chance Mullen as Josh
- James Ning as Wei
- Lisa Radecki as Professor
- Emma E. Ramos as Emma
- Brenden Wedner as Jimmy
- Arturo Castro as Miguel
- Deborah Chavez as Miguel's Mother

== Production ==
The project filmed for almost a month in 2012 at New Mexico locations in Belen, Los Lunas, Socorro and Albuquerque, with some financing obtained through crowdfunding campaigns at IndieGoGo and Kickstarter. In July 2012, Indiewire listed the project as its "Project of the Day".

== Release ==
The film had its world premiere on June 11, 2014, at the Champs-Elysees Film Festival. and its New Mexico premiere October 18, 2014 at the Santa Fe Independent Film Festival.

Marvista Entertainment obtained United States and Latin American rights to distribute the film, which they have slated for a release through video on demand for on August 18, 2015.

== Reception ==
The Hollywood Reporter praised the film and wrote it was "a rough-and-tumble but occasionally very funny indie comedy".

== Awards and nomination ==
- 2013, while in post-production received 'US In Progress' award at the American Film Festival in Wroclaw, Poland
- 2014, Audience Award Nomination as 'Best American Feature Film' at Champs-Elysees Film Festival
- 2014, Won 'The Grand Prix Award: Dramatic' at Chelsea Film Festival
- 2015, Won 'Festival Award - Best Actor' for Tate Donovan at Chelsea Film Festival
- 2015, Won 'Festival Award - Best Actress'for India Ennenga at Chelsea Film Festival
- 2015, Won 'Festival Award - Best Supporting Actress' for Ana de la Reguera at Chelsea Film Festival
- 2014, nominated for 'New Visions Award - Main Feature Film Award' at Bahamas International Film Festival
- 2015, Won 'Outstanding Achievement in Filmmaking - Editing' for Beth Moran at Newport Beach Film Festival
