= Seal Rocks, New South Wales =

Seal Rocks
- Suburb
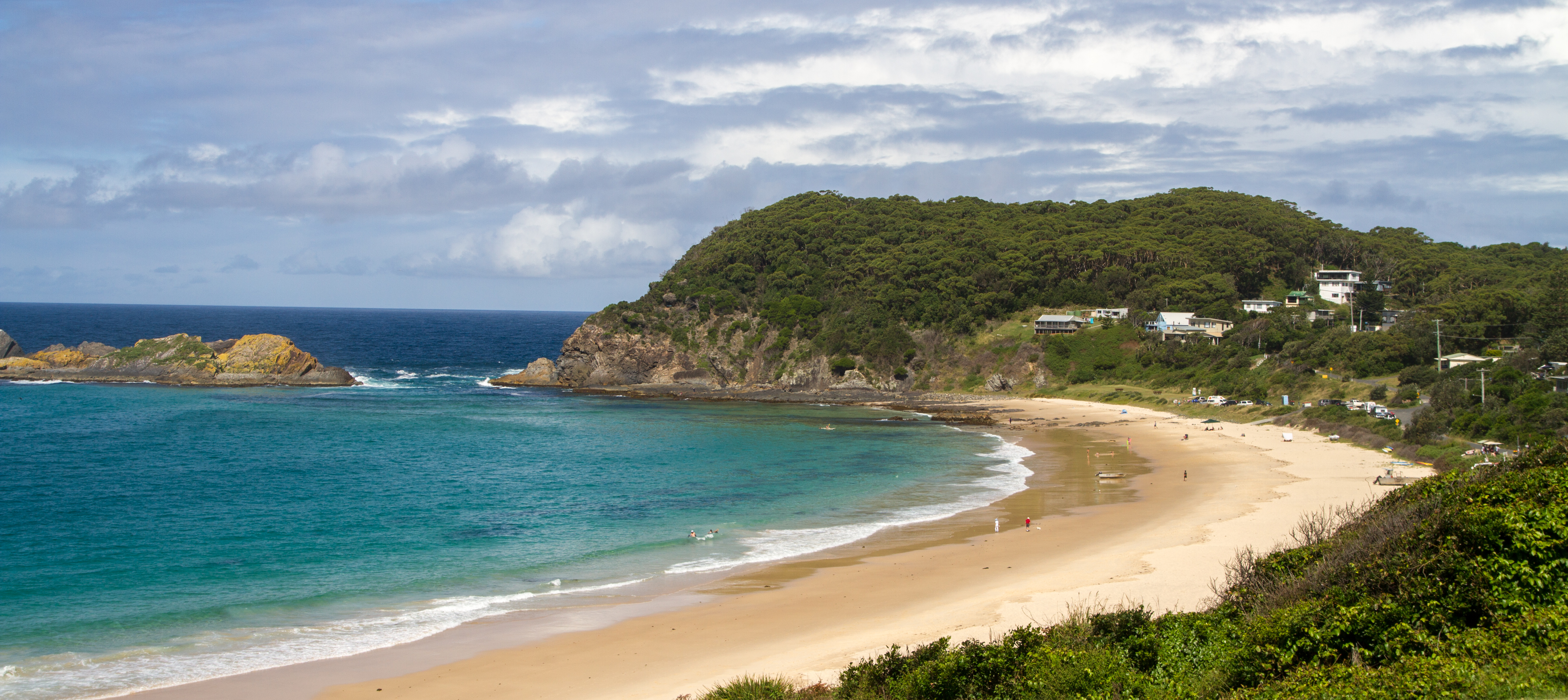
- Seal Rocks beach

- Coordinates: 32°25′13″S 152°30′27″E
- Country: Australia
- State: New South Wales
- Region: Mid North Coast
- LGA: Mid-Coast Council
- Location: 275 km (171 mi) NNE of Sydney; 46.6 km (29.0 mi) SSE of Tuncurry; 107 km (66 mi) SSE of Taree; 136 km (85 mi) NNE of Newcastle

Government
  - State electorate: Myall Lakes
  - Federal division: Lyne

Population
  - Total: 56 (2021) ^{Note1}
- Time zone: UTC+10 (AEST)
  - Summer (DST): UTC+11 (AEDT)
- Postcode: 2423
- County: Gloucester
- Parish: Forster
Suburbs around Seal Rocks
Bungwahl, Smith's Lake	Smith's Lake	Tasman Sea
Bungwahl, Yagon	Seal Rocks	Tasman Sea
Yagon	Tasman Sea	Tasman Sea

Seal Rocks is a small coastal settlement in the Mid-Coast Council local government area, in the Mid North Coast region of New South Wales, Australia, 275 kilometres (171 mi) north-north-east of Sydney. It is famous for its many premier surfing beaches (including Lighthouse Beach, Treachery and Yagon), and also for being the home of Seal Rocks lighthouse, officially known as Sugarloaf Point Lighthouse. At the 2021 census, the area had a population of 56 persons.

== History ==
Prior to European settlement, the area that is now Seal Rocks was occupied by the Worimi Aboriginal people

On 2 June 1864, the Rainbow was wrecked on Seal Rocks.

The Sugarloaf Point Light was installed and lit on 1 December 1875. In 1923, the lighthouse converted from kerosene to acetylene gas. The lighthouse was electrified in June 1966. By 1987, the lighthouse had been automated and no longer required staffed keepers.

In 1895 the SS Catterthun, heading for China from Sydney, was wrecked on the rocks and 54 (31?) passengers and crew drowned.

In 1945 the former Dutch submarine HMAS K9 was lost near the lighthouse. It was discovered in 1999 and has been designated a heritage site.

== Heritage listings ==
Seal Rocks has a number of heritage-listed sites, including:

- Seal Rocks Road, Myall Lakes National Park: Sugarloaf Point Light

== Resistance to commercialisation ==
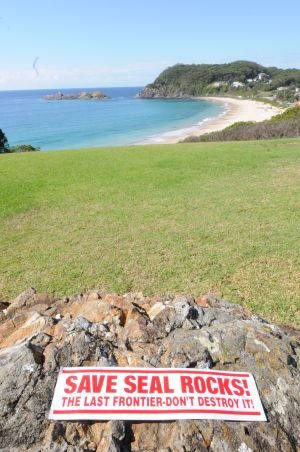
Save Seal Rocks slogan

Seal Rocks is well known for its peaceful resistance to attempts by developers to commercialise the small picturesque fishing village. On entering the town by the road, the slogan "Save Seal Rocks The Last Frontier" can be seen painted on the road itself, this has been continually repainted for over 30 years. Currently the local council is making an attempt to commercialise the small caravan park, and a movement is once again growing against this.

The 2013 movie Adore was filmed at this location.

== Seal colony ==
Seal Rocks was named after the Australian fur seals that were often seen on the rocks near the Sugarloaf Point Lighthouse. There is some evidence that a breeding colony of seals once existed at Seal Rocks, although the species no longer breeds in NSW and the colony was lost. However, more recently sightings have been increasing in the Port Stephens area.

== Sugarloaf Point Lighthouse ==
The construction of Sugarloaf Lighthouse was completed in 1875, ten years after it was recommended a light be placed to highlight the treacherous Seal Rocks. It was originally intended to place the light on Seal Rocks but landing was difficult and so the proposition was abandoned.

The tower is constructed of brick, rendered and painted white. Also constructed were three adjoining cottages, various outbuildings, the construction of the road from Bungwahl, and a 460-metre (1,509 ft) long jetty which was used to land some 1,829 tonnes (1,800 long tons) of building supplies and materials.

The light was upgraded in 1923 and was converted from kerosene to acetylene gas. Electricity was introduced in 1966 and the light was kept staffed for many years despite automation in 1987.

The Sugarloaf lighthouse is the second-most easterly one in Australia, after the Byron Bay lighthouse, and offers accommodation in three cottages.

One of Australia's biggest shipping disasters occurred off Sugarloaf Point; the wreck of the SS Catterthun in 1895 when bound from Sydney to China with the loss of thirty one lives. Although some reports state that 54 persons lost their lives, the NSW marine board of inquiry listed 31 as the correct number.
