= James Frecheville =

Australian actor

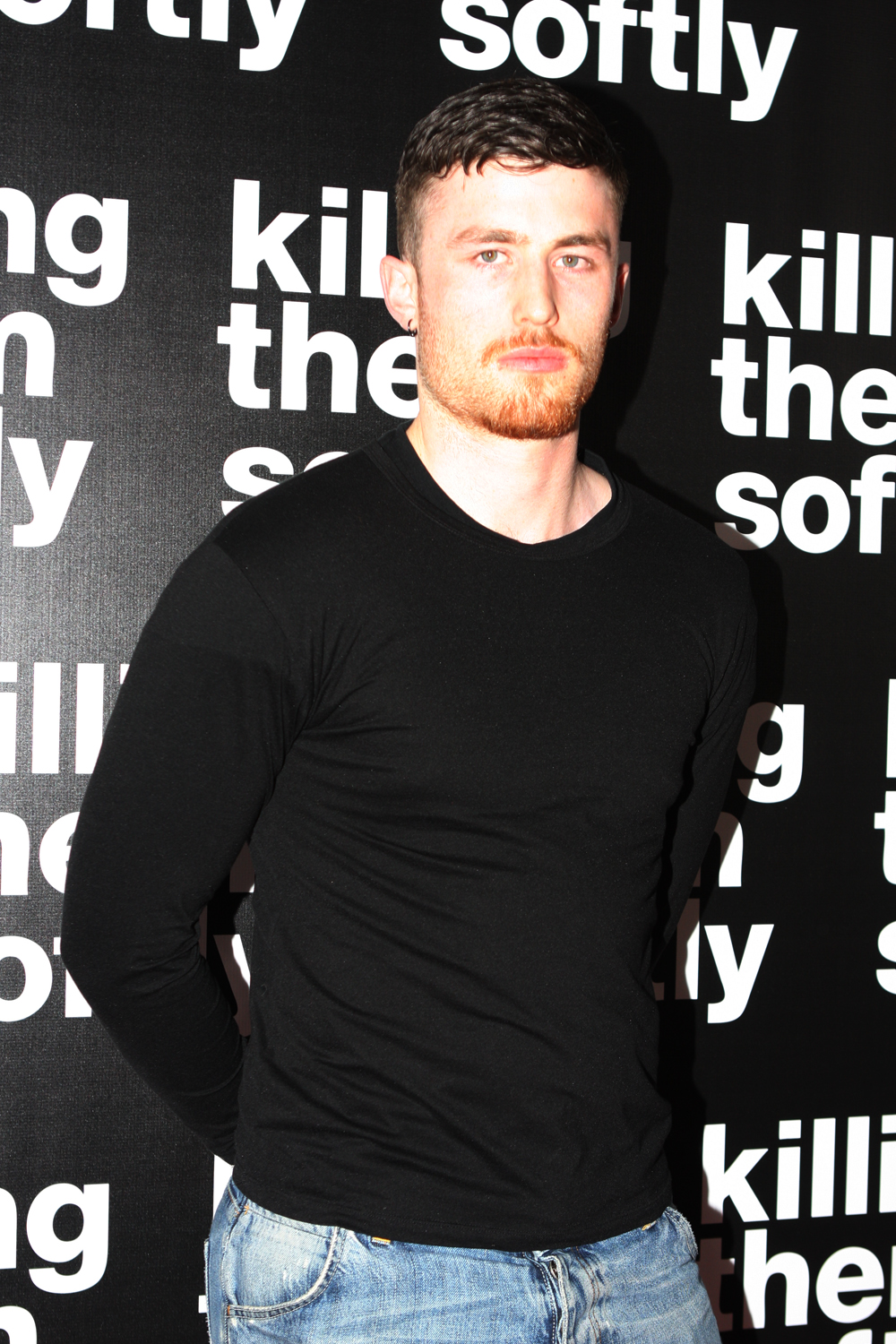
- Frecheville at the Sydney premiere of Killing Them Softly in September 2012
- Born: James Aitken Frecheville; 1991 or 1992; Melbourne, Victoria, Australia
- Education: McKinnon Secondary College; The Australian Film & Television Academy (TAFTA)
- Occupation: Actor
- Years active: 2008–present
- Known for: Animal Kingdom (2010); Adoration (2013)

James Aitken Frecheville (/ˈfrɛʃvɪl/;) is an Australian actor. Following his film debut in the crime drama film Animal Kingdom (2010), Frecheville subsequently appeared in films such as Adoration (2013), The Drop (2014), I.T. (2016), Black '47 (2018), The Royal Hotel (2023). He is also known for his roles as Nick on the BBC One supernatural thriller miniseries Requiem (2018) and Major Bill Veal on the Apple TV+ war drama miniseries Masters of the Air (2024).

== Early life and education ==
James Aitken Frecheville was born in Melbourne. He graduated from McKinnon Secondary College in 2009.

Frecheville was involved with various youth theatre groups before starting work as an extra on the Australian television series City Homicide. He then completed a course at TAFTA.

== Career ==
Frecheville made his film debut in the crime drama film Animal Kingdom, after auditioning for the central role of "J" at age 17. At the 2010 Sundance Film Festival, The Hollywood Reporter described Frecheville as "a brilliant casting choice".

In preparation for his role in the 2018 film Black '47, Frecheville had to learn the Irish language. In an interview, he discussed the challenges of playing an Irish character and filming in Connemara.

== Filmography ==
=== Film ===
| Year | Title | Role | Notes |
|---|---|---|---|
| 2010 | Animal Kingdom | Joshua "J" Cody | |
| 2012 | The First Time | Ronny | |
| 2013 | Adoration | Tom | |
| 2014 | Mall | Mal | |
| 2014 | The Drop | Fitz | |
| 2015 | The Stanford Prison Experiment | Matthew Townshend | |
| 2015 | About Scout | Sam Prescott | |
| 2016 | I.T. | Ed Porter | |
| 2018 | Black '47 | Martin Feeney | |
| 2020 | The Dry | Jamie Sullivan | |
| 2021 | Creation Stories | Troy | |
| 2021 | Zátopek | Ron Clarke | |
| 2023 | The Royal Hotel | Teeth | |
| 2024 | The Seven Sorrows of Mary | Gabriel | |
| 2025 | Hangashore | Jack | |
| 2025 | The Running Man | Donahue | |
| 2026 | How to Make a Killing | Lyle | |

=== Television ===
| Year | Title | Role | Notes | Ref. |
|---|---|---|---|---|
| 2014 | New Girl | Buster | 2 episodes | |
| 2014 | Transparent | Patrick | 1 episode | |
| 2018 | Requiem | Nick Dean | Miniseries, 6 episodes | |
| 2021 | The Pursuit of Love | Christian Talbot | Miniseries, 3 episodes | |
| 2022 | Peaky Blinders | Jack Nelson ("Uncle Jack") | 4 episodes | |
| 2024 | Masters of the Air | Major Bill Veal | Miniseries, 4 episodes | |

=== Music videos ===
| Year | Artist | Title | Role | Ref. |
|---|---|---|---|---|
| 2023 | Sophie Lowe | From the Inside | Male Lead | |
