= Onata Aprile =

American actress (born 2005)

- Born: April 24, 2005 (age 20); Mohnton, Pennsylvania, U.S.
- Occupation: Actress
- Years active: 2010–present

Onata Aprile is an American actress, best known for playing the title role in the 2012 film What Maisie Knew, and a supporting role in the 2015 film About Scout.

== Early life and education ==
Aprile was born on April 24, 2005, in Mohnton, Pennsylvania, and at the age of two she moved to New York City.

== Career ==
Aprile started her career in 2010 by appearing in the TV series Law & Order: Special Victims Unit, and then starred in the films like Yellow and The History of Future Folk. In 2012, she played the titular role in the drama film What Maisie Knew, along with Julianne Moore and Alexander Skarsgård. Her performance was praised by critics.

== Personal life ==
Aprile's father David Statler has a Dragonfly Studio and Gallery in West Reading, Pennsylvania, while she lives in New York with her mother, artist and actress Valentine Aprile. Her paternal grandmother is Japanese.

== Filmography ==
=== Film ===
Year	Title	Role	Notes
2011	Choose	Hayley	Short film
2011	Twist		Short film
2012	The History of Future Folk	Wren	
2012	What Maisie Knew	Maisie	
2012	Yellow	Linda	
2013	Big Girl	Hannah	Short film
2014	Almost Family	Lauren	
2015	About Scout	Tallulah 'Lulu' Havers	
2020	The Last Thing He Wanted	Cat McMahon	

=== Television ===
Year	Title	Role	Notes
2010	Law & Order: Special Victims Unit	Lizzie Holbart	1 episode
2014	Boardwalk Empire	Susan Thompson	2 episodes
2014	Chicago P.D.	Amy	1 episode
2017	Madam Secretary	Julie Harberts	1 episode
2018	Instinct	Madison	1 episode
2018	Manifest	Hallie Pyler	1 episode
2022	New Amsterdam	Bizzie	1 episode
