= Mat Vairo =

American actor, singer, and songwriter

Mat Vairo is an American actor, singer, and songwriter. Vairo began his career in 2012 on the stage portraying Melchior Gabor in the musical Spring Awakening. He has since gone on to star in multiple television series and films. He is now recurring on The Bold Type as Scott Coleman.

== Career ==
Vairo made his television series regular debut as Connor Bennett on the NBC series Revolution in 2014. He was a series regular on the A&E television series The Returned in 2015, in the role of Simon Moran. His additional television credits include CSI: Crime Scene Investigation, Switched at Birth and Jane the Virgin. In 2018, Vairo appeared as Stirling Adams in the episode "AKA I Want Your Cray Cray" of Jessica Jones. He appeared most recently in The Bold Type.

Vairo's theater credits include Spring Awakening and Disney’s Aladdin! A Musical Spectacular.
