= The Returned (American TV series) =

2015 American horror drama television series

- Genre: Supernatural drama
- Based on: The Returned
- Developed by: Carlton Cuse
- Starring: Kevin Alejandro; Agnes Bruckner; India Ennenga; Sandrine Holt; Sophie Lowe; Mark Pellegrino; Jeremy Sisto; Mat Vairo; Mary Elizabeth Winstead; Tandi Wright
- Composers: Zoë Keating; Jeff Russo
- Country of origin: United States
- Original language: English
- No. of seasons: 1
- No. of episodes: 10

Production
- Executive producers: Carlton Cuse; Raelle Tucker
- Production location: Squamish, British Columbia
- Running time: 43-46 minutes
- Production companies: A+E Studios; FremantleMedia North America; Carlton Cuse Productions; Angry Annie Productions

Original release
- Network: A&E
- Release: March 9 – May 11, 2015

The Returned is an American supernatural drama television series developed by Carlton Cuse as an adaptation of the 2012 French series Les Revenants, which was broadcast internationally as The Returned. The American adapted series follows residents in a small town whose lives are disrupted when people who have been dead for many years begin reappearing. Cuse wrote the pilot episode and executive produced the series alongside Raelle Tucker. The series premiered on March 9, 2015 and was cancelled by A&E after one season, on June 15, 2015.

== Cast ==
=== Main ===
- Kevin Alejandro as Sheriff Tommy Solano
- Agnes Bruckner as Deputy Nikki Banks
- India Ennenga as Camille Winship
- Sandrine Holt as Dr. Julie Han
- Sophie Lowe as Lena Winship
- Mark Pellegrino as Jack Winship
- Jeremy Sisto as Peter Lattimore
- Mat Vairo as Simon Moran
- Mary Elizabeth Winstead as Rowan Blackshaw
- Tandi Wright as Claire Winship

=== Recurring ===
- Aaron Douglas as Tony Darrow
- Terry Chen as Deputy Mark Bao
- Dylan Kingwell as Victor
- Dakota Guppy as Chloe Blackshaw
- Keenan Tracey as Ben Lowry
- Carl Lumbly as Pastor Leon Wright
- Leah Gibson as Lucy McCabe
- Chelah Horsdal as Kris
- Michelle Forbes as Helen Goddard
- Rhys Ward as Adam Darrow
- Alexander Calvert as Hunter
- Giacomo Baessato as Deputy Shane Slater
- Renn Hawkey as Paul Koretsky
- Roger Cross as Matt
- Hannah Levien as Marie

== Episodes ==
No.	Title	Directed by	Teleplay by	Original release date	U.S. viewers (millions)
1	"Camille"	Keith Gordon	Carlton Cuse	March 9, 2015	1.54
The Winship family is shocked when their daughter Camille, killed in a bus accident four years earlier, returns home unharmed, believing it is the same day as the accident. Simon attempts to find his fiancée, Rowan, unaware that he's been dead six years and she is now engaged to another man. Helen Goddard goes to her husband's apartment, 30 years after her death; her husband initially calls local doctor Julie Han but decides, instead, to jump off a local dam. Julie brings home a small boy who refuses to speak, and, improvising, she names him "Victor" when her nosy neighbor questions her. Lucy, a local waitress, is seemingly fatally stabbed while out walking, after arguing with and being sexually assaulted by Jack Winship. In a flashback to the day of the crash, Lena feigns illness to avoid the bus trip, in order to stay home and secretly meet with her boyfriend, and Camille becomes distressed when she "senses" her twin's first sexual encounter. As Camille tries to get the bus to stop, the distracted driver notices Victor standing in the road and swerves, causing the bus to plummet over the cliff edge.
2	"Simon"	Vincenzo Natali	Raelle Tucker	March 16, 2015	1.08
Camille's family, including her twin sister Lena, attempts to deal with her reintegration into their lives. Rowan, who has begun arrangements to marry Tommy, makes peace with what she believes are visions of Simon, who has finally located her. The police realize Lucy's stabbing matches the modus operandi of a serial killer from seven years ago who was believed dead; bar owner Tony is considered a suspect, and he takes note of the stabbing patterns in the victims' photos. Julie becomes affected by Victor's presence and breaks down in her bathroom, revealing healed wounds resembling those of the murder victims in the police photos.
3	"Julie"	Charles Martin	Raelle Tucker	March 23, 2015	1.05
Her parents discuss moving elsewhere, and in public, Camille pretends to be Lena's cousin, "Alice", in order to be accepted. Meanwhile, Lena develops a wound on her back. Simon gets released to Peter, who explains to him that Simon died and has returned like some others. Simon plans to say goodbye to Rowan, until she shows him Chloe, their child conceived shortly before his death. Lena informs Rowan that Simon had been looking for her, confirming he is alive. Tony goes to his family's cabin and is shocked to find his brother Adam, thought to have been dead for several years. Deputy Nikki Banks visits Julie to tell her of Lucy's murder, which resembles the attack on Julie seven years ago, when she and Nikki were in a relationship. Julie is threatened by her neighbor, Annie, who believes Julie has illegally adopted Victor; when Julie leaves to get food, Victor knocks on Annie's door.
4	"Victor"	Charles Martin	Regina Corrado	March 30, 2015	1.12
Following Annie's death, Nikki forces Julie to release Victor into Peter's care at the shelter, where Victor soon realizes that Peter is one of the two men who burgled his house and shot him, 29 years ago. Tommy uses his home surveillance equipment and sees Rowan and Simon having sex. Rowan introduces Simon to Chloe, who thinks he is an "angel". Rowan makes a painful decision about Tommy. Helen meets with a minister to discuss being returned; she then goes to the shelter. Lena is rushed to hospital for the wound on her back, which has become life-threatening. She later recalls visiting the morgue to view Camille's body, which bore the same wound that killed her in the bus crash.
5	"Tony and Adam"	Jennifer Getzinger	Graham Roland	April 6, 2015	1.05
Seven years ago, Tony sets out to look for his brother Adam. Tony finds his brother after Adam's attacked Julie and is now feeding on her unconscious body. Tony knocks him out, carries him off, and leaves Julie to be found by others who are coming his way. Tony then begins to bury him in the woods. Adam wakes up and starts screaming for their mother, and Tony kills him with the shovel. In the present, Adam realizes that Tony had killed him and then attacks Tony. Tony suggests Adam's "sickness" was caused by their mother. Simon wishes to leave town with Rowan and Chloe, but Rowan throws out his things and, for now, chooses Tommy. Victor disappears from the shelter after telling Peter that he knows his secret: Peter was involved in the killings of Victor and his mother. After seeing a herd of dead deer floating down the river, Helen finds Victor in town and calls him by his real name, Henry. She takes him to dinner and tells him the town is cursed, comparing it to the world at the time of the Biblical flood. She talks of the local dam's breaking 29 years ago, when she died. Victor escapes Helen, only to be found by Peter. A medical examiner suggests all the deer committed suicide. Lena leaves the hospital after sensing Camille drunkenly kissing a guy. Lena tells everyone at the bar that "Alice" is her dead sister, who is now trying to kill her. Camille claims that Lena is heavily medicated. Lena runs off into the woods and stumbles into Adam.
6	"Lucy"	Jennifer Getzinger	Bronwyn Garrity	April 13, 2015	1.05
Lena wakes in Adam's cabin, where he tends to the wound on her back. After seeing him talk to Tony, who previously told her that Adam was dead, she accepts that Adam is "like the others" (returned). Back home, her family worries about her having gone missing, which leads Jack and Claire to fight over Jack's not intervening in Lena's partying at the bar and Claire's constant state of mourning Camille. Peter takes Victor to the grave of his partner who shot Victor and his mother. He begs Victor's forgiveness and offers his gun for revenge. Victor causes Peter to envision his partner pulling the trigger, but the gun misfires, and Peter envisions holding the gun to his own head. Julie talks to Helen about her death in the town flood, only to learn Victor also died and returned. Julie then questions her own existence. Camille tries to seduce Ben, who is repulsed when she admits to not being "Alice". Lucy is declared dead but revives minutes later. She begins to hear voices and later tells Jack about his father's death in a drunken car accident.
7	"Rowan"	Stephen Williams	Gianna Sobol	April 20, 2015	0.87
Lena finds Lucy's necklace in Adam's shed and realizes who he is. She attempts to escape, but is caught and bound by Tony. Adam arrives to release her, saying he has been "healed" since returning. Ben exhumes Camille's grave and finds that her coffin is filled with water but otherwise empty. Tommy interrogates Ben at the station and learns about Camille's return. Before Tommy can reveal the news to the public, Camille, Claire, Peter, and Jack inform the bus victims' parents about the returned. It is revealed that Rowan attempted to kill herself a year ago. She realizes she wasted time mourning Simon, who still tries to get back together with her. She tells him about his suicide, which he wasn't aware of. He tries to take her away, and Tommy shoots him dead, seeing him as a threat.
8	"Claire"	Stephen Williams	Raelle Tucker	April 27, 2015	0.82
It is revealed that Claire and Peter's affair started before the bus crash. Nikki reads a file from 1986 about Henry's (Victor's) death and his reappearing during the year leading up to the bus crash, only to be abandoned, just days before it, near the spot where the driver swerves off the road. Nikki tells Julie, who still keeps Victor around. Lena returns home and relates her captivity to Camille, her parents and Peter. Jack confronts Tony, thinking he is the killer, but Peter stops Jack from killing him. With Tony in custody, Julie goes to identify found evidence. Victor, accompanying her, causes Tony to imagine his mother shaming him, and Tony kills himself, as Adam arrives in an attempt to confess. Meanwhile, Rowan and Tommy resume their wedding plans, but Chloe wants her angel back. Simon returns again in the morgue.
9	"Helen"	Deran Sarafian	Graham Roland	May 4, 2015	0.93
In a flashback to 29 years ago, Helen is shown in a mental institution, where she predicts the demise of the town. Subsequently, the dam collapse engulfs the town in a torrential flood, killing many of the town's residents, including Helen. In present day, Helen engages intimately with and kills a dam worker in order to procure information for her plan to blow up the dam. Simon kidnaps Chloe. He decides to return his daughter to Rowan's custody at the place he left Rowan when he committed suicide years ago. Camille struggles with the town's perception of her return. Nikki deepens her investigation into Victor's past. Peter reveals his true identity at the unveiling of the memorial for the children lost in the bus crash.
10	"Peter"	Deran Sarafian	Raelle Tucker	May 11, 2015	0.94
Peter recalls in a flashback, to 29 years ago, that he was killed by gunshot in an accident. Back in the present, Peter intends to leave town after revealing that he, like Camille, had died and come back to life. He is later arrested by Tommy for fraud, identity theft, and accessory to kidnapping. Meanwhile, Lucy claims she's hearing warnings that "Something bad is going to happen" from the people who died 29 years ago. A journalist, Kara (Joanne Kelly), comes looking to speak to Camille but speaks to Peter instead. Kara claims Caldwell is not the only town to have people coming back from the dead, and all the other towns that did ceased to exist. Camille and Lena go swimming in the river as Hunter and Ben apologize for their actions. After getting high on mushrooms, Hunter cuts Camille to prove she's not real. Camille runs off in distress and is found by Ben. They have sex in the woods, which ends up with Ben dead. In the dark, Lena sees Adam lurking behind a tree. Nikki recovers in the hospital as Julie confronts Henry and brings him to his old house, now abandoned. As Tommy and Rowan's wedding proceeds, Simon hitchhikes with Helen, and she tells him to get out of town. They blow a tire, and while grabbing the spare, Simon sees the dynamite Helen carries in the trunk. She knocks him out and goes to Rawlins Lake Dam to plant the dynamite, intending to destroy the town to end the "curse". At the wedding dinner, Lucy gives Rowan a message, "He'll be here soon. When he's here, you need to listen." Lucy implies to Rowan that she is pregnant with Simon's baby. Simon runs back into town but sees a vision of the dam breaking and the water destroying the town. He continues running as the scene fades to black.

== Development ==
In May 2013, it was revealed that an English-language adaptation of the 2012 series was being developed by Paul Abbott and FremantleMedia, with the working title They Came Back. In September 2013, it was revealed that Abbott was no longer involved with the project, which A&E would develop. In April 2014, A&E ordered 10 episodes for the first season. On March 5, 2015, it was announced Netflix had acquired global rights to the show and would air it internationally each week, via its streaming service, following A&E's airing.

== Production ==
The show, set in the fictional Cascades Mountains town of Caldwell, in Caldwell County, Washington, is actually filmed in and around Squamish, British Columbia.

== Critical reception ==
The Returned has received mostly positive responses from critics. Rotten Tomatoes gives it a 67% approval rating, with a rating average of 7.4/10, based on reviews from 33 critics. The site's consensus states: "Though overshadowed by its superior source material, the US version of The Returned retains enough of the creep factor and character drama to appease fans of the genre." Metacritic scored it 67 out of 100, based on 24 "generally favorable" reviews.

== See also ==
- Resurrection, a 2014–15 American series with a similar premise.
- Glitch, an Australian TV series with a similar premise.
- Revival, a 2025 American TV series with a similar premise
