= Lucy Gordon (actress) =

British actress and model (1980–2009)

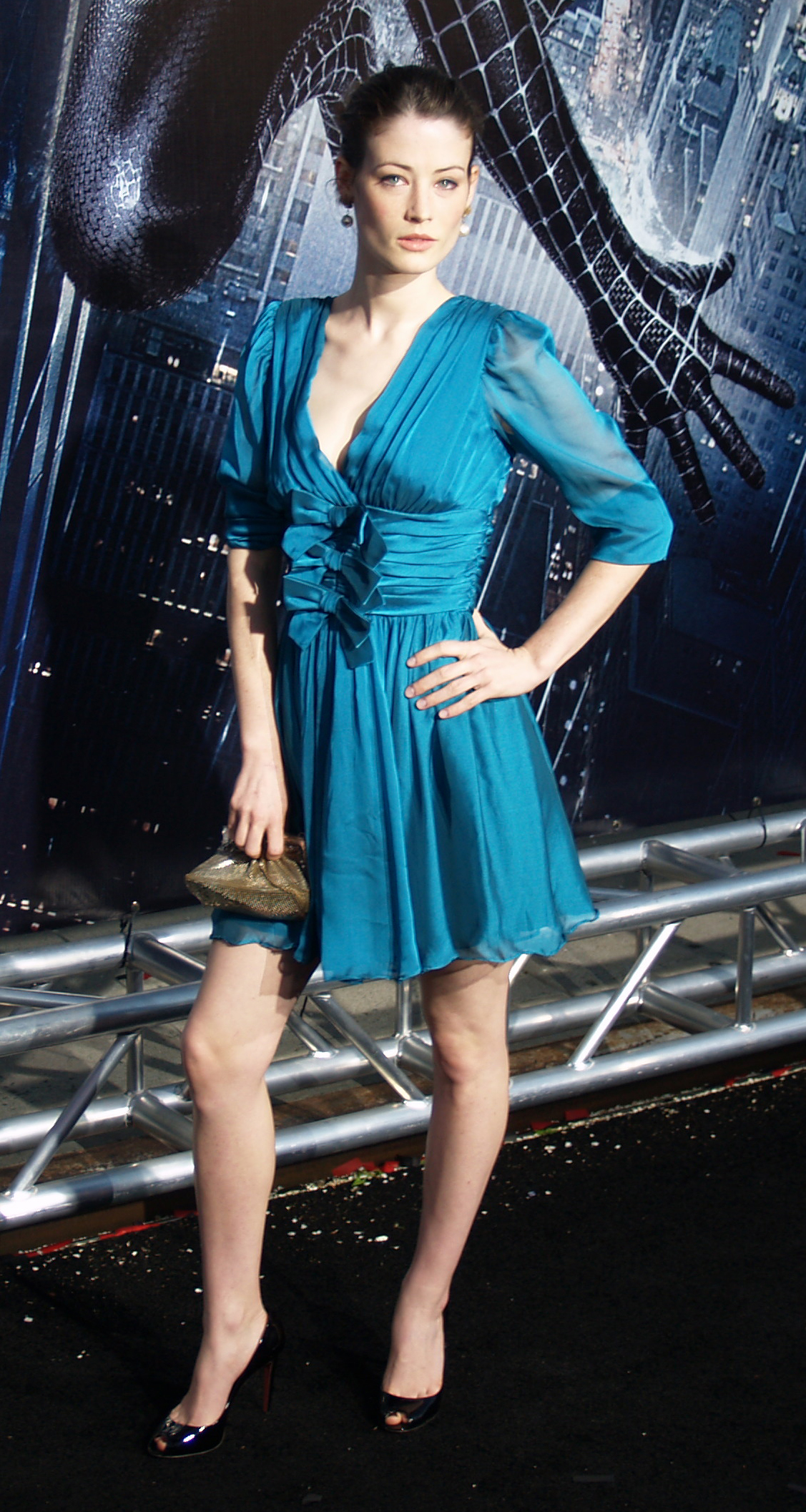
- Gordon at the premiere of Spider-Man 3, April 2007
- Born: Lucy Imogen Gordon; 22 May 1980; Oxford, England
- Died: 20 May 2009 (aged 28); Paris, France
- Occupations: Actress; model
- Years active: 1995–2009

Lucy Imogen Gordon (22 May 1980 – 20 May 2009) was an English actress and model. She became a face of CoverGirl in 1997 before starting an acting career.

She broke through in Cédric Klapisch's Russian Dolls in 2005.

Her first film was Perfume in 2001 before going on to have small roles in Spider-Man 3, Serendipity, and The Four Feathers. Gordon had played the actress and singer Jane Birkin in the film Gainsbourg, a biopic of singer-songwriter Serge Gainsbourg. Before the film was released, she hanged herself in her flat in Paris on 20 May 2009.

== Early life ==
Lucy Imogen Gordon was born on 22 May 1980, in Oxford, England. She went to Oxford High School. She moved to Paris after living in New York City for several years.

== Career ==
While in the fourth form of Oxford High School she was noticed by a talent-spotter from a modelling agency as she and her mother visited a Clothes Show Live exhibition. She went on to appear as one of the faces of CoverGirl and soon after she moved into acting. She was signed to Select modelling agency in London and had appeared in the covers of Italian Glamour and Elle.

Gordon made her film debut in the 2001 as the character Sarah in Perfume. She appeared alongside Heath Ledger in the 2002 film The Four Feathers. She appeared as the reporter Jennifer Dugan in the 2007 film Spider-Man 3.

Gordon played the actress and singer Jane Birkin in a film biopic of singer-songwriter Serge Gainsbourg. The film, entitled Serge Gainsbourg, vie héroïque was presented at the 2009 Cannes Film Festival and was released in early 2010. Gordon's father, Richard Gordon said that she had loved playing her latest role in this film about Gainsbourg. The director Joann Sfar and the producers of the film Marc du Pontavice and Didier Lupfer released a statement that the film "owes a lot to the generosity, gentleness and immense talent of Lucy Gordon."

== Death ==
On 20 May 2009, Gordon was found hanging by an electrical wire in the Paris flat she shared with her French boyfriend, Jérôme Alméras, just 2 days shy of her 29th birthday. A French police official said she appeared to have committed suicide by hanging.

== Filmography ==
=== Film ===
Year	Title	Role	Notes
2001	Perfume	Sarah	
2001	Serendipity	Caroline Mitchell	
2002	The Four Feathers	Isabelle	
2005	Russian Dolls	Celia Shelburn	
2007	Spider-Man 3	Jennifer Dugan	
2007	Serial	Sadie Grady	
2009	The Last International Playboy	Kate Hardwick	
2009	Brief Interviews with Hideous Men	Hitchhiker	
2009	Cinéman	Viviane Cook	Posthumous release
2010	Gainsbourg: A Heroic Life	Jane Birkin	Posthumous release; final role

=== Television ===
Year	Title	Role	Notes
2005	Stella	China	Episode: "Office Party"
