= Above Suspicion (2019 film) =

Crime film by Phillip Noyce

- Theatrical release poster
- Directed by: Phillip Noyce
- Screenplay by: Chris Gerolmo
- Based on: Above Suspicion; 1993 novel by Joe Sharkey
- Produced by: Amy Adelson; Mohamed AlRafi; Angela Amato Velez; Colleen Camp; Tim Degraye
- Starring: Jack Huston; Emilia Clarke; Sophie Lowe; Austin Hebert; Karl Glusman; Chris Mulkey; Omar Benson Miller; Kevin Dunn; Thora Birch; Johnny Knoxville
- Cinematography: Elliot Davis
- Edited by: Martin Nicholson
- Music by: Dickon Hinchliffe
- Production companies: 50 Degrees Entertainment; White Knight Pictures; Colleen Camp Productions; Bold Films
- Distributed by: Lionsgate
- Release dates: March 27, 2019 (Egypt); May 7, 2021 (United States)
- Running time: 104 minutes
- Country: United States
- Language: English
- Box office: $25,396

Above Suspicion is a 2019 American crime thriller film directed by Phillip Noyce, from a screenplay by Chris Gerolmo, based upon Joe Sharkey's non-fiction book of the same name revolving around the murder of Susan Smith. It stars Emilia Clarke, Jack Huston, Sophie Lowe, Austin Hébert, Karl Glusman, Chris Mulkey, Omar Miller, Kevin Dunn, Thora Birch and Johnny Knoxville.

It was released in the United States on May 7, 2021, by Lionsgate.

== Plot ==
Susan Smith is a drug addict who lives with her abusive boyfriend Cash and two young children in a run-down trailer in Pikeville, Kentucky. She meets an ambitious rookie agent assigned to an FBI field office who recruits Susan as his informant for a high-profile case. Susan believes her bad luck may finally be changing, but as their relationship deepens, so does the danger, setting in motion a downward spiral of jealousy, betrayal and violence resulting in one of the most notorious crimes in FBI history.

== Cast ==
- Emilia Clarke as Susan Smith
- Jack Huston as Mark Putnam
- Sophie Lowe as Kathy Putnam
- Karl Glusman as Joe-Bea
- Austin Hébert as Randy McCoy
- Thora Birch as Jolene
- Johnny Knoxville as Cash
- Brian Lee Franklin as Rufus
- Luke Spencer Roberts as Bones
- Kevin Dunn as Bob Singer
- Chris Mulkey as Todd Eason
- Omar Benson Miller as Denver Rhodes
- Matt Combs as Lead KSP Trooper
- Brittany O'Grady as Georgia Beale

== Production ==
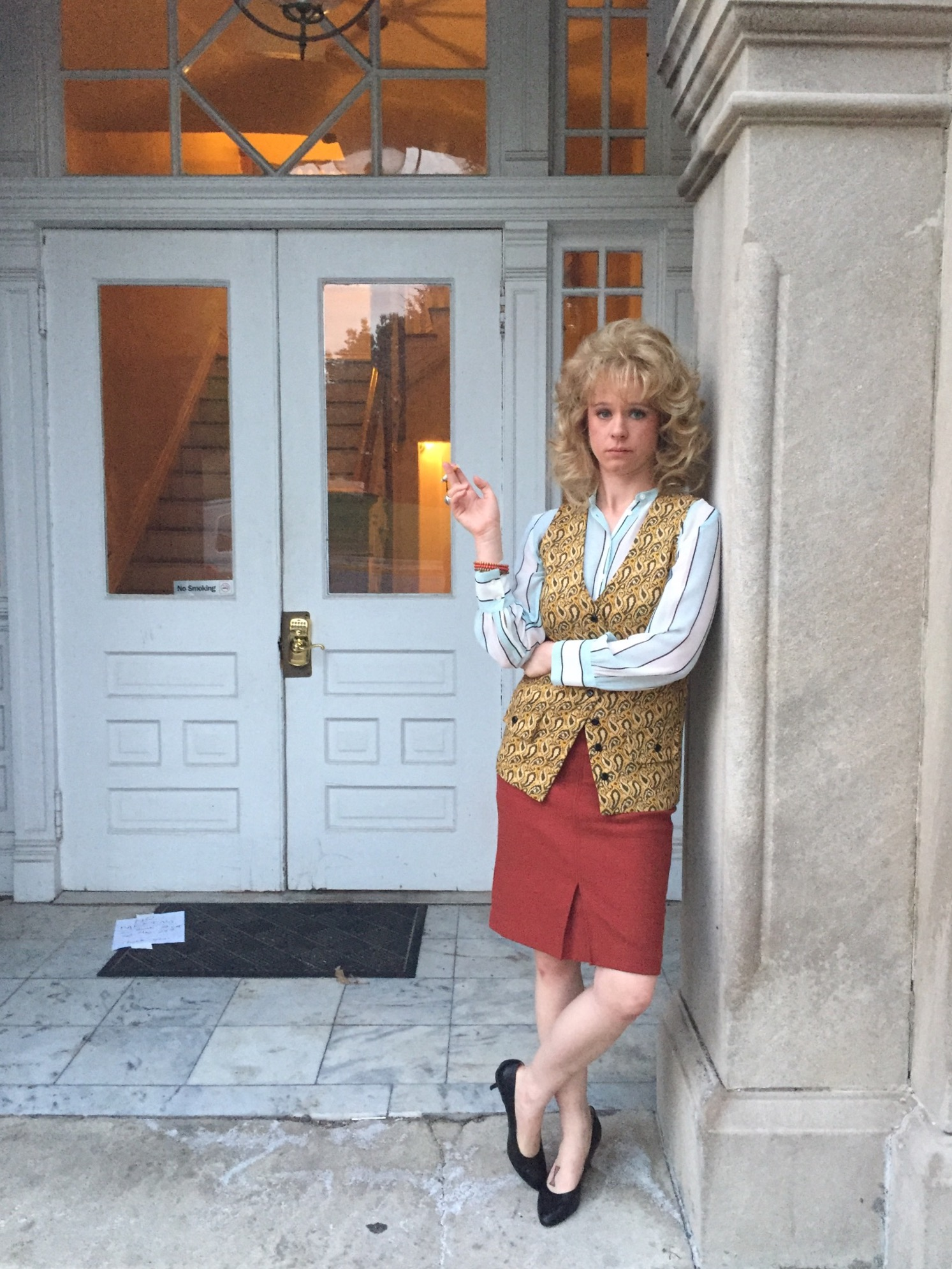
Thora Birch as Jolene on set

The film was announced during the 2016 Cannes Film Festival. Philip Noyce was set as director, with Emilia Clarke and Jack Huston cast as the film's two main leads. The production began filming in Lexington, Kentucky on May 24, 2016. Omar Benson Miller was cast on May 25, 2016, with May 27 seeing the additions of Thora Birch and Johnny Knoxville to the cast, alongside numerous other supporting actors. Filming took place in central and eastern Kentucky – in Lexington in Fayette County, and in Bourbon and Harlan counties – in 2016.

== Release ==
The film was released in Egypt on March 27, 2019. Its theatrical release in the United States and on VOD was on May 7, 2021 by Lionsgate.

== Reception ==
On review aggregator Rotten Tomatoes, the film holds an approval rating of 25% based on 40 reviews, with an average rating of 4.5/10. On Metacritic, the film holds a rating of 46 out of 100, based on nine critics, indicating "mixed or average" reviews.
