= What Maisie Knew (film) =

2012 American drama film by David Siegel and Scott McGehee

- Theatrical release poster
- Directed by: Scott McGehee; David Siegel
- Screenplay by: Carroll Cartwright; Nancy Doyne
- Based on: What Maisie Knew by Henry James
- Produced by: Daniel Crown; Daniela Taplin Lundberg; William Teitler; Charles Weinstock
- Starring: Julianne Moore; Alexander Skarsgård; Onata Aprile; Joanna Vanderham; Steve Coogan
- Cinematography: Giles Nuttgens
- Edited by: Madeleine Gavin
- Music by: Nick Urata
- Production companies: Red Crown Productions; Dreambridge Films; Fortissimo Films; Prospero Pictures
- Distributed by: Millennium Entertainment
- Release dates: September 7, 2012 (TIFF); May 3, 2013
- Running time: 99 minutes
- Countries: United States; Canada; Netherlands
- Language: English
- Budget: $5 million
- Box office: $2.7 million

What Maisie Knew is a 2012 drama film directed by Scott McGehee and David Siegel and written by Carroll Cartwright and Nancy Doyne. Starring Julianne Moore, Alexander Skarsgård, Onata Aprile, Joanna Vanderham and Steve Coogan, it is a modern adaptation of Henry James' 1897 novel What Maisie Knew. The film finds six-year-old Maisie in the middle of a custody battle between her neglectful parents and their new partners.

Cartwright and Doyne wrote the film's script in 1995 but the project languished in development hell until McGehee and Siegel were hired as directors. It was filmed in New York over seven weeks in 2011 with music scored by DeVotchKa's Nick Urata. The film premiered at the 2012 Toronto International Film Festival, and was theatrically released on May 3, 2013, by Millennium Entertainment. It earned $2.7 million at the global box office and received positive reviews from critics.

== Plot ==
Six-year-old Maisie lives in a New York apartment with her parents, Susanna, a singer in a rock band, and Beale, an international art dealer. Susanna and Beale argue with each other viciously and constantly, often ignoring Maisie and leaving her in the care of their nanny, Margo. Maisie does not always understand her parents' actions, such as when Susanna hires a locksmith to change the lock on the apartment's front door to keep Beale out. When they decide to separate, her parents are granted joint custody of Maisie.

After the separation, Margo moves into Beale's apartment and they get married soon afterwards. In response to the marriage, Susanna impulsively marries Lincoln, a bartender whom she barely knows. Maisie bonds with Lincoln, but Susanna quickly grows resentful of how much Maisie warms to him.

Although both Susanna and Beale think they deserve full custody, their desire to keep Maisie is primarily to spite each other, and they are quick to pass her off to the other parent when looking after her becomes inconvenient. Maisie's time is split between staying with each of her parents, though her primary caregivers become Lincoln and Margo as Susanna leaves on a tour and Beale disappears on business trips. With his relationship with Margo disintegrating, Beale decides to move to the United Kingdom.

With Beale and Susanna gone, Margo, Lincoln, and Maisie begin to spend time together. While Susanna is supposedly on tour, the three run into her in New York. After an angry confrontation in which Susanna accuses Lincoln and Margo of stealing Maisie from her, Lincoln declares that their relationship is over, telling Susanna that she does not deserve Maisie.

When Susanna leaves the city, Maisie once again ends up in Margo's care. Margo takes Maisie to stay in her cousin's beach house and invites Lincoln to visit, much to Maisie's delight, and Lincoln and Margo kiss. One night, Susanna stops by the beach house unannounced in her tour bus to pick Maisie up, but Maisie chooses to stay with Margo and Lincoln instead. After shouting at her, Susanna realizes that Maisie is scared of her and that it is in Maisie's best interests to stay behind.

== Cast ==
- Julianne Moore as Susanna, Maisie's mother and a rock singer
- Alexander Skarsgård as Lincoln, Susanna's second husband and Maisie's stepfather
- Onata Aprile as Maisie, Susanna and Beale's daughter
- Steve Coogan as Beale, art dealer and Maisie's father
- Joanna Vanderham as Margo, Beale's wife and Maisie's nanny

== Production ==
=== Development ===
What Maisie Knew was written by Carroll Cartwright and Nancy Doyne in 1995, based on the 1897 novel What Maisie Knew by Henry James. At the time, Cartwright was involved in a legal dispute over the custody of his daughter. Director Scott McGehee later said that Cartwright had used James' novel "as a lens" through which to write about his own divorce and raising his daughter. According to Cartwright, he and Doyne struggled to find producers, financiers and directors interested in making the film because of the challenges of working with a young child at its center. Producer Charles Weinstock was involved in the project for a number of years and was eventually responsible for obtaining financing from Red Crown Productions and hiring McGehee and David Siegel as directors. McGehee and Siegel were initially apprehensive about the script but decided to read it after hearing from their agent that actress Julianne Moore was interested in playing one of the roles; they accepted the directing job after talking to Moore about the story. Although McGehee and Siegel were reluctant to make a film about divorce, they liked that the script focused on Maisie's perspective, noting that it was unusual for a film aimed at adults to have a story told from the perspective of a child.

=== Casting ===
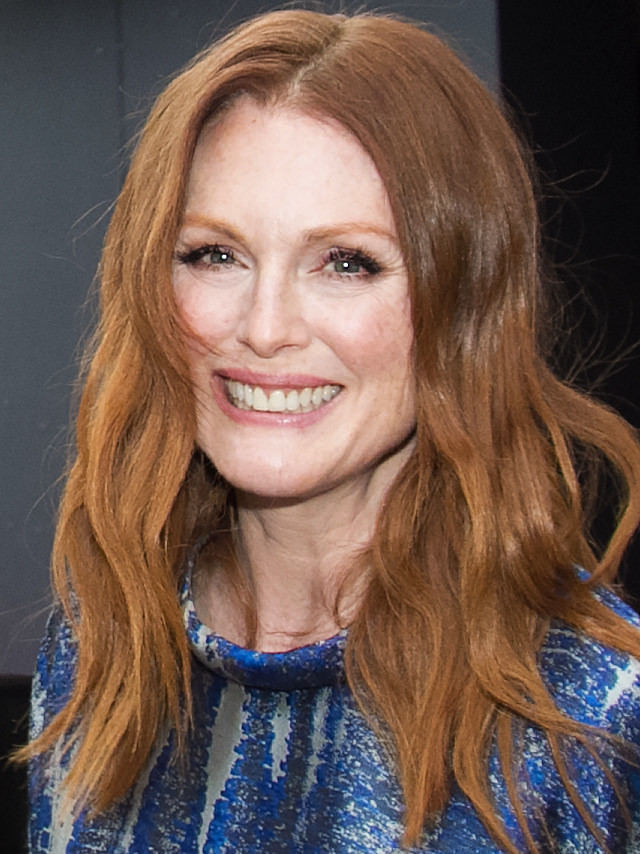
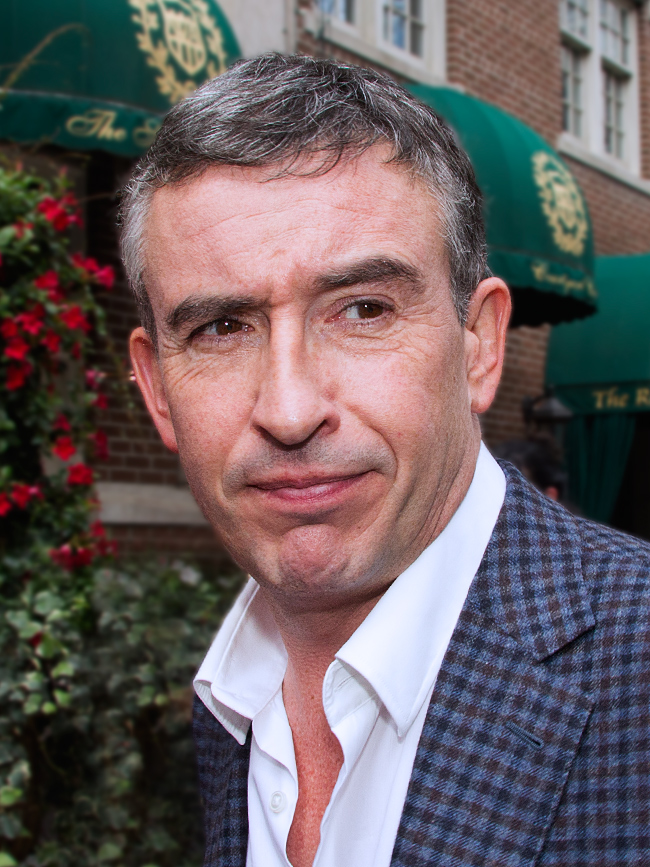
Julianne Moore and Steve Coogan play Maisie's parents.

Casting for the role of Maisie took eight weeks. Casting director Avy Kaufman suggested about 100 young girls to McGehee and Siegel while the directors independently visited New York elementary schools to hold auditions. Six-year-old Onata Aprile auditioned relatively late, and was cast three weeks before production started. She met with two of her adult co-stars, Julianne Moore and Alexander Skarsgård, for a brief rehearsal period before filming began. Moore, who had read the film's script before directors McGehee and Siegel, was anxious about having to sing as part of her role. She prepared by meeting with music producer Peter Nashel, singer Elaine Caswell, and Alison Mosshart, the lead singer of The Kills, whose songs Moore performed in the film.

Steve Coogan was the directors' first choice to play Beale, although the film's producers wanted to cast another English actor. McGehee and Siegel felt Coogan was suited to the role because "no matter what awful things he does and says, somehow there's something sympathetic about him". Joanna Vanderham, the last actor to be cast in the film, secured her role two weeks before production started after talking with McGehee, Siegel and Kaufman on Skype from Glasgow.

=== Filming ===
What Maisie Knew was filmed in New York for 35 days over seven weeks in the summer of 2011. It was shot on 35mm film using an Arri camera. Filming took place in mainly Lower Manhattan, and scenes at the beach house were shot on Long Island. One scene featuring Maisie and Lincoln taking a day trip together was shot on the High Line. A scene in which Susanna performs at a concert was filmed at Webster Hall using a pre-recorded vocal track, a backing band and a small audience. According to McGehee and Siegel, a significant challenge during filming was the limited time with which they were able to work with Aprile each day due to her early bedtime. While shooting one of the film's final scenes wherein Susanna arrives at the beach house at night to pick up Maisie, Aprile fell asleep and could not be woken up; the shoot had to be postponed until two weeks later.

=== Music ===
The film's score was composed by Nick Urata of the musical group DeVotchKa. It was inspired by rock music, to which McGehee and Siegel thought Maisie would have been exposed with a musician mother. McGehee described Urata's score as "us[ing] rock language but in a more childlike way". Julianne Moore's character sings two songs in the film, "Night Train" and "Hook and Line", both written and originally recorded by The Kills.

== Release ==
=== Box office ===
What Maisie Knew premiered at the 2012 Toronto Film Festival on September 7, 2012. Millennium Films purchased the film's U.S. distribution rights soon after its premiere. The film was released in the United States on May 3, 2013. Opening in a single theater in New York, it earned $21,480 on its opening weekend and $31,152 by the end of its first week. It expanded to three theaters in its second week of release, was playing in 27 theaters by its fourth week, and reached its widest release of 122 theaters in its sixth week. It was in release for a total of thirteen weeks and grossed $1,066,471 in that time. In the United Kingdom, the film was released by Curzon Film World in cinemas and through video on demand (VOD) services on August 23, 2013, with £150,000 pledged by the British Film Institute towards the film's £244,000 marketing budget. It earned £330,186 in box office revenue from four weeks of release and £65,832 from VOD rentals in the first six weeks it was available. In other territories, the film performed best in Australia (grossing US$334,651), Spain ($196,668), New Zealand ($140,696) and Brazil ($100,453). It earned a total of $1,644,908 outside of the U.S. for a total worldwide gross of $2,711,379.

=== Critical response ===
What Maisie Knew received generally positive reviews from critics. On Rotten Tomatoes, the film holds a rating of 86%, based on 111 reviews, with an average rating of 7.6/10. The site's consensus states: "It's undeniably difficult to watch at times, but What Maisie Knew ultimately rises on the strength of its solidly sourced script, powerful performances, and empathetic direction." On Metacritic, the film has a score of 74 out of 100, based on reviews from 32 critics, indicating "generally favorable reviews".

In a review for Variety, Justin Chang summarized What Maisie Knew as a "beautifully observed drama" and wrote that, although the plot was consistently dark, it contained "enough sensitivity and emotional variation to make the experience cumulatively heartrending". New York magazine's David Edelstein praised the subtleties in the writing and performances of the adult characters and opined that the cinematography was "as open and graceful as any [he had] seen all year". A. O. Scott of The New York Times described the film as a "brilliant, haunting adaptation" of Henry James' novel, praising Aprile's performance as Maisie in particular. The Los Angeles Times critic Betsy Sharkey also commended Aprile, Moore and Coogan's acting and felt that the "beautifully rendered film" was able to achieve emotional resonance without becoming melodramatic. The Boston Globe's Ty Burr, who awarded the film 3.5 out of 4 stars, opined that its success was largely attributable to Aprile's performance. John DeFore of The Hollywood Reporter noted the film's "uniformly strong performances" and praised McGehee and Siegel for maintaining a sense of plausibility in spite of the melodramatic plot. For the New York Observer, Rex Reed wrote of the film's "warmth, intelligence and grace" and concluded his review: "poignant and exemplary, this is one of the best films of 2013".

Chris Nashawaty of Entertainment Weekly found the film unoriginal, "pointless and inert" and awarded it a C grade. Slant Magazine's Chris Cabin felt that the characters were one-dimensional and stereotypical, and described the film as "an abhorrent slice of tasteless familial drama".

=== Accolades ===
List of accolades received by What Maisie Knew
Award	Category	Recipients	Result	Ref
Dublin Film Critics' Circle Awards	Best Film		Nominated	
Dublin Film Critics' Circle Awards	Best Actress	Julianne Moore	Nominated	
Dublin Film Critics' Circle Awards	Best Actress	Onata Aprile	Nominated	
London Film Critics Circle Awards	British Actor of the Year	Steve Coogan (also for Alan Partridge: Alpha Papa, The Look of Love and Philomena)	Nominated	
Newport Beach Film Festival	Outstanding Achievement (Acting)	Onata Aprile	Won	
Seattle International Film Festival	Best Actress	Onata Aprile	2nd place	
USC Scripter Award		Carroll Cartwright (screenwriter), Nancy Doyne (screenwriter), Henry James (author)	Nominated	
Women Film Critics Circle Awards	Best Young Actress	Onata Aprile	Won	

=== Home media ===
What Maisie Knew was released on DVD and Blu-ray on August 13, 2013. Both editions include an audio commentary with the directors and a selection of deleted scenes.
