= SS Catterthun =

Cargo and passenger ship that sank in 1985 off the coast of Australia

Coordinates: 32°25.462′S 152°34.427′E

History

New South Wales
- Name: SS Catterthun
- Owner: Eastern and Australian Steamship Company
- Builder: William Doxford & Sons, Sunderland, England
- Launched: April 1881
- Fate: Wrecked, 8 August 1895

General characteristics
- Tonnage: 2,179 GRT; 1,406 NRT
- Length: 302 ft 3 in (92.13 m)
- Beam: 35 ft 5 in (10.80 m)
- Propulsion: 250 hp (186 kW) compound steam engine
- Sail plan: Schooner-rigged

SS Catterthun was a nineteenth-century cargo and passenger ship. It sank with considerable loss of life on the east coast of Australia in 1895.

== Early years ==
Catterthun was built at the Doxford shipyard in Sunderland, England, and launched in April 1881 for the Eastern and Australian Steamship Company. With an iron hull, it displaced 2,179 long tons (2,214 t) gross and was 92 metres (302 ft) long. Propulsion was supplied by a 250 hp twin cylinder engine powered by two coal-fired boilers.

The ship arrived in Australia in August 1881 having travelled via Suez, Singapore, China, and New Guinea under the command of Captain J. Miller. For several years, it plied between Australia and China, taking cargoes of gold to China and returning with tea. Approximately 40 passengers could be carried, and its crew were predominantly Chinese crew as well as some freed East African slaves.

== Final voyage ==
Catterthun left Sydney on 7 August 1895, bound for Hong Kong with several European passengers and a few dozen Chinese. The ship ran into a gale just after midnight near Point Stephens Lighthouse. A few hours later, near Seal Rocks, it hit a reef and was badly damaged.

Noting the amount of water in the hold, the captain ordered the preparation of the lifeboats but this information was not passed on to the passengers or most of the crew. The strong seas swept the captain and two crew off the deck as the lifeboats were being launched. The ship sank twenty minutes after hitting the reef. Fifty-four people lost their lives. One lifeboat with 26 survivors made it safely to shore with assistance from a local sailing boat. Rescue efforts were hampered by the bad weather, and two more crewmen were found two days later in a lifeboat.

== Salvage ==
Plans for the salvage of the gold cargo began almost immediately. The number of gold sovereigns on board was variously stated as being 8,000, 9,000, or as many as 11,000. The operation started in mid August 1895. Of the approximately 8,000 gold coins, over 1,000 were not found. It has been suggested that they may have been kept by the dive operators and not turned over to the owners.

In the 1960s and 70s, further attempts were made to find the missing gold, but these operations were (at least publicly) unsuccessful. The wreck now lies in 60 metres of water and is a popular dive site for recreational divers.
