= Multiple Sarcasms =

- Theatrical poster
- Directed by: Brooks Branch
- Written by: Brooks Branch; Linda Morris
- Produced by: Chris Bongirne
- Starring: Timothy Hutton; Mira Sorvino; Stockard Channing; Dana Delany; Chris Sarandon; Mario Van Peebles
- Cinematography: Jacek Laskus
- Edited by: Plummy Tucker
- Music by: George J. Fontenette
- Production company: Multiple Avenue Releasing
- Distributed by: Multiple Avenue Releasing
- Release dates: April 8, 2010 (Dallas International Film Festival); May 7, 2010 (United States)
- Running time: 97 minutes
- Country: United States
- Language: English

Multiple Sarcasms is a 2010 American drama film starring Timothy Hutton, Mira Sorvino, Stockard Channing, Dana Delany and Mario Van Peebles. It was sold at the European Film Market on February 6, 2009 and was released in the United States May 7, 2010.

== Plot ==
Gabriel (Timothy Hutton) is a man who, on the surface, has a perfect life: successful career as an architect, a beautiful wife, and a devoted young daughter. However, he realizes that he is not really happy. He decides to write a play about the sorry state of his life. After being fired from his job, he gets a pushy literary agent friend to represent him and starts writing. Eventually, his life does change.

== Cast ==
- Timothy Hutton as Gabriel
- Mira Sorvino as Cari
- Stockard Channing as Pamela
- Dana Delany as Annie
- Chris Sarandon as Larry
- Mario Van Peebles as Rocky
- Aileen Quinn as School Secretary
- Eric Sheffer Stevens as Gabriel (Stage)
- India Ennenga as Elizabeth
- Joan Jett as herself

== Reception ==
On the review aggregator website Rotten Tomatoes, 9% of 22 critics' reviews are positive. Metacritic, which uses a weighted average, assigned the film a score of 35 out of 100, based on 11 critics, indicating "generally unfavorable" reviews.
