= India Ennenga =

American actress

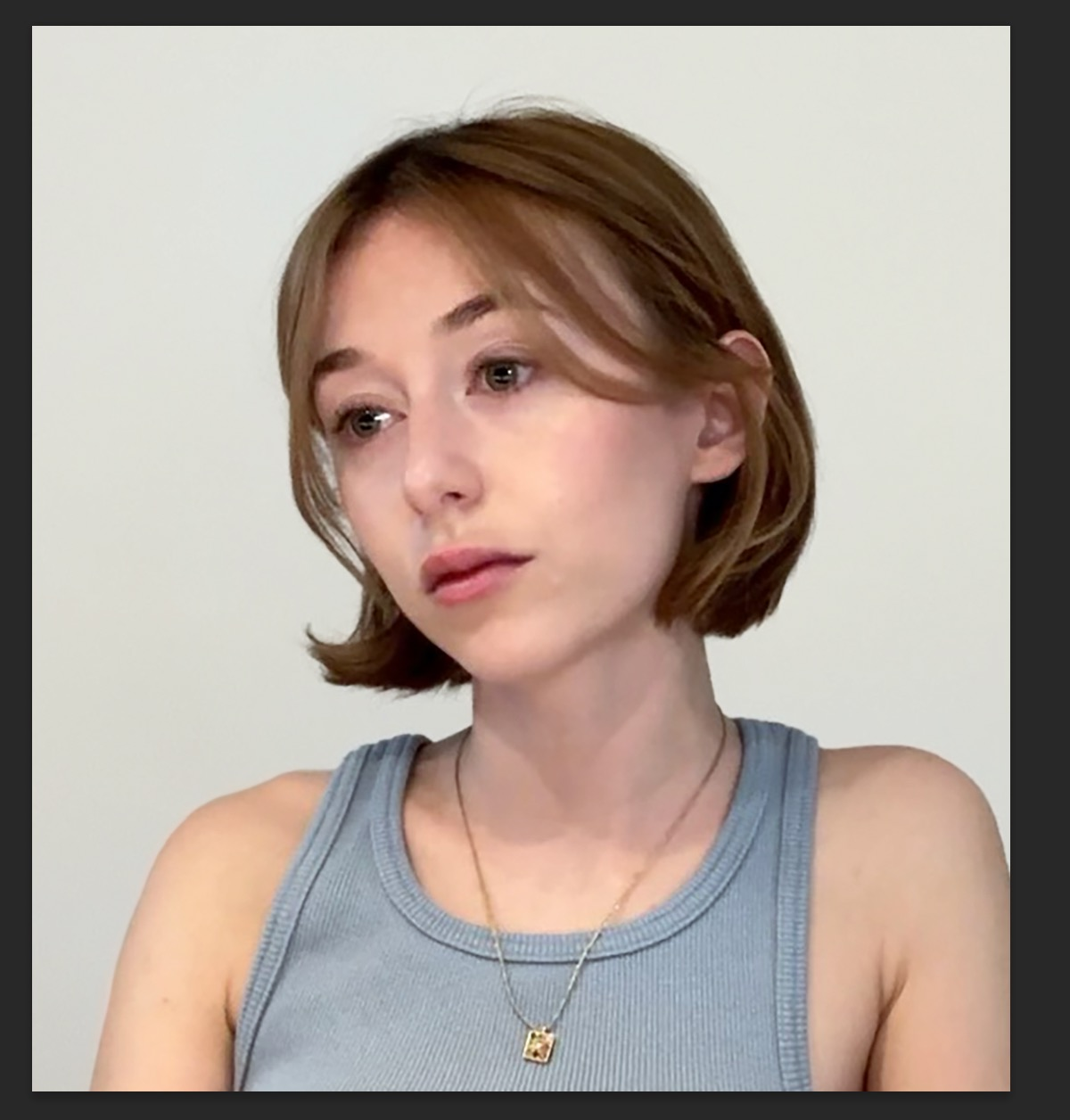
- Ennenga in 2024
- Born: New York City, New York, U.S.
- Education: Brown University
- Occupations: Editor; writer; actress; publisher
- Years active: 2002–present

India Ennenga is an American editor, writer, actress, and publisher. She is the co-founder of publishing company isolarii and served as its editor and has edited multiple books, magazines, and articles. As an actress, she is known for her roles as Sofia Bernette in the HBO series Treme, Camille Winship in the A&E drama The Returned and her cameo role in The Irishman.

== Early life and education ==
Ennenga was born in New York City. Her mother is filmmaker Laurie Weltz. She attended Saint Ann's School in Brooklyn, New York City. She attended Brown University, where she graduated cum laude with a bachelor of arts degree in Comparative Literature.

Later, Ennenga received professional training at London Academy of Music and Dramatic Art and an MFA in Creative Writing from New York University.

== Career ==
=== Writing ===
Ennenga is the author of multiple essays, interviews, and pieces of fiction that have been published in Pin-Up (magazine), The Believer (magazine), Document Journal, Verso Books, and Naima Publication, among others, including "Towards a More Radical Selfie", on social media, feminism and Mary Knowles, which was published in The Paris Review in November 2018.

=== Television ===
In 2006, Ennenga began her voice role as the title character in the animated series Pinky Dinky Doo. She later starred in the HBO series Treme as Sofia Bernette in 2010 and the A&E drama The Returned as Camille Winship in 2015. She starred in the Netflix series Inventing Anna as Julia Reed in 2022.

=== Film ===
Ennenga's first film role was as Sophie in The Last International Playboy. She then starred in the 2008 feature film The Women. She played Molly Haines, the daughter of Mary Haines (played by Meg Ryan). Other film credits include Multiple Sarcasms (2010), Nobody Walks (2012), Sun Belt Express (2014), About Scout (2015) and Charlie Says (2018).

She also appeared as Dolores Sheeran in Martin Scorsese's 2019 film The Irishman.

== Filmography ==
=== Film ===
Year	Film	Role	Notes	Ref(s)
2008	The Last International Playboy	Sophie		
2008	The Women	Molly Haines		
2010	Multiple Sarcasms	Elizabeth		
2012	Nobody Walks	Kolt		
2014	Sun Belt Express	Emily King		
2015	About Scout	Scout Havers		
2018	Charlie Says	Linda Kasabian		
2019	The Irishman	Dolores Sheeran		
2025	V13	Molly		

=== Television ===
Year	Show	Role	Notes	Ref(s)
2006–2009	Pinky Dinky Doo	Pinky	Main role	
2010–2013	Treme	Sofia Bernette	Series regular	
2015	The Returned	Camille Winship/Young Lena	Main role	
2018	Switch	Salome	5 episodes	
2022	Inventing Anna	Julia Reed	Episode 4: "A Wolf in Chic Clothing"	
