= From the Inside (Sophie Lowe song) =

Single by Sophie Lowe
- Released: 24 January 2023
- Genre: Indie pop
- Length: 3:55
- Label: SOLO Records
- Songwriter(s): Sophie Lowe, Neal Sutherland
- Producer(s): Neal Sutherland

Sophie Lowe singles chronology
"I Don't Want You Around" (2021)	"From the Inside" (2023)

Music video
- "From the Inside" on YouTube

"From the Inside" is a song by British-born Australian actress and singer-songwriter Sophie Lowe, released through her label SOLO Records on 24 January 2023. It's her first single in three years since "I Don't Want You Around" (2021).

== Background ==
"From the Inside" is an indie pop song written by Sophie Lowe and longtime collaborator Neal Sutherland, who also serves as the producer of the song. The track was released under Lowe's own record label SOLO records. While promoting the release of the song, Lowe tweeted some of the meaning behind the song:

Ever felt like you’re auditioning for someone else’s idea of you? Same. I don’t recommend it. STOP LOOKING AT ME FROM THE INSIDE ya listened yet?!

== Critical reception ==
The song was met with positive reviews. From Australian radio triple j Unearthed, community producer Abby Butler commented on the track: "From the 80s-esque production to the operatic vocal, this song is drenched in a smoky nostalgia that's giving Big Kate Bush Energy.", while music producer Sara Glaidous, compared the singer to American singer-songwriter Lana Del Rey stating: "This feels very old-world and cinematic. Giving a similar energy that Lana Del Rey provides when you can't quite pick if it's a pop song from 2023 or 1983 and that's what I appreciate about this the most."

== Music video ==
A music video for "From the Inside" was released the same day as the song worldwide to Lowe's YouTube channel. The music video was directed by Clare Hoey, produced by Hugh Stubbins and edited by Lowe herself. It features Lowe alongside Australian actor and model James Frecheville.

== Personnel ==
Credits adapted from Spotify.

- Sophie Lowe – songwriter, performer
- Neal Sutherland – songwriter, producer

== Release history ==
Release history and formats for "From the Inside"
Region	Date	Format	Version	Label	Ref.
Various	24 January 2023	Digital download; streaming	Original version	SOLO Records	
