= Sugarloaf Point Light =

Lighthouse in New South Wales, Australia

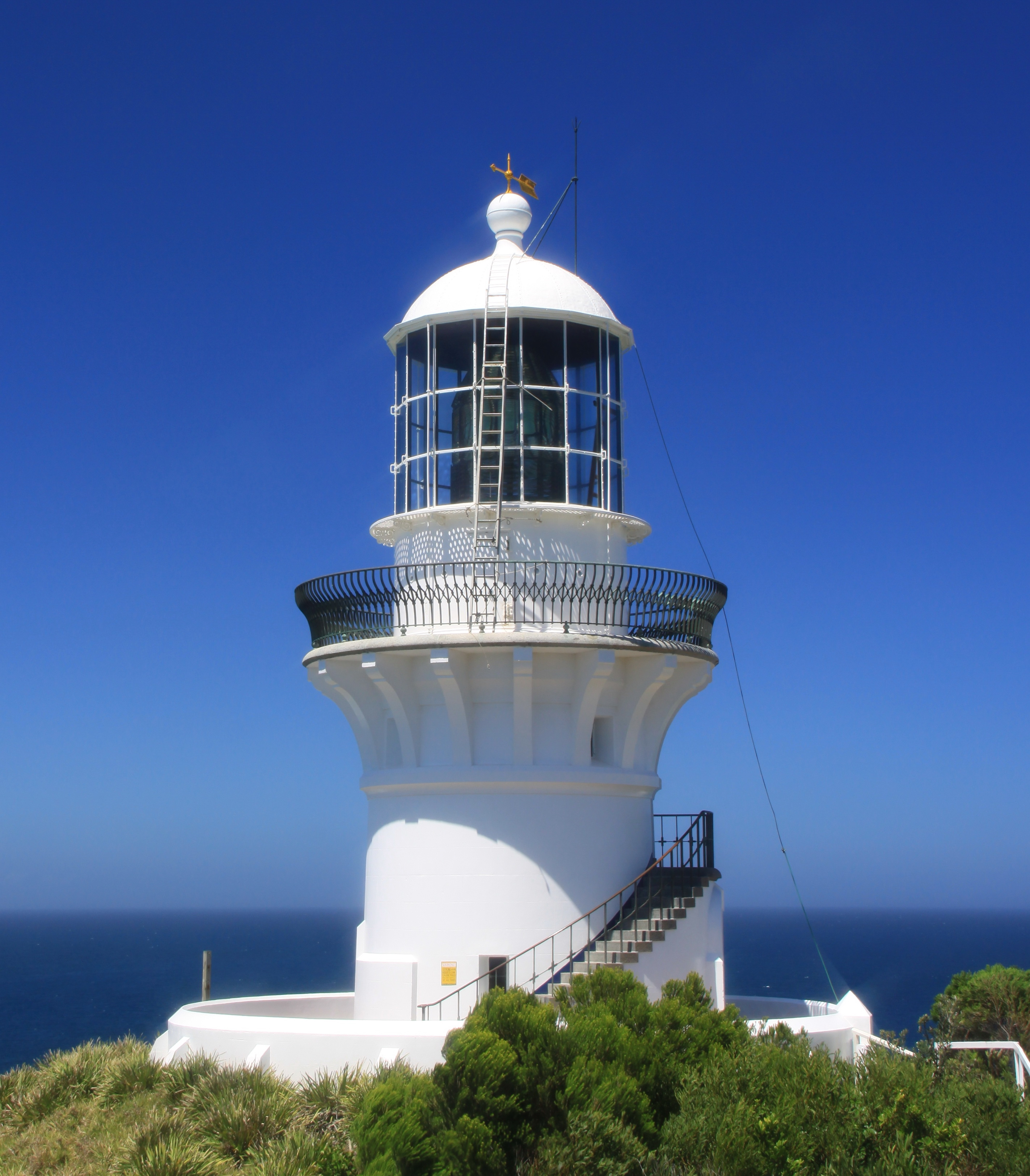
- Sugarloaf Point Lighthouse
- Location: Seal Rocks Road, Myall Lakes National Park, Seal Rocks, Mid-Coast Council, New South Wales, Australia
- Coordinates: 32°26′27″S 152°32′21″E

Tower
- Constructed: 1875
- Construction: Rendered brick tower
- Automated: 1987 (Note: Varying reports of the year of automation, ranging from 1987, to 1995 and 1997.)
- Height: 49 feet (15 m)
- Shape: Cylindrical tower with balcony and lantern, external spiral stairway
- Markings: White tower and lantern, black balcony rail
- Operator: Australian Maritime Safety Authority
- Heritage: listed on the Commonwealth Heritage List

Light
- Focal height: W. 258 feet (79 m); R. 240 feet (73 m)
- Lens: 1st order Chance Brothers Fresnel lens
- Light source: Mains power
- Intensity: 780,000 cd
- Range: White: 25 nautical miles (46 km; 29 mi). (Note: Also 22 nautical miles (41 km; 25 mi), though it might refer to an older light.); Red: 14 nautical miles (26 km; 16 mi)
- Characteristic: Fl W 7.5s.; F R (toward south)

Commonwealth Heritage List
- Official name: Sugarloaf Point Lighthouse, Seal Rocks Rd, Seal Rocks, NSW, Australia
- Type: Listed place
- Criteria: A., B., E., F., G., H.
- Designated: 22 June 2004
- Reference no.: 105602
- Class: Historic

New South Wales Heritage Register
- Official name: Sugarloaf Point Lightstation Group; Seal Rocks Lightstation Complex; Sugarloaf Point Lighthouse
- Type: State heritage (complex / group)
- Designated: 22 February 2019
- Reference no.: 2025
- Type: Light Station
- Category: Transport - Water
- Builders: John McLeod

Sugarloaf Point Light, also known as Seal Rocks Lighthouse, is an active lighthouse located on Sugarloaf Point, a point about 3 kilometres (1.9 mi) southeast of Seal Rocks, Mid-Coast Council, New South Wales, Australia. It guards Seal Rocks, a treacherous rock formation to the south. It is the first lighthouse designed by James Barnet, and built from 1874 to 1875 by John McLeod. It is also one of only two towers in Australia with an external stairway. It is also known as Sugarloaf Point Lightstation Group, Seal Rocks Lightstation Complex and Sugarloaf Point Lighthouse. The property is owned by National Parks and Wildlife Service. It was added to the Commonwealth Heritage List on 22 June 2004; on the New South Wales State Heritage Register on 22 February 2019; and on the (now defunct) Register of the National Estate on 10 April 1989.

The light is operated by the Australian Maritime Safety Authority, while the structures are maintained and operated by the Land and Property Management Authority. Sugarloaf Point is part of Myall Lakes National Park, managed by the National Parks and Wildlife Service. An unpaved road leads to the location and parking is provided. Although the tower is closed to the public, a nearby lookout provides good views.

== History ==
=== Early history ===
The Seal Rocks and Myall Lakes area is traditionally the land of the Worimi people whose territory stretches from Maitland and the Hunter River in the south; Forster-Tuncurry in the north; and Gloucester to the west. Evidence of the areas occupation by the Worimi people can be seen in the scarred trees, campsites, burial grounds, middens and rock engravings of the region. As with most Aboriginal groups in Australia prior to European colonisation, the Worimi people lived a traditional hunter-gatherer lifestyle that utilised the natural resources available in their environment and, being coastal people, the Worimi sought much of their food and resources from the ocean. The coastal environment also provided meeting places for the Worimi people and various sites in the region (both on land and water) are considered to be of mythological and spiritual importance.

European exploration into the Myall Lakes region commenced in the early 19th century and various industries were established with varying degrees of success. By the mid-19th century, shipping traffic along the Seal Rocks coastline was increasing rapidly and the potential hazards presented by the rocky outcrops of Sugarloaf Point and Seal Rocks were quickly realised. More generally, the entire NSW coastline had become regarded as dangerous to the shipping industry of the colony and, although the first lighthouse had been constructed at South Head in 1818, it was some 40 years before a systematic approach to the installation of coastal lighthouses was considered.

=== Development of a lighthouse ===
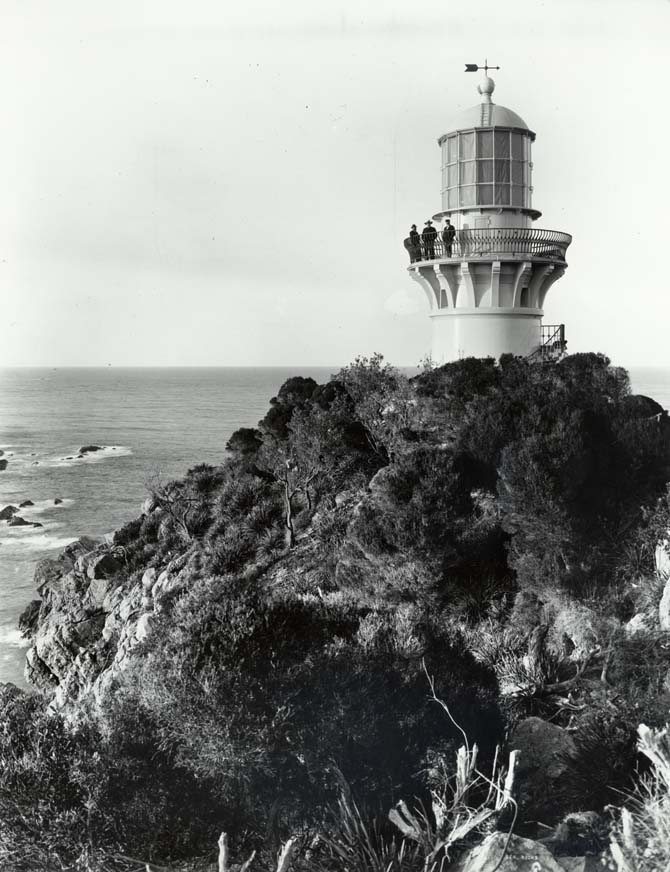
An historic view of Sugarloaf Point Lighthouse

The first recorded recommendation for building a lighthouse to guard Seal Rocks was made by a committee of the New South Wales Legislative Assembly in 1863. Attended by some of the most experienced Commanders of the coastal trade in the colony, the committee was the first to evaluate the navigational needs and requirements of the country as a whole. At the meeting, it was reported that "the great increase of the coasting' trade caused by the population sitting on the banks of our northern rivers, and by the rapid development of the new colony of Queensland, rendered an inquiry into tho (sic) facilities afforded for the safe navigation of urgent necessity".

Although there was no question of the recommendations of the committee with regard to the installation of a lightstation at Seal Rocks, it took another 10 years of negotiation to determine the most appropriate location for the light. Construction of a tower upon Seal Rocks itself was the most desirable option but off-shore locations were ultimately determined to be impossible to access for the purpose of construction.

Original intentions were to place the lighthouse on the Rocks, but because of access difficulties the location finally chosen in 1873 was Sugarloaf Point. On a site visit in 1873 with the Colonial Architect James Barnet, the President of the Marine Board of NSW Captain Francis Hixson formally adopted the headland summit of Sugarloaf Point as the location for the new lightstation. At this time, when the entire coastline and its navigational requirements were under review, Captain Hixson famously proclaimed "that he wanted the NSW coast "illuminated like a street with lamps" " (NPWS "Lighthouse Keeping (Part A)". Captain Hixson was ultimately successful in achieving his vision and, by the early 20th century, the "highway of lights" was complete with 25 coastal lighthouses and 12 harbour lighthouses built in NSW.

With Sugarloaf Point finally determined to be the location, Barnet set to work on plans for the tower and station and a tender was accepted from John McLeod in April 1874. Construction required building a 457-metre (1,500 ft) long jetty, which was used to land the 1,800 tonnes (1,800 long tons; 2,000 short tons) of supplies and materials required for the construction. Construction was completed in 1875 and the light was first lit on 1 December 1875. A road was also built to Bungwahl, leading to its development as a regional township, and a construction camp was established for the building phase (this camp was removed upon the completion of construction). The construction camp consisted of workers barrcks, contractors office, kitchen, store and school house.

Well-proportioned, even if on a smaller scale, with the curved detailed balcony, domed oil store and heavily bracketed upper balcony (design elements that were to become characteristic of Barnet's style as Colonial Architect), the two-storey tower was complemented by a suite of Barnet-designed mid-Victorian buildings, including a Head Keepers cottage, two Assistant Keepers cottages, signal house and paint store. To avoid the harsh elements of the coastal environment of Sugarloaf Point, the buildings were constructed below the lighthouse and on the southern side of the headland, nestled into a landscape cutting that sheltered the buildings and residents from the weather.

=== Operation ===
Within 18 months of the location being selected, the Sugarloaf Point Lightstation was complete and, on 1 December 1875, the lantern and 1st Order sixteen panel optic (sent from Messrs Chance Bros in Birmingham, England) was lit for the first time. Standing 200 feet (61 m) above the sea, the 15-metre (49 ft) tower shone its 50,000 candela white flashing light out into the night.

The original lens, still present, is a first order Chance Bros. sixteen-panel Fresnel lens dioptric. The original light source was a kerosene lamp with a light intensity of 122,000 cd. This was upgraded in April 1923 to a carbide lamp with an intensity of 174,000 cd.

In June 1966 the light was converted to electricity and the intensity raised to 1,000,000 cd. and automated in 1987, (Note: Varying reports of the year of automation, ranging from 1987, to 1995 and 1997.) though a caretaker remained on the site until 2006–2007, when the residence was renovated to be used for tourist accommodations. The last caretaker was Mark Sheriff, who was previously stationed in Green Cape Lighthouse.

The current light is a 120 V 1,000 W quartz halogen lamp, powered by mains electricity with a backup diesel generator. (Note: Counter-claim that it is solar powered, but no sign of this can be seen on the structure.) The light intensity is 780,000 cd, and the light characteristic shown is flashing white with a cycle of 7.5 seconds. Also showing is an additional fixed red light, with a similar 120 V 1,000 W quartz halogen lamp, visible to the south, over Seal Rocks and other dangers. This secondary light is positioned at a lower height, and was originally green, changed to red in the 1980s.

Throughout the 20th century, the Sugarloaf Point Lightstation underwent technical advancements, as did all lighthouses in Australia, and was converted from oil burning to vaporised kerosene in 1911 and then to electricity in 1966. The 1st order sixteen-sided lens remains the only one remaining in active service in Australia.

The station has been slowly de-staffed over its lifetime. Reduced from three on-site keepers to two in 1966 and the keepers withdrawn altogether when the light was automated in December 1987 (and a site caretaker installed), the station has become a tourist destination and is being increasingly recognised for its heritage values. Today, the lightstation forms an important element of the Myall Lakes National Park and its buildings have been adapted for use as short-stay holiday accommodation.

== Description ==
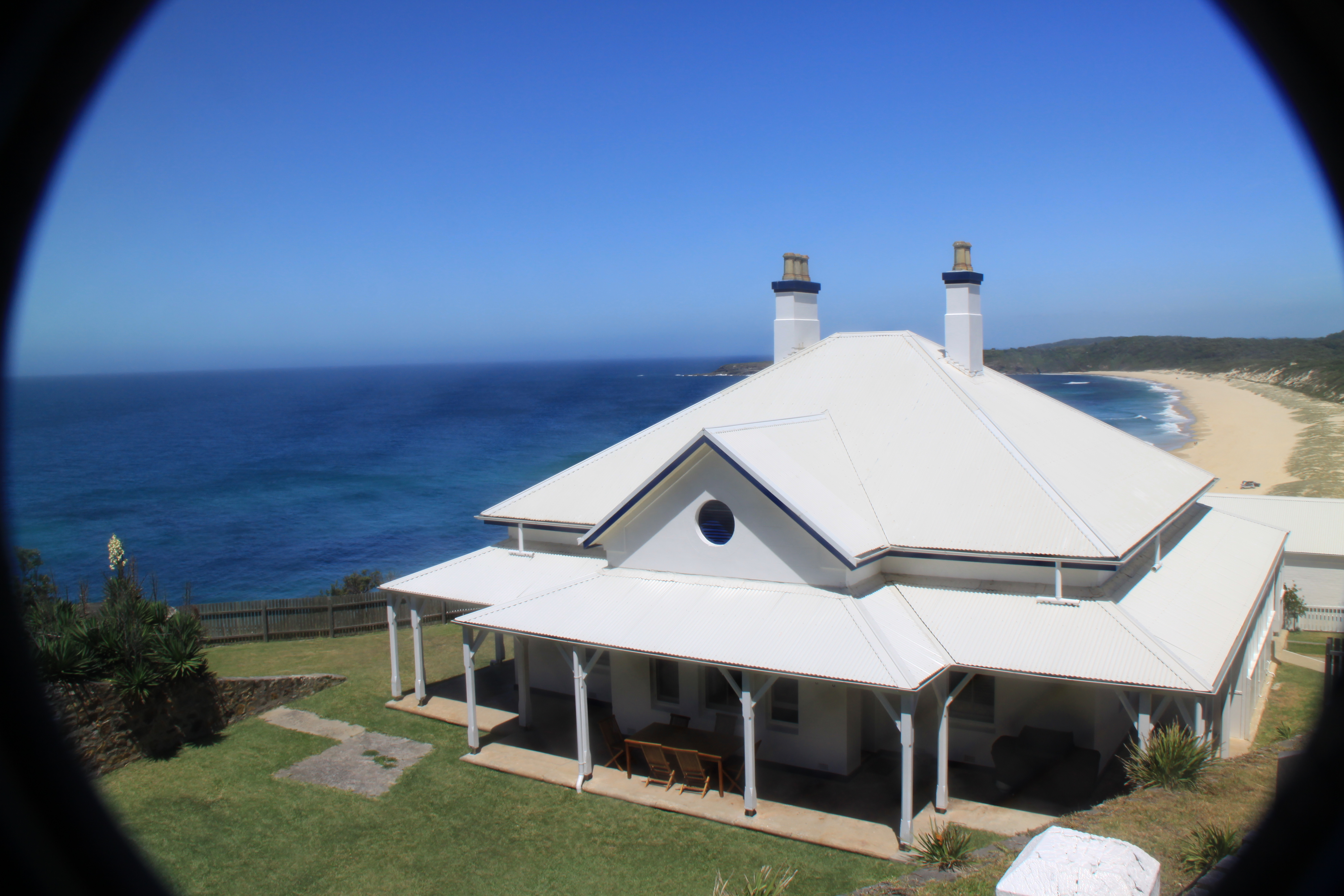
One of the renovated lighthouse keeper's houses near Sugarloaf Point Lighthouse

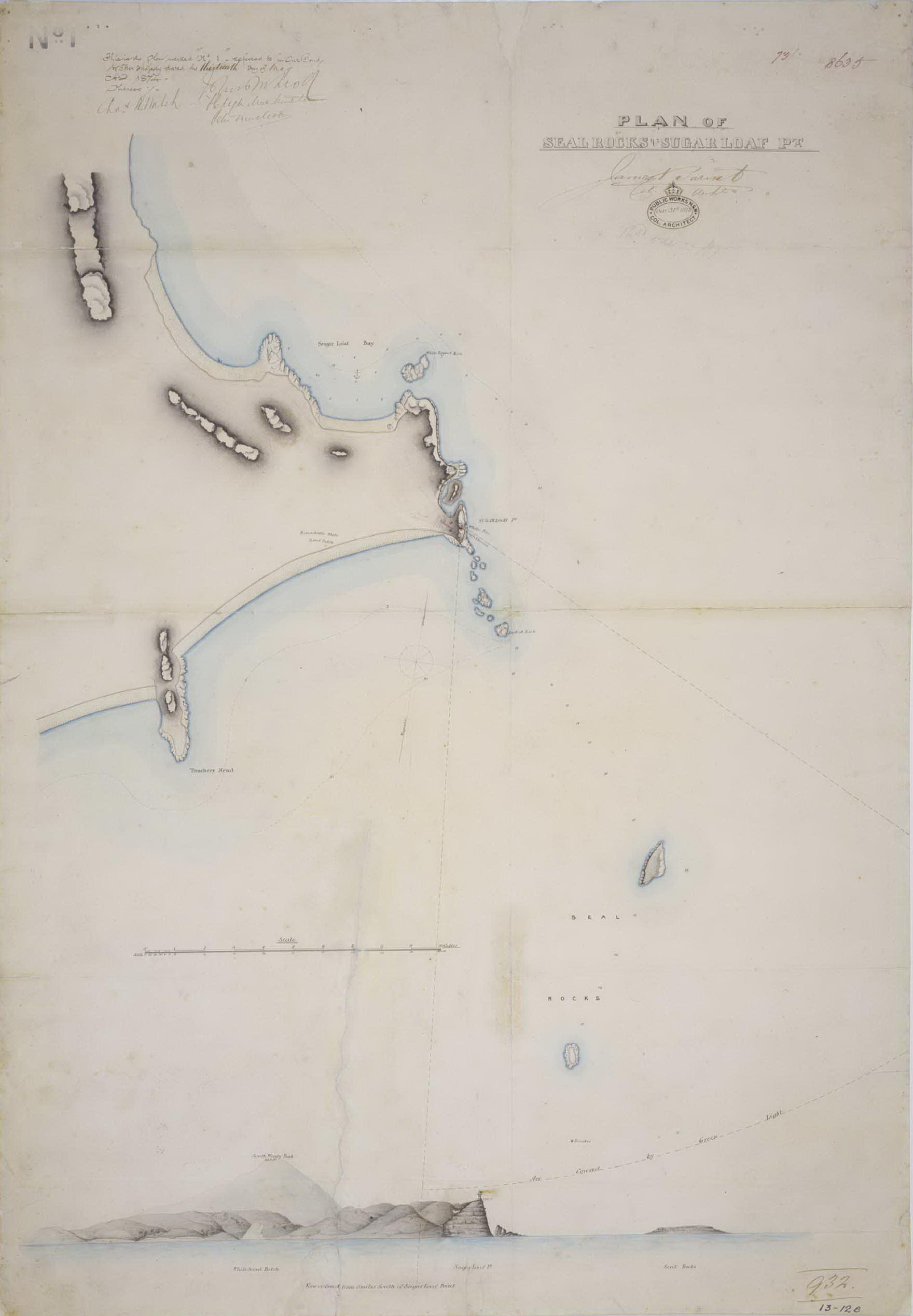
Plan of Seal Rocks & Sugarloaf Point, by James Barnet, 1873

Located within the Myall Lakes National Park and sited on an isolated but naturally prominent Seal Rocks headland, the Sugarloaf Point Lightstation consists of a mid-Victorian lighthouse and a complex of living quarters and operational buildings (including Head Keepers and Assistant Keepers Cottages, Signal House, Paint Store and Generator Building).

Standing 15 metres (49 ft) tall, the Sugarloaf Point Lighthouse is a small but well-proportioned tower that retains its original Messrs Chance Bros lantern. Divided into two storeys by a concrete floor that is accessible from a distinctive external flight of bluestone steps, the tower shaft is terminated by an external lantern gallery of bluestone slabs. The lantern room is reached by an internal flight of iron steps from the concrete first floor. Encircling the external gallery at lantern floor level is the curved balustrade and handrail in gun metal that became a design characteristic of James Barnet's architectural style. The domed oil store and heavily bracketed upper balcony also reflect Barnet's style.

The lighthouse is built bricks, cement rendered, and painted white. The tower has two stories, divided by a concrete floor, the fuel store being located on the ground level. An outside bluestone stairway reaches this floor, followed by internal iron stairs. The total height to the lantern room is 6.7 metres (22 ft). On top of the tower is a bluestone gallery, the projecting part being supported by concrete corbels, a Barnet design hallmark. The gallery has an elegant black gunmetal railing, another Barnet hallmark. The lantern roof is a copper dome. A brick-paved walkway surrounds the base of the tower, enclosed by a 1 metre (4 ft) high cement-rendered brick wall, painted white.

The Sugarloaf Point Lighthouse is complemented by a compact group of simple mid-Victorian buildings that are visually unified by alignment, scale, proportion and the use of common materials. To avoid the harsh elements of the coastal environment of Sugarloaf Point, the suite of station buildings were separated from the tower and constructed on the southern side of the headland, nestled into a landscape cutting that shelter the buildings from the weather. All buildings are constructed of blue and white painted cement rendered brickwork and are in very good condition. Near the lighthouse are the original Head Keeper's cottage and two semi-detached Assistant Keepers' cottages, designed by Barnet in 1875. The cottages were renovated in 2006 and are now used for overnight accommodations. North of the tower is a flag semaphore signal station. Next to it is the original concrete flagstaff base which retains some of the original iron fastenings. The flagstaff itself is recent. Other structures in the complex include a gabled roofed generator shed behind the Head Keeper's cottage, a painted brick workshop room behind the shed, a paint store to the north of the Assistant Keepers' cottages, and a garage.

=== Condition ===
As at 20 January 1998, the ongoing use of the site as a lighthouse and as a tourist destination has ensured that the site is maintained to a very good standard. Permanent caretakers in residence at the site see to its day-to-day maintenance.

Despite more recent alterations and modifications to kitchen and bathroom facilities to ensure the ongoing use of the site, the original detail and layout of the main buildings in the lightstation remains clearly evident today.

Although the lightstation buildings have undergone some modifications to support the ongoing use of the site, the original detail and layout of the buildings remains evident today.

As a complex, the integrity of the lightstation and its ability to demonstrate its history remains strong. This ability is reflected in its contemporary use as a tourist destination.

=== Modifications and dates ===
The most noticeable changes to the Sugarloaf Point Lightstation have been its ongoing adjustment to technological improvements. The lighthouse was converted from a Chance Bros multiple wick oil burner to vaporised kerosene mantle in 1911 with a further increase in intensity with the introduction of autoform mantles on 1 April 1923. The original Chance Bros roller bearing pedestal was replaced with the existing Commonwealth Lighthouse Service thrust bearing pedestal as part of the conversion to electricity on 14 June 1966. The auxiliary light located on the first floor showing over Seal Rocks utilises the original Chance Bros 4th order fixed lens and was converted from green to red on 6 December 1984. The station was fully automated in 1987. With this conversion, the lightstation was effectively de-staffed and a caretaker installed at the site.

The lightstation complex has also undergone minor changes. The layout of each of the residential buildings remains largely unaltered but the facilities have been updated. Recent modifications to the site include the conversion of the Head Keepers and Assistant Keepers Quarters to short term accommodation facilities.

In 2006, the National Parks and Wildlife Service undertook emergency and essential maintenance and repair works (including stabilisation of the built elements; removal of intrusive constructions and changes; and updating of services and facilities).

== Heritage listing ==
As at 13 November 2003, constructed and lit in 1875, the Sugarloaf Point Lightstation Group is of state heritage significance as the first major lightstation in the "highway of lights", a system of navigational aids installed along the NSW coastline in the mid-to-late 19th century. Important to the safe passage of shipping in NSW, the system of lightstations has a collective significance that reflects the logistical management for installing coastal infrastructure and the technical evolution of the stations.

The Sugarloaf Point Lightstation Group is of state heritage significance for its association with Colonial Architect, James Barnet, and President of the Marine Board of NSW, Captain Francis Hixson. The first major lightstation designed by Barnet as Colonial Architect (1865-1890), Sugarloaf Point Lightstation Group was the forerunner to his other major lighthouse constructions and it contains many of the stylistic design elements (including the domed oil store, heavily bracketed upper balcony and curved balcony railings) that were to become notable characteristics of his architectural style. The appearance of the external staircase and landing, however, are a noteworthy deviation in Barnet's design approach.

Built and archaeological elements associated with the design, construction, early operation and occupation of the site as a lightstation are also of state heritage significance. Sugarloaf Point Lightstation was listed on the New South Wales State Heritage Register on 22 February 2019 having satisfied the following criteria.

The place is important in demonstrating the course, or pattern, of cultural or natural history in New South Wales.

Constructed and lit in 1875, the Sugarloaf Point Lightstation Group is of state heritage significance as the first major lightstation in the "highway of lights" that was erected along the NSW coastline during the mid-to-late 19th century. Although it was not the first lighthouse erected in the state (this being Francis Greenway's 1818 Macquarie Light at Sydney's South Head), Sugarloaf Point Lightstation was the first major station complex to be constructed in NSW in response to the inaugural complete and thorough analysis of the navigational requirements for Australia's coastline in 1863. At the time of its completion, the Sugarloaf Point Lightstation was also the most expensive station at the time and its final cost of 18,973 pounds reflects the colony's commitment to the installation of navigational aids along the NSW coastline. The Sugarloaf Point Lightstation Group is also of state heritage significance as the first major lightstation designed by James Barnet as Colonial Architect (1865-1890). The forerunner to his other major lighthouse constructions, the design of the Sugarloaf Point complex and many of its features were to become notable characteristics of Barnet's architectural style.

The place has a strong or special association with a person, or group of persons, of importance of cultural or natural history of New South Wales's history.

The Sugarloaf Point Lightstation Group is of state heritage significance for its association with Colonial Architect, James Barnet, and President of the Marine Board of NSW, Captain Francis Hixson. As Superintendent of Pilots, Lighthouses and Harbours in NSW and President of the Marine Board of NSW, Captain Hixson dominated marine services in NSW from 1863 until the end of the 19th century. At the 1863 conference of the Principal Officers of Marine Departments of the Australian Colonies, Captain Hixson proclaimed that he wanted the NSW coastline "illuminated like a street with lamps" (NPWS "Lighthouse Keeping (Part A)", p15). The systematic construction and installation of navigational aids along the NSW coastline in the mid-to-late 19th century can be attributed to the leadership of Captain Francis Hixson. Unlike most of the country, the consistency in the design of lightstations in NSW is credited to James Barnet during his service as Colonial Architect from 1865-1890. As head of public architecture, Barnet was responsible for the design of more than a dozen lighthouses along the NSW coastline, constructed in the mid-to-late 19th century. The Sugarloaf Point Lightstation Group, although the third station built under Barnet's direction, is considered to be the first major lightstation design of his career as Colonial Architect. With a final cost of 18,973 pounds, the Sugarloaf Point Lightstation Group was the most expensive and substantial navigational aid in the state at the time.

The place is important in demonstrating aesthetic characteristics and/or a high degree of creative or technical achievement in New South Wales.

Located within the Myall Lakes National Park and sited on an isolated but naturally prominent Seal Rocks headland, the Sugarloaf Point Lighthouse is a small but well-proportioned tower that reflects the consistent architectural design of Colonial Architect James Barnet. With its domed oil store, heavily bracketed upper balcony and curved balcony railings, the two-storey lighthouse demonstrates the architectural style used extensively by the Colonial Architect in the late 19th century. Retaining its original Messrs Chance Bros lantern and distinctive external staircase, the Sugarloaf Point Lighthouse is complemented by a compact group of simple mid-Victorian buildings (including Head Keepers and Assistant Keepers Cottages) that are visually unified by alignment, scale, proportion and the use of common materials. To avoid the harsh elements of the coastal environment of Sugarloaf Point, the suite of station buildings were separated from the tower and constructed on the southern side of the headland, nestled into a landscape cutting that shelter the buildings from the weather.

The place has a strong or special association with a particular community or cultural group in New South Wales for social, cultural or spiritual reasons.

Despite its isolated location, the Sugarloaf Point Lightstation has layers of social significance. For 91 years (until the station was converted to electricity in 1966), the lightstation was permanently staffed by a Head Keeper, two Assistant Keepers and up to three families at any one time. Maintaining the light was of paramount importance to their experience of Sugarloaf Point. Additionally, their lives were inextricably linked to the landscape and ultimately shaped by the natural elements - the water, the cliffs and the native flora and fauna. The Seal Rocks and Myall Lakes locality is also a significant area of the Worimi people. Evidence of the areas occupation by the Worimi people, particularly at Sugarloaf Point, can be seen in the campsites and middens of the region. As with most Aboriginal groups in Australia prior to European colonisation, the Worimi people lived a traditional hunter-gatherer lifestyle that utilised the natural resources available in their environment and, being coastal people, the Worimi sought much of their food and resources from the ocean. The coastal environment also provided meeting places for the Worimi people and various sites in the region (both on land and water) are considered to be of mythological and spiritual importance.

The place has potential to yield information that will contribute to an understanding of the cultural or natural history of New South Wales.

Within the Sugarloaf Point Lightstation Group, there are opportunities to uncover further heritage values that are of state heritage significance. Elements associated with the design, construction, early operation and occupation of the site as a lightstation are of state heritage significance. Archaeological remnants of the construction camp (which only existed during the 1874-75 construction period) remain on the site and are considered to be of state significance. The site also has the ability, more broadly, to demonstrate the occupation of the area by the Worimi people prior to European occupation. There is recorded evidence in the area of middens and camp sites and there is further scope to elaborate on these investigations of Aboriginal cultural heritage values to reveal new information.

The place possesses uncommon, rare or endangered aspects of the cultural or natural history of New South Wales.

Built in 1875, the Sugarloaf Point Lightstation Group is the first major lightstation designed by James Barnet during his career as Colonial Architect (1865-1890). Amongst Barnet's lightstations in NSW, there is a consistency in design with recurring elements (particularly the presence of curved detailed balconies, domed oil stores and heavily bracketed upper balconies) that are common characteristics of his architectural style. At Sugarloaf Point, the tower includes an external staircase and landing from its base to first floor that is considered to be a rare element of a Barnet lightstation and a notable deviation from his consistent lightstation design.

The place is important in demonstrating the principal characteristics of a class of cultural or natural places/environments in New South Wales.

The Sugarloaf Point Lightstation Group is of state heritage significance as a representative station along NSW's "highway of lights", a system of navigational aids installed along the coastline in the mid-to-late 19th century. Important to the safe passage of shipping in NSW, the system of lightstations has a collective significance that reflects the logistical management for installing coastal infrastructure and the technical evolution of the stations. There is also an architectural coherency between lightstations across NSW, particularly those designed by James Barnet as the Colonial Architect (1865-1890). As a representative example, the design and compact nature of the building group at Sugarloaf Point reflects the typical layout of regional lightstation complexes around Australia.

== See also ==
- List of lighthouses in Australia
