= Road Kill (2010 film) =

Australian horror film

Road Train
- Australian theatrical release poster
- Directed by: Dean Francis
- Written by: Clive Hopkins
- Produced by: Michael Robertson
- Starring: Xavier Samuel; Bob Morley; Georgina Haig; Sophie Lowe
- Cinematography: Carl Robertson
- Edited by: Rodrigo Balart
- Music by: Rafael May
- Production companies: ProdigyMovies; Screen Australia; The South Australian Film Corporation
- Distributed by: Polyphony Entertainment
- Release date: 28 May 2010
- Running time: 90 minutes
- Country: Australia
- Language: English

Road Train, known as Road Kill in the United States, is a 2010 Australian horror film directed by Dean Francis and written by Clive Hopkins. It stars Xavier Samuel, Bobby Morley, Georgina Haig, and Sophie Lowe.

== Plot ==
Marcus (Xavier Samuel), his best friend Craig (Bobby Morley), and their friends, Liz (Georgina Haig) and Nina (Sophie Lowe) are touring the Australian outback. On the first night Craig and Nina make love in one tent while Liz in the other wants some of the same sort of action but Marcus, who is in love with Nina, ignores her. Later in the day they are deliberately nudged by a road train, resulting in a duel which ends when their Jeep Cherokee is pushed off the road and totally wrecked. Craig, who was driving, suffers a compound arm fracture but the others escape injury. They are miles from anywhere on a lonely desert road but they notice the truck has stopped some distance ahead. The group approaches it, but the driver is nowhere to be found. The prime mover has a distinctive mascot: a three-headed wolf, cast in silver. Distant gunshots are heard, and a crazed figure in the bush screams and runs towards them. Panicked, they commandeer the vehicle and Marcus drives away. The truck's radio turns on by itself and they can't silence the grinding music. After all four fall asleep, the truck veers off the road and up a hill. When they wake up, Nina looks after Craig while Liz leaves to search for a shack she's seen. Unable to start the truck, Marcus accompanies Liz.

Nina discovers the truck's fuel tanks are empty, but finds a large pipe underneath the trailer, filled with a viscous red fluid. Craig, tormented by visions of the hellhound Cerberus, finds a key to the trailers. He opens and enters the rearmost trailer, only for the door to close itself behind him. Marcus and Liz have an argument over her having slept with Craig, causing Liz to storm off. Marcus stays on the road and has a run-in with the truck's driver, who shoots himself. Liz locates the rundown shack, where she finds unlabeled cans containing the red fluid. Thirsty, she takes a swig but quickly runs back to the truck after finding bloody remains. Craig emerges from the trailer, his wounds healed and wearing a strange expression.

Liz and Nina try to start the truck, but Marcus, now wearing the driver's clothes and carrying his handgun, shoots at it. The women overpower and tie him up. Craig emerges from the trailer and kills Marcus. The truck starts up again, and Nina tries to back it up. Liz stands at the rear to signal Nina, but eventually leaves to drink more red fluid. Nina, unable to see Liz, exits the cab and sees Craig, who tries to lure her into the rear trailer. Hearing Liz crying for help from inside, she pushes Craig in and locks the door. Nina, finding skills she never knew, turns the truck around, and returns to the highway; she stops and examines the front trailer. To her horror, she discovers it is an abattoir where human bodies, including Marcus's, are ground into the red fluid that fuels the truck. Shocked, she returns to the cab and keeps driving.

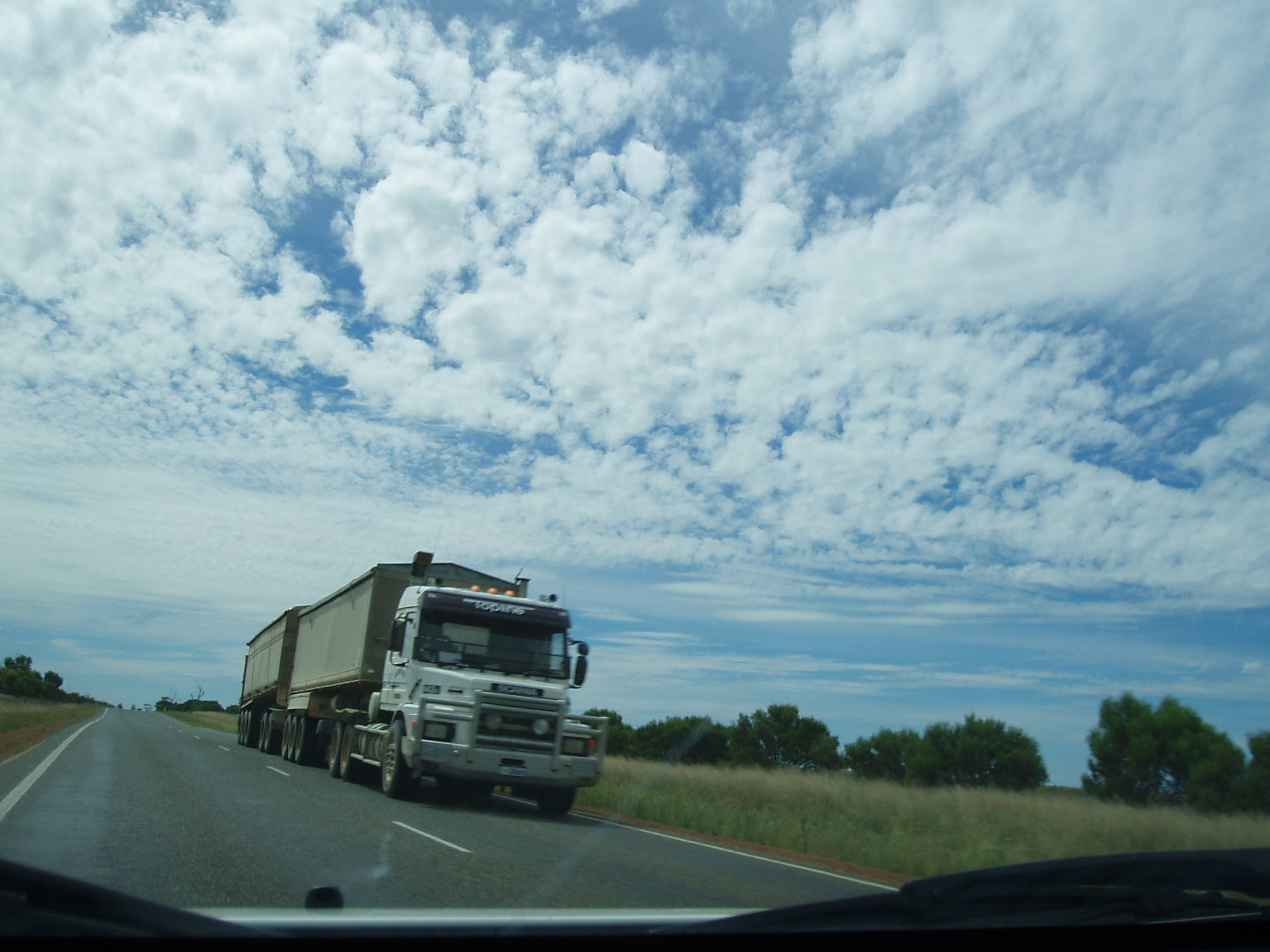

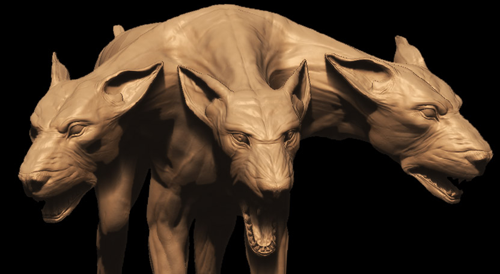

Back on the highway, Nina spots a car pulling a caravan and signals them for help. The truck radio turns on again, distracting Nina long enough for Craig and Liz to break into the cab. As the three fight, Craig rams the truck into the van. Liz is thrown from the cab by Nina, who is then knocked out. When Nina awakens, she finds Craig dragging Liz's body to the front trailer. He tries to persuade her to help, rambling of a "magnificent opportunity". Nina instead flees, but Craig slams her head on the side of the cab. He drags her into the trailer, but she manages to defend herself and flees into the bush. Craig pursues and catches Nina, but she kills him with the truck driver's gun. As Nina emerges from the bush, she spots the couple from the wrecked car examining the truck. She runs toward them, screaming warnings. The couple, having been run off the road, hearing distant gunshots, and seeing a screaming figure running towards them, commandeer the truck and drive off, leaving Nina to watch in horror as the bloody cycle repeats itself.

== Cast ==
- Xavier Samuel as Marcus
- Bob Morley as Craig
- Sophie Lowe as Nina
- Georgina Haig as Liz
- David Argue as Psycho

== Production ==
Road Kill was shot in Adelaide, South Australia and Flinders Ranges. Michael Robertson produced the film for ProdigyMovies, Screen Australia and The South Australian Film Corporation.

== Release ==
The film premiered at the Dungog Film Festival. Road Train was re-titled in the US as Road Kill. The US premiere had the film as part of the Fangoria Fright Fest on 22 June 2010. It is set to be released by Lightning Entertainment on 6 August 2010 in the United States via DVD, Video on Demand and Digital download. The film was released in the United Kingdom on 30 August 2010.

== Reception ==
In a negative review, Dread Central wrote, "Despite a promising beginning with potentially interesting characters and a creepy, intimidating concept (a sinister road train), Road Kill squanders its potential by hurling itself off the rails, descending into rank absurdity." The Australian was more positive, comparing it to an early Steven Spielberg film, Duel, and noting the promise of the filmmakers.

== Soundtrack ==
The score was composed by Australian filmmusic artist Rafael May.

== See also ==
- Cinema of Australia
- Upír z Feratu and Blood Car, two films about cars that use blood for fuel
- Blood Drive, a TV series centered on a road race with cars that use blood for fuel
