= Sophie Lowe =

Australian actress and singer-songwriter (born 1990)

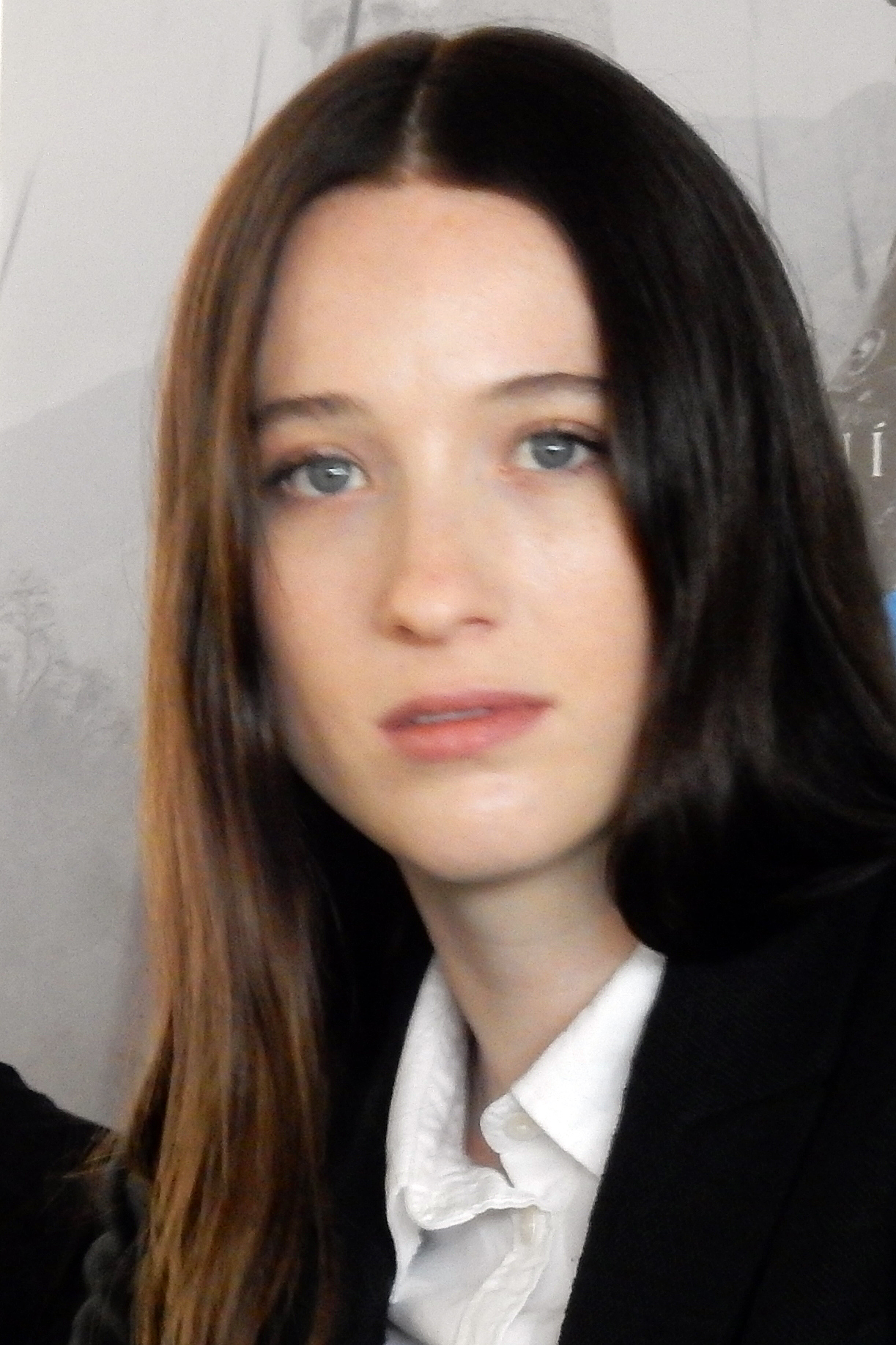
- Lowe in 2018
- Born: 1990 (age 35–36); Sheffield, South Yorkshire, England
- Education: The McDonald College (2008)
- Occupations: Actress; singer; songwriter
- Years active: 2000–present

Sophie Lowe (born 1990) is an Australian actress, singer, and songwriter. She is known for appearing in films such as Beautiful Kate, Adore, Road Kill, Above Suspicion, and Blow the Man Down, and starring in the television series Once Upon a Time in Wonderland, The Slap, The Returned, and The Beautiful Lie.

== Early life ==
Sophie Lowe was born in 1990 in Sheffield, Yorkshire, England, and moved to Australia with her parents and brother in 2000. In her early teens, she signed to Chadwick Models but quit modelling in favour of dancing and then acting.

She attended The McDonald College for later high school years, graduating in 2008. It was there that she decided to switch from modelling to acting as a career.

== Career ==
=== Acting ===
Lowe's first roles were in short films, including Kindle and Mirage, which was screened at the Montreal World Film Festival, roles undertaken while still attending high school. She also appeared in a number of television advertisements during her high school years.

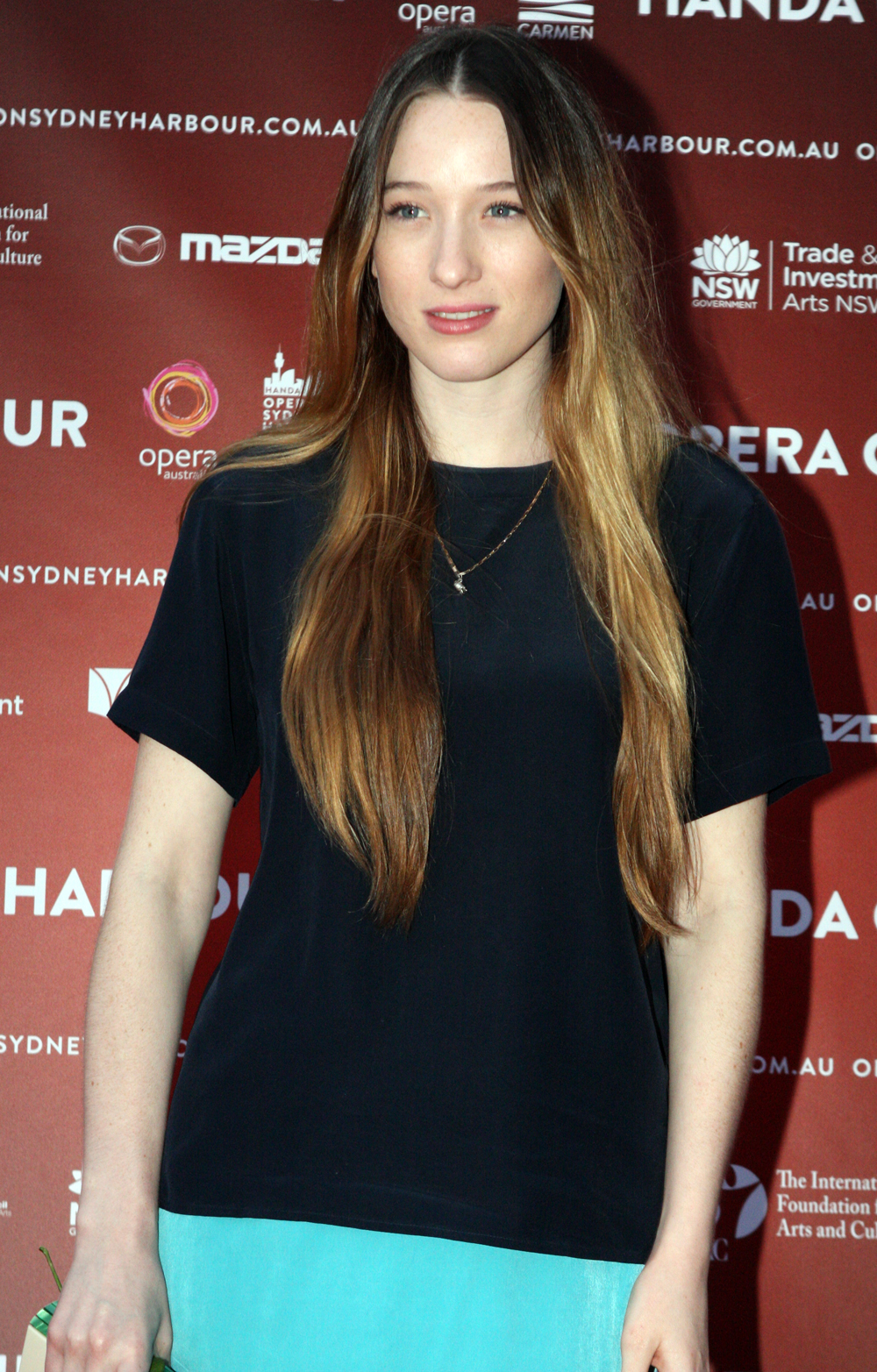
Lowe in 2013

Lowe's first substantial role was as the lead, Kate, in Rachel Ward's 2009 film Beautiful Kate, in which she played opposite Ben Mendelsohn. For her role in Beautiful Kate, she was nominated for an AFI Award for Best Lead Actress. Her other credits include Natalie in the thriller film Blame, which was released in 2010. Blame was screened and received accolades at Cannes Film Festival, Melbourne International Film Festival, the 35th Toronto International Film Festival, the 47th Chicago International Film Festival and Buenos Aires International Film Festival of Independent Cinema.

In 2013, Lowe and her fellow McDonald College alumnus Rhys Wakefield co-wrote, co-directed, and starred in the short film A Man Walks into a Bar... The film was a finalist at Sydney's Tropfest short film festival. Lowe and Wakefield previously worked together in the 2013 film After the Dark.

From 2013 to 2014, Lowe starred as Alice in Once Upon a Time in Wonderland, a spin-off of the TV series Once Upon a Time. The series ended after one season.

Lowe played Lena in the 2015 American TV series The Returned. Also in 2015, she starred in The Beautiful Lie, an Australian television series broadly based on Leo Tolstoy's novel Anna Karenina, playing Kitty Ballantyne, and filmed Waiting for the Miracle to Come, the feature film debut of Australian documentary filmmaker Lian Lunson.

In 2016, she joined the independent Australian film Bloom, and Philip Noyce's thriller Above Suspicion.

In 2022, she starred in the Czech period drama film, Medieval, alongside Ben Foster. The film was directed by Petr Jákl and became the most expensive Czech film ever made. She appeared alongside actress Louisa Krause in the German-Maltese thriller film 2023 film The Dive.

Lowe plays the lead role as Zoe in the 2026 film Posthumous, which had its world premiere in Fantastic Fest on 19 September 2026. Also in 2026, she plays a renowned pianist named Anna in the folk horror feature debut by Johanis Lyons-Reid, Lucrum, along with Nathan Page and Tahlia Sturzaker. The film, made under the SAFC's Film Lab: New Voices initiative, premiered on 23 October 2026 at the Adelaide Film Festival. The film was also a debut production for the South Australian Dinosaur Disco Films, run by Lilla Berry, Johanis Lyons-Reid, Pearl Berry, and Piri Eddy.

=== Music ===
Lowe is also a singer-songwriter, originally performing under the alias SOLO. In December 2013, she released a five-song EP via the online music retailer Bandcamp. The music video for the song "Dreaming", one of the songs from the SOLO EP, was directed by actress and After the Dark co-star Bonnie Wright. She later dropped the SOLO name and performed under her real name. In October 2015, she re-released independently her first record as Sophie Lowe, titled EP1. On the next month, in November 2015, she released her second EP titled EP2, with seven songs. Her second extended play saw a departing of her Alt-folk sound, with EP2 embracing a more Electropop production while remaining as an Alternative record. To promote the project, Lowe released three singles; "Understand", "Pink Flowers" and "Breathe", the first two end up getting a respective music video. As 2020, the music video for "Understand" directed by Dean Francis, is no longer available to stream on her YouTube page. The music video for "Pink Flowers" was co-directed by Lowe herself and Lily Rolfe.

Lowe said in October 2015 she had a two-fold focus: when she had free time between acting, she tried to do as much music as she could. However, she would not give up acting for a musical career. In 2016 she released a collaboration with TWINKIDS titled, "Mean", with the music video being directed by Patrick Fileti and herself. In the same year, she starred in the music video from Australian electronic producer Flume and Canadian singer Kai, titled "Never Be Like You" alongside actor Sam Reid. In October 2017, she released the single, "Trust", which was featured on TV series The Bold Type and Charmed. In September 2018, she released the single "Taught You How To Feel". The music video was directed by Bonnie Wright, making this her second collaboration, since the single "Dreaming" in 2013.

On 11 May 2021, Lowe released the single "I Don't Want You Around", with the music video directed and edited by herself. Her Indie pop song "From the Inside" was released on 24 January 2023 alongside the official music video, which co-stars fellow Australian actor and model James Frecheville.

== Personal life ==
In 2018, it was confirmed that Lowe was dating Australian singer-songwriter Vance Joy, after he thanked and called her, "My girlfriend Sophie" in his acceptance speech at the ARIA Music Awards. The relationship ended a few years later.

Lowe has dyslexia.

== Awards and nominations ==
Year	Award	Category	Work	Result	Ref.
2009	AFI Award	Best Lead Actress	Beautiful Kate	Nominated	
2010	FCCA Award	Best Supporting Actor - Female	Beautiful Kate	Nominated	
2010	Screen Music Award	Best Original Song Composed for the Screen (shared with: Rafael May)	A Runner (from Road Kill)	Nominated	
2011	Equity Ensemble Awards	Most Outstanding Performance by an Ensemble in a Television Movie or Miniseries (shared with Ensemble)	The Slap	Won	

== Discography ==
=== Extended plays ===
- EP 1 (2015)
- EP 2 (2015)

== Filmography ==
=== Feature films ===
Year	Title	Role	Notes
2009	Beautiful Kate	Kate Kendall	
2009	Blessed	Katrina	
2010	Road Train	Nina	aka Road Kill
2010	The Clinic	Allison	
2010	Blame	Natalie	
2013	Adoration	Hannah Weston	aka Adore and Perfect Mothers
2013	After the Dark	Petra	Originally titled The Philosophers
2013	Autumn Blood	The Girl	
2015	What Lola Wants	Lola	
2017	The Butterfly Tree	Shelley	
2018	Waiting for the Miracle to Come	Adeline Winter	
2019	Blow the Man Down	Priscilla Connolly	
2019	Above Suspicion	Kathy Putnam	
2022	Medieval	Catherine	
2023	The Dive	Drew	
2026	Posthumous	Zoe	Post-production

=== Short films ===
Year	Title	Role	Notes
2007	Kindle	Hayley	
2008	He. She. It.	Cassie	
2008	The Mirage	Deb	
2011	Kiss	Kristy	
2011	Moth	Heather	
2013	A Man Walks into a Bar...	Woman	Also writer & co-director
2015	The Nightingale and the Rose	Professor's Daughter (voice)	
2016	Love Yourself	Sophie Lowe	
2016	Tricks	Girl	
2019	Deluge	Floral	
2024	Showpony	The Girlfriend	Also executive producer & editor
2024	2004 Was Twenty Years Ago	Ali	Also executive producer

=== Television ===
Year	Title	Role	Notes
2005	Backyard Science	Young Scientist	Episode: "Moldy Meal"
2009	All Saints	Chloe Steen	Episode: "Test of Faith"
2010	Satisfaction	Kate	Episodes: "Big Crush" & "Lifesavers"
2011	The Slap	Connie	Main role; 8 episodes
2013	It's a Date	Vicky	Episode: "How Much Do First Impressions Count?"
2013–2014	Once Upon a Time in Wonderland	Alice	Main role; 13 episodes
2015	The Returned	Lena Winship	Main role; 10 episodes
2015	The Beautiful Lie	Kitty Ballantyne	Main role; 6 episodes
2018	Romper Stomper	Zoe Farron	Main role; 6 episodes

=== Music videos ===
Year	Title	Artist(s)	Role	Director
2016	Never Be Like You	Flume Kai	Lead Female	Clemens Habich
