= Jessica Jones season 2 =

Jessica Jones
- Season 2
- Promotional poster
- Showrunner: Melissa Rosenberg
- Starring: Krysten Ritter; Rachael Taylor; Eka Darville; J. R. Ramirez; Terry Chen; Leah Gibson; Carrie-Anne Moss; Janet McTeer
- No. of episodes: 13

Release
- Original network: Netflix
- Original release: March 8, 2018

Season chronology
- ← Previous; Season 1 Next → Season 3

The second season of the American television series Jessica Jones, which is based on the Marvel Comics character of the same name, follows Jones as she takes on a new case after the events surrounding her encounter with Kilgrave. It is set in the Marvel Cinematic Universe (MCU), sharing continuity with the films and other television series of the franchise. The season was produced by Marvel Television in association with ABC Studios and Tall Girls Productions, with Melissa Rosenberg serving as showrunner.

Krysten Ritter stars as Jones, with Rachael Taylor, Carrie-Anne Moss, and Eka Darville also returning from the first season, as well as Wil Traval and David Tennant in guest roles. They are joined by J. R. Ramirez, Terry Chen, Leah Gibson, and Janet McTeer. The second season was ordered in January 2016, with filming beginning in April 2017, back-to-back with the miniseries The Defenders. Filming concluded in September 2017.

The season was released on Netflix on March 8, 2018. It received mostly positive reviews from critics, who once again praised Ritter's performance and the series' female focus but felt the season suffered from pacing issues and a lack of a compelling villain after Tennant's Kilgrave from the first season. A third season of Jessica Jones was ordered on April 12, 2018.

== Episodes ==
No. overall	No. in season	Title	Directed by	Written by	Original release date
14	1	"AKA Start at the Beginning"	Anna Foerster	Melissa Rosenberg	March 8, 2018
Super-powered private investigator Jessica Jones has become known as a vigilante hero around New York City since she killed her tormentor Kilgrave. Trish Walker, Jones's best friend and adopted sister, attempts to convince Jones to investigate her past and IGH, the company that gave her abilities, but Jones is not interested. Walker is dealing with declining ratings for her radio show Trish Talk and sees her ex-boyfriend Will Simpson—who was also experimented on by IGH—following her. Pryce Cheng, another investigator, seeks to absorb Jones into his company at the request of lawyer Jeri Hogarth. When Jones attacks and injures Cheng, he plans to sue her with Hogarth, who is already facing a lawsuit from Pam, her former assistant and lover. Jones is approached by Robert Coleman, who calls himself "Whizzer" and was given superspeed by IGH. When he is killed in an apparent construction accident, Jones traces his medication to an abandoned building which she remembers being taken to and experimented on.
15	2	"AKA Freak Accident"	Minkie Spiro	Aïda Mashaka Croal	March 8, 2018
Jones goes to the home of Miklos Kozlov, the IGH doctor who had experimented on Simpson. She finds a shiva for Kozlov, who has died in a "freak accident". One of Kozlov's army patients believes that Simpson is behind this, and Jones suspects that he also killed Coleman. Walker asks Malcolm Ducasse, Jones's neighbor and work partner, to help her rather than further involve the reluctant Jones. Walker confronts Maximilian Tatum, a director, about the sexual relationship they had when she was a child actress working for him, threatening to publicly reveal this unless he helps her get access to records at a hospital he has influence over. After Tatum refuses, Walker runs into Simpson. Jones also arrives, having tracked Walker down when she did not answer her phone. Simpson claims that someone else who was experimented on by IGH has killed Kozlov and Coleman and that he is there to protect Walker, since she was noticed investigating IGH. This other person soon appears and kills Simpson while Jones gets Walker to safety.
16	3	"AKA Sole Survivor"	Mairzee Almas	Lisa Randolph	March 8, 2018
Hogarth is diagnosed with ALS, and her law-firm partners Steven Benowitz and Linda Chao plan to buy her out based on a clause in their contracts. Jones agrees to investigate the other partners to find blackmail material for Hogarth. Jones receives an eviction notice from her building's new superintendent Oscar Arocho, who fears Jones's abilities. She also discovers the name Leslie Hansen in the abandoned IGH building. Hansen was a doctor at the hospital where Jones was taken following the accident that killed her family. Jones and Walker find Hansen's apartment empty and a charred human head in the basement. Walker uses her radio show to ask the public for information on Hansen and receives a call from a woman claiming to be Hansen. Jones meets with her and learns that she died after the accident but was brought back to life by IGH; the superpowers were a side-effect. Jones angers the woman who escapes using abilities similar to Jones'. DNA analysis shows that the charred head belongs to the real Leslie Hansen.
17	4	"AKA God Help the Hobo"	Deborah Chow	Jack Kenny	March 8, 2018
Hogarth looks into ways to painlessly end her life, which her doctor does not support. Cheng fires Hogarth for no longer prioritizing him and his lawsuit, and he also offers Ducasse a job at his company; Ducasse turns down the role, and Jones promises to work with him better. Jones and Walker try to find out who the mysterious woman posing as Hansen was, and Jones scares Tatum into getting the IGH files from the hospital. In addition to Jones and Coleman, there is a file on Inez Green. They find her living on the streets, where she explains that she was a nurse at the hospital who was seriously injured by the mysterious woman. Jones and Walker promise to keep her safe. Cheng sends one of his men to steal all of Jones's research from her office, hoping to find something to use against her. The man is attacked by the mysterious woman, who tears him apart. When Jones arrives, she is arrested for the murder. Walker tries to help her using an IGH performance enhancer she took from Simpson but is also arrested. Ducasse takes Green to safety.
18	5	"AKA The Octopus"	Millicent Shelton	Jamie King	March 8, 2018
Jones spends a day at the police station before Hogarth convinces her to tell the truth. Detective Eddy Costa believes Jones and releases her with the promise that she will keep Costa informed of her investigation. Walker, bailed out by her mother, Dorothy, struggles with after-effects of using the IGH drug. Her new boyfriend Griffin Sinclair asks her to marry him, but Walker turns him down. She takes the IGH drug again. Ducasse takes Green to Hogarth, who agrees to protect her. Hogarth asks Green about IGH's experiments. Jones meets with David Kawecki, an inmate at a mental hospital serving time for the murder of Green's fellow nurse, who was actually killed by the mysterious woman. Jones learns of a shared interest in octopuses that Kawecki has with an IGH doctor and visits the aquarium. She recognizes the doctor, Karl Malus, in a new memory from after the accident. He meets with the mysterious woman, who upon discovering Jones surveilling them, smashes the glass enclosure of an aquarium in order to create a commotion to cover their escape.
19	6	"AKA Facetime"	Jet Wilkinson	Raelle Tucker	March 8, 2018
Walker becomes addicted to the IGH drug and starts looking for criminals to attack. Security footage from outside the aquarium shows Malus drugging the woman and forcing her to leave with him, despite the pair appearing to be a loving couple before. Jones sends Ducasse to his old university—where he was suspended for his previous drug habit—to investigate Malus; they learn of Justis Ambrose, who attended university with Malus and appears to have been paying for all his personal expenses for years. Jones confronts Ambrose, who explains that his son Eric was born with a fatal genetic defect which Malus cured with his experimental treatments. Eric appears to have no special abilities, and Jones threatens him to gain Malus' location. Green realizes that Hogarth has ALS and tells her that there was an IGH patient that could heal people by touching them, and he saved her life after the woman had attacked her. Jones goes to the location, where she finds Malus and the woman living together. The latter claims to be Jones's mother.
20	7	"AKA I Want Your Cray Cray"	Jennifer Getzinger	Hilly Hicks Jr.	March 8, 2018
Years earlier, after Brian Jones and his son Phillip are killed in an accident, his wife Alisa and daughter Jessica are rushed to hospital. Dr. Leslie Hansen secretly takes them to IGH. Jessica is saved and returned to hospital in 20 days, but Alisa's injuries are severe and her treatments take years, altering her looks and causing increased strength and extreme mood swings. Jessica is adopted by the Walkers but grows away from her foster family over time, especially after her adopted sister Trish becomes a drug addict at the beginning of her pop-star career. Intent on seeing Jessica, Alisa escapes IGH by killing a nurse and severely injuring Green. She finds Jessica living with a new boyfriend, Stirling Adams, but sees him apparently attempt to exploit her and kills him in a fit of rage. Returning to IGH, Malus promises Alisa that he will cure her of the side effects. Adams' death leads to Jessica re-connecting with Trish, helping her become sober. Now, Jessica refuses to forgive Alisa and attacks her; Malus renders Jessica unconscious with a sedative.
21	8	"AKA Ain't We Got Fun"	Zetna Fuentes	Gabe Fonseca	March 8, 2018
Trish has sex with Ducasse, and he notices that she has become addicted to the IGH drug. When she refuses to admit this, he leaves and decides to continue Jessica's investigation into Hogarth's partners. He discovers that Benowitz is secretly gay and frequents a gay bar unbeknownst to his wife. Ducasse tells Benowitz that Chao had hired him, and Benowitz gives Ducasse blackmail material that he has on her. Outside of the gay bar, Ducasse is attacked by homophobic thugs. Trish rescues him and gives him some of the IGH drug to help him heal, but it is too much for Ducasse and he runs off. Hogarth visits Shane Ryback (the man who can heal people with his hands) in prison, taking him on as a client. Jessica calls the police to Malus' house, and he flees. Alisa decides to stay with Jessica, hoping to prove that she is the same person who raised Jessica despite looking different and having extreme mood swings. They go to Jessica's apartment, where they are shot at from outside. Jessica is hit, enraging Alisa.
22	9	"AKA Shark in the Bathtub, Monster in the Bed"	Rosemary Rodriguez	Jenny Klein	March 8, 2018
Wanting revenge for the death of his man, Cheng tries to kill Alisa. Shooting at her from across the street, he only hits Jessica. Alisa races to find and kill Cheng, but Jessica is able to render him unconscious first and convinces Alisa to find a solution other than murder. Ryback is released from prison, and he attempts to heal Hogarth, but he cannot promise that it will work. During a live broadcast of her radio show, Trish, under the influence of the IGH drug, rails against the superficiality of her show's programming and quits. She is offered a desirable job on television but realizes that she has run out of the drug. Arocho, whose relationship with Jessica has become less hostile and more romantic, comes to Jessica when his ex-wife kidnaps their son Vido. Jessica and Alisa race to save Vido, using their abilities for good. Alisa sees the potential of a life with Jessica doing good like this but still wants to protect Jessica by killing Cheng and running away. Jessica frees Cheng and, when Alisa gives chase, she is confronted by police and surrenders to them.
23	10	"AKA Pork Chop"	Neasa Hardiman	Aïda Mashaka Croal	March 8, 2018
Hogarth arranges a plea deal for Alisa, where she can avoid the Raft, a superhuman prison, if she gives up Malus. Alisa agrees when Jessica promises to keep Malus safe. Trish struggles with withdrawals during her television audition, where she overhears that the super-powered killer has been caught. Jessica explains everything to Trish and Ducasse but tells them to stay away. She finds Malus and convinces him to go to a country with no extradition so Alisa can talk about him without fear of him being caught. He first waits for a new passport provided by Arocho, and he also tells Jessica that he never treated Ryback. Hogarth does not believe Jessica when she says this, but she arrives home to find Green and Ryback have robbed her (and thus realizes she was not cured). Trish and Ducasse decide to track down Malus themselves, while Jessica discovers that Alisa is being tormented by one of her guards, Dale Holiday. Investigating him, Jessica finds evidence that he has murdered inmates before. He attacks her, and she accidentally kills him in self-defense.
24	11	"AKA Three Lives and Counting"	Jennifer Lynch	Jack Kenny & Lisa Randolph	March 8, 2018
Jessica makes Holiday's death look like suicide, and she begins having hallucinations of Kilgrave. Trish knocks Ducasse out and restrains him, and she asks Malus to give her abilities like Jessica's. Jessica arrives with the passport from Arocho to give to Malus, to find him gone. She tracks them down just as Ducasse escapes, but Trish manages to get away with Malus. With Holiday dead, Alisa gets a new guard who treats her well. Jessica berates Ducasse for not trusting her and for taking advantage of their working relationship. They both agree that he should no longer work for her. Malus takes Trish to the old IGH facility, where he begins to put her through the same process that changed Jessica and Alisa. Jessica arrives and stops the procedure, and she is then almost convinced by her hallucination of Kilgrave to murder Malus. She stops herself, but he decides to end his own life. Malus destroys the facility with himself inside it, while Jessica gets Trish to the hospital. Alisa learns of Malus' death via a news report, kills her new guard and escapes from prison.
25	12	"AKA Pray for My Patsy"	Liz Friedlander	Raelle Tucker & Hilly Hicks Jr.	March 8, 2018
Alisa goes looking for Trish, blaming her for Malus' death. She terrorizes the Trish Talk studio, before seeing Trish's mother in an interview discussing why Trish is now hospitalized. She finds Jessica protecting Trish at the hospital but still attempts to kill Trish. When Costa and his partner Ruth Sunday arrive, they try to arrest Alisa. Jessica tries to talk Alisa down, but Alisa grabs Sunday and jumps out of the hospital, letting Sunday fall to her death. Costa tells Jessica to stay out of the way of the police, but Jessica secretly arranges to meet with Alisa at Trish's apartment. Meanwhile, Trish is angry at Jessica for stopping the procedure early, but she soon begins to have violent convulsions. Hogarth tracks down Green and tells her a fabricated story about Ryback secretly conning multiple women. Giving Green a gun, Hogarth watches her confront Ryback and shoot him. Hogarth then calls the police. At Trish's apartment, Jessica considers killing Alisa but is unable to do it. Alisa knocks Jessica out and kidnaps her.
26	13	"AKA Playland"	Uta Briesewitz	Story by : Jesse Harris; Teleplay by : Melissa Rosenberg	March 8, 2018
Jessica attempts to resist Alisa but eventually decides to work with her. They drive towards the Mexico–United States border, saving a family caught in a traffic accident on the way. Jessica meets with Arocho to arrange new papers so they can cross the border, but he is followed by the police. Jessica and Alisa then drive towards the Canada–United States border but are confronted with police road blocks. They then go to the nearby amusement park Playland, where Alisa decides to wait until the police arrive. Trish sees a news report on the traffic accident and talks to Costa about the road blocks. Remembering that the Jones family had visited Playland before the accident, Trish goes there and kills Alisa. Jessica takes the blame but does not forgive Trish. Trish later discovers that her reflexes appear to be heightened. Ducasse gives the blackmail material he found to Hogarth, allowing her to leave the law firm with enough money to start her own. Ducasse then begins working for Hogarth as part of Cheng's agency. Jessica embraces some aspects of normal life with Arocho.

== Cast and characters ==
=== Main ===
- Krysten Ritter as Jessica Jones
- Rachael Taylor as Patricia "Trish" Walker
- Eka Darville as Malcolm Ducasse
- J. R. Ramirez as Oscar Arocho
- Terry Chen as Pryce Cheng
- Leah Gibson as Inez Green
- Carrie-Anne Moss as Jeri Hogarth
- Janet McTeer as Alisa Jones

=== Recurring ===
- Hal Ozsan as Griffin Sinclair
- Maury Ginsberg as Steven Benowitz
- Kevin Chacon as Vido Arocho
- Rebecca De Mornay as Dorothy Walker
- John Ventimiglia as Eddy Costa
- Lisa Tharps as Ruth Sunday
- Callum Keith Rennie as Karl Malus
- Eden Marryshow as Shane Ryback

=== Notable guests ===
- Wil Traval as Will Simpson
- Elden Henson as Foggy Nelson
- Daniel Marcus as Maury Tuttlebaum
- David Tennant as Kilgrave
- Rob Morgan as Turk Barrett
- Tijuana Ricks as Thembi Wallace

== Production ==
=== Development ===
In January 2015, Netflix COO Ted Sarandos stated that Jessica Jones was "eligible to go into multiple seasons for sure" and Netflix would look at "how well [they] are addressing both the Marvel fanbase but also the broader fanbase" in terms of determining if additional seasons would be appropriate. In July 2015, Sarandos said some of Marvel's Netflix television series would "selectively have multiple seasons as they come out of the gate," with series showrunner Melissa Rosenberg saying she was hopeful Jessica Jones would get an additional season before the miniseries The Defenders (2017). Rosenberg later expanded on this, saying that Marvel Television and Netflix were working out the placement of a potential second season, though "[i]t might not be possible from a logistical standpoint" to have a second season of Jessica Jones debut before The Defenders; Sarandos later confirmed this to be the case, stating that the season would air after The Defenders released in 2017. On January 17, 2016, Netflix ordered a second season of 13 episodes. Raelle Tucker joined the season as an executive producer and writer, replacing Liz Friedman from the first season, who departed the series to work on the pilot for the ABC series Conviction (2016–2017).

=== Writing ===
Rosenberg and the season's writers were halfway through the writing process by August 2016, with the scripts completed by the end of October 2016. Writing during the 2016 United States presidential election, Rosenberg noted she "was just so angry" and that she and the writing team tried to tap "into the rage Hillary [Clinton] must have felt every day" for the characters. With The Defenders releasing before the season, Rosenberg used the miniseries as an opportunity to help "set up" elements for the season, working with The Defenders executive producers and writers Doug Petrie and Marco Ramirez to do so.

Rosenberg wanted to "continue with [the Jessica Jones] character" in the season, saying, "She's a very damaged character, her damage goes beyond [David Tennant's] Kilgrave. There's a lot to mine from in her backstory and in her present day situation." Actress Krysten Ritter said that the second season would evolve from the first and that, for Jones, "The first season was in her head and the second season is in her heart," adding that Jones "is in a pretty dark headspace" at the beginning of the season and that the season would be "more of an emotional thriller this time." On whether Tennant could return for the second season, Rosenberg said, "Sure, when you have David Tennant, you want him around forever [...] But the show is called Jessica Jones and the story is about Jessica's arc and how does that play out in its best form?" It was noted that Kilgrave would be "hard to top", though, with Marvel Television head Jeph Loeb saying, "One of the things that's important about any Marvel show is your hero is often defined by how strong your antagonist is," with Rosenberg adding that the objective for the new villain, or villains, for the season would be not to match or do what was done with Kilgrave. As Kilgrave does appear in the season, Rosenberg felt it was important to have him return to "be that mirror again" for Jones, as he is "such a part of her construction and her dilemma."

Rosenberg also hoped to "further expand on the ensemble and on Jessica's world" by giving more screen time to supporting characters, noting that in the first season, "the trick of a show that's called Jessica Jones [is if] she's not in the scene, it's not a guarantee that scene will end up in the final picture. You have to earn secondary character stories. You have to flesh them out enough so that they can eventually carry stories of their own" in future seasons. She also wanted to continue to explore the relationship between Jones and Trish Walker, stating "That is the core relationship in the piece. It is about female friendship, it is about how friends evolve—they're sisters, really—and it's about how they evolve and ping off each other." On Jones becoming famous after her heroics in the first season, Ritter said, "She keeps her circle small because she doesn't want people in her life, so there's no textbook on how to deal with new popularity or new eyes on you." Speaking on the social issues she hoped to tackle in the season, after covering "issues of choice, interracial relationships, domestic violence, [and] issues of consent" while also exploring "feminism and being a woman in this world" in the first, Rosenberg said, "I'm not quite sure yet what the social issues are that we're dealing with [in season 2]. We're just trying to find some resonance for [Jessica Jones] and a new place to push her, to give Krysten something new to play and really push the boundaries of the character."

After much of the first season was taken from the Alias comic book, Rosenberg wanted to continue that trend with the second season, but she acknowledged that "the MCU is very different from the comics in terms of its mythology. In the books there were things building towards "Civil War" and all that, and here that's not the case. The nature of that is we're probably not going to be able to continue to do parallel storylines [to Alias]". On having Jones continue to struggle with the same issues in the second season, Loeb said, "The end of the [first season]—and it was one of the things that was very important when we talked about the end of the first [season]—was that it wasn't, 'Ooh, I triumphed and now I can get in my hovercar and join the Avengers.' That wasn't the story we were interested in telling." Rosenberg elaborated by comparing the Jessica Jones to her previous series Dexter, saying that she learned "you can advance the character, but you never want to cure the character. With Dexter, the moment he felt guilt or accepted that he was 'bad,' the show's over. He's no longer a sociopath. The equivalent for us would be if Jessica somehow recovered from the damage that had been done to her. People don't just heal". She added that Jones' killing of Kilgrave at the end of the first season was "a life changing experience" and something that would affect the character going forward. Rosenberg also stated that the season would be "about digging deeper into this chaos and peeling back those layers [of Jones' life], just going to the core of her being" after the first season focused on Jones' trauma and facing her abuser.

=== Casting ===
After the season was ordered, several main cast members revealed that they would return for the second season, including Krysten Ritter as Jessica Jones, Rachael Taylor as Patricia "Trish" Walker, and Carrie-Anne Moss as Jeri Hogarth. Eka Darville also reprised his role as Malcolm Ducasse. In March 2017, J. R. Ramirez was cast as Oscar Arocho, which was revealed in July after the airing of his character's death on Power. In April 2017, Janet McTeer was cast in an undisclosed role, described as someone who has "an enormous impact on Jessica's life." She was revealed to be playing Alisa, Jessica's mother, who was briefly portrayed in flashbacks by Miriam Shor in the first season. By July, Leah Gibson had also joined the cast, in the role of Inez Green. Also joining in the season was Terry Chen as Pryce Cheng.

In August 2017, David Tennant was confirmed to be reprising his role as Kilgrave, appearing as a hallucination, with Wil Traval also returning as Will Simpson. Recurring characters in the season included Rebecca De Mornay reprising her role as Dorothy Walker, Kevin Chacon as Vido Arocho, and Callum Keith Rennie as Karl Malus. Elden Henson and Rob Morgan reprised their roles as Foggy Nelson and Turk Barrett from previous Marvel Netflix series, respectively.

=== Design ===
Robert Coleman / Whizzer wears a yellow hood that pays homage to the character's all-yellow costume in the comics. Oscar's paintings in the season were created by comic book artist David Mack, who has drawn covers for Jessica Jones comics.

=== Filming ===
Filming began the week of April 3, 2017 in New York City, once again using the working title Violet. This followed the end of production on The Defenders in March, with Ritter having indicated in May 2016 that the season would film back-to-back with The Defenders. Filming occurred at the Long Island Aquarium. Filming for the season wrapped on September 14, 2017.

Approaching the second season, Rosenberg wanted to increase the number of female directors working on the series as a further push for representation. This was a goal that "Marvel was completely on board with", and, given the demand of many talented female directors at the time, the series' producers looked to book only female directors first and approach male directors later in the pre-production phase if needed. Another member of the production suggested that the series book only female directors for the season, which Rosenberg "hadn't contemplated [as a] concept prior to that conversation". She quickly made that the goal of the production and, in October 2016, Rosenberg confirmed that all 13 episodes of the season would be directed by women.

=== Music ===
A soundtrack album for the season was released by Hollywood Records and Marvel Music digitally on March 16, 2018, featuring selections of the original score for the season composed by Sean Callery, as well as the original song "I Want Your Cray Cray".

All music composed by Sean Callery.

Jessica Jones: Season 2 (Original Soundtrack)
No.	Title	Length
1.	"Jessica Jones Main Title (Double Shot Version)"	5:11
2.	"The Experiment Room"	2:12
3.	"Malcolm Suits Up"	1:11
4.	"The Bear on the Wall"	5:13
5.	"Alisa's Theme"	2:32
6.	"Run Whizzer Run"	2:51
7.	"I Want Your Cray Cray" (performed by Rachael Taylor & Kandi Mark)	2:49
8.	"Hogarth's Unexpected News"	1:34
9.	"Malcolm and Trish"	1:21
10.	"Gunpoint"	3:16
11.	"Rooftop Movie Night"	1:20
12.	"Alisa Surrounded"	4:11
13.	"It Didn't Have to Be You"	2:51
14.	"Hogarth Getting Even"	1:54
15.	"Roadside Assistance"	3:27
16.	"The Abandoned Lab"	4:09
17.	"Cheng Window Shot"	2:00
18.	"Escaping the Fire"	4:18
19.	"The Ferris Wheel"	3:28
20.	"Starting at the Beginning"	1:17
Total length:		57:05

=== Marvel Cinematic Universe tie-ins ===
The season makes several references to the events of the Marvel Cinematic Universe (MCU) film Captain America: Civil War, including Vido Arocho's toy Captain America's shield being broken, as well as mention of the Raft prison. The season also mentions Rand Enterprises from Marvel's Netflix series Iron Fist (2017–2018).

== Marketing ==
In December 2017, a teaser trailer for the season was released, along with announcing the season release date. A trailer was released on February 7, 2018. Ahead of the season releasing, Netflix revealed the episode titles and creative teams with pulp comic covers for each episode created by women artists. The artists included, in respective order for each episode: Stephanie Hans, Jen Bartel, Elizabeth Torque, Kate Niemczyk, Colleen Doran, Erica Henderson, Audrey Mox, Joyce Chin, Jenny Frison, Amy Reeder, Emanuela Lupacchino, June Brigman, and Annie Wu. The season held its red carpet premiere on March 7, 2018, at the AMC Loews Lincoln Square.

== Release ==
The second season of Jessica Jones was released on March 8, 2018, to coincide with International Women's Day, on the streaming service Netflix worldwide, in Ultra HD 4K and high-dynamic-range video. The season, along with the additional Jessica Jones seasons and the other Marvel's Netflix television series, was removed from Netflix on March 1, 2022, due to Netflix's license for the series ending and Disney regaining the rights. The season became available on Disney+ in the United States, Canada, United Kingdom, Ireland, Australia, and New Zealand on March 16, ahead of its debut in Disney+'s other markets by the end of 2022.

== Reception ==
=== Critical response ===
On review aggregator Rotten Tomatoes, the season has an approval rating of 82% with an average rating of 7.00/10, based on 89 reviews. The website's critical consensus reads, "While Jessica Jones is a slower burn with less focus than its inaugural season, its enticing new character arc more fully details the most charismatic Defender." Metacritic, which uses a weighted average, assigned the season a score of 70 out of 100 based on 19 critics, indicating "generally favorable" reviews.

In her review of the first five episodes of the season, Allison Keene of Collider gave the season 4 out of 5 stars. She felt "[t]he season really starts to kick into gear.. once we're introduced to the central mystery: the truth behind IGH," with the season getting "better and better as it goes along." However, as with previous Marvel Netflix series, the season suffered from pacing issues, featuring "a minimal or non-existent score, scenes that go on for too long, and a limited number of edits that add up to everything feeling like it's happening in real time. It's not as bad as any other Marvel series on Netflix in this regard — not even close — but it's still a problem, and one that has unbelievably still not been addressed in terms of episode count (or shorter runtimes within episodes)." Keene also felt the season missed a "driving force" by not having David Tennant back as Kilgrave, but she was glad the season largely ignored the events of The Defenders to focus on Jones and her relationships. Awarding the season a "B", Liz Shannon Miller from IndieWire said the season's all-female directors kept "the show's noir bent in place though doesn't push too hard into the realm of art — but the clean approach works, as does Ritter's always grounded and believable performance." She also enjoyed the Hogarth medical storyline, saying it was "one of the most compelling new storylines", despite it not connecting to the overall larger narrative through the first five episodes. For Miller, Janet McTeer was "the most dynamic element of these early episodes. While she has potential as a foil, there's not enough of her to keep us hooked, not to mention the lack of the emotional hook that we had with Kilgrave in season 1." Miller also felt the plot lacked direction, and agreed with Keene about the pacing issues.

Digital Spy's Jo Berry said in her review, "While the beginning of the new season lacks the focus of the first, and is missing a truly menacing bad guy for Jessica to go up against, the new additions and expanded storylines don't detract from Ritter's powerhouse performance [...] Pacing quibbles aside, this is a darkly enjoyable return for Jessica Jones, thanks to the strong scripts, slick direction and Ritter's gripping performance." In a more mixed review, The Washington Post's David Betancourt noted the season "lacks shock value". While Ritter "still brings her A-game [...] It's the lack of Kilgrave that at first seems to be what's missing from season 2." He did praise the supporting cast, feeling Darville "has a standout performance" as Malcolm, with his connection to the larger storyline "surprising and enjoyable to watch", and also praising Taylor, adding it "wouldn't hurt to bring [Taylor] in" as her comics alter ego Hellcat, to help the season that "lags at the beginning".

Conversely, Susana Polo from Polygon was left disappointed and bored by the early episodes, also noting the lack of compelling antagonist for the season. She said, "I don't see Jessica Jones' second season winning over anyone who was lukewarm about her first — or anyone who skipped it entirely. I'm a big fan, and even I left these first five episodes wondering exactly what had happened to the series that gripped me and never let go in 2015."

=== Accolades ===
Year	Award	Category	Nominee(s)	Result	Ref.
2018	Primetime Creative Arts Emmy Awards	Outstanding Music Composition for a Series (Original Dramatic Score)	Sean Callery	Nominated	
