= Jessica Jones (Marvel Cinematic Universe) =

Character in the Marvel Cinematic Universe

- Marvel Cinematic Universe character
- Krysten Ritter as Jessica Jones on the second season of Daredevil: Born Again
- First appearance: "AKA Ladies Night"; Jessica Jones; November 20, 2015
- Based on: Jessica Jones by: Brian Michael Bendis; Michael Gaydos; (in-turn based on Jessica Drew by Archie Goodwin and Marie Severin, and the unnamed character by writer Stan Lee and artist Steve Ditko)
- Adapted by: Melissa Rosenberg
- Portrayed by: Krysten Ritter; Elizabeth Cappuccino (young)

In-universe information
- Full name: Jessica Campbell Jones
- Aliases: Jewel; Knightress
- Occupation: Private investigator; Vigilante
- Affiliation: Alias Investigations; Defenders
- Family: Alisa Jones (mother); Brian Jones (father); Phillip B. Jones (brother); Dorothy Walker (adoptive mother); Trish Walker (adoptive sister)
- Spouse: Luke Cage
- Significant others: Oscar Arrocho; Erik Gelden
- Children: Danielle Cage-Jones (daughter)
- Origin: New York City, United States
- Nationality: American

Jessica Campbell Jones is a fictional character primarily portrayed by Krysten Ritter in the Marvel Cinematic Universe (MCU) media franchise, based on the Marvel Comics character of the same name created by Brian Michael Bendis and Michael Gaydos. Jones first appeared in the television series Jessica Jones (2015–2019) and has since appeared in The Defenders (2017) and Daredevil: Born Again (2026–present), as part of the franchise's street-level narratives.

Within the MCU, Jones is depicted as a super-powered private investigator and reluctant vigilante operating in New York City. Her storylines center on trauma, abuse, moral ambiguity, and reluctant heroism, distinguishing the character from traditional superhero portrayals within the MCU. Jones was in a car accident, after which she was subjected to experiments by Karl Malus, granting her superhuman abilities. Her activities led her to confront enemies such as Kilgrave, and The Hand organization, which she fought alongside the Defenders, made up of Matt Murdock / Daredevil, Luke Cage and Danny Rand / Iron Fist. She also faced her own mother Alisa Jones, serial killer Gregory Sallinger, and even her adoptive sister Trish Walker. Eventually, Jones had a daughter, Danielle, with Cage, and because of that her powers sometimes appeared and disappeared. Upon hearing that Wilson Fisk had become Mayor of New York City and founded the Anti-Vigilante Task Force (AVTF), Jones joined Murdock to confront them and save the city.

Ritter's portrayal has received widespread critical acclaim, particularly for its psychological depth and noir-influenced tone. The character has been regarded as one of Marvel Television's most acclaimed protagonists and as a significant female-led superhero adaptation.

== Concept and creation ==
Jessica Jones was created for Marvel Comics by writer Brian Michael Bendis and artist Michael Gaydos, first appearing in Alias #1 (2001). Conceived as a flawed, adult-oriented superhero operating within Marvel's street-level world, the character was noted for departing from conventional comic-book protagonists through noir influences, psychological realism, and themes of trauma.

Following Marvel Television's partnership with Netflix, a television adaptation centered on Jessica Jones was announced in 2013 as part of a shared universe of interconnected series. Showrunner Melissa Rosenberg drew heavily from Alias, while reworking elements of the comics to emphasize crime drama, emotional realism, and long-form character development.

=== Casting ===
Krysten Ritter was cast as Jessica Jones in December 2014 following a search for an actress capable of balancing the character's toughness, vulnerability, and dark humor. Rosenberg and Marvel executives cited Ritter's dramatic range and sardonic sensibility as key factors in the casting.

For the role, Ritter underwent physical training and worked closely with the creative team to shape Jessica's grounded and unconventional superhero portrayal. Her performance was frequently noted for capturing the character's cynicism while emphasizing emotional complexity.

=== Cancellation and revival ===
Following the third season of Jessica Jones in 2019, the series was canceled amid the broader end of Marvel's Netflix productions, which also affected Daredevil, Luke Cage, Iron Fist, and The Punisher.

Despite the cancellations, Ritter and Marvel Studios figures periodically expressed interest in revisiting the character. Speculation regarding Jessica Jones's return increased following the reintroduction of other Netflix-era characters into Marvel Studios productions.

Jessica was officially brought back in Daredevil: Born Again, with her return framed as part of Marvel Studios' integration of street-level characters into the broader MCU. Commentators viewed the revival as both a continuation of the Netflix characterization and a formal reaffirmation of the character's place in the franchise.

== Design ==
Jessica's visual presentation was intentionally grounded, favoring practical streetwear, leather jackets, boots, and muted palettes rather than a traditional superhero costume. The design reflected the series' noir influences and the character's resistance to conventional superhero identity.

Showrunner Melissa Rosenberg and the production team sought to avoid overt comic-book stylization, instead presenting Jessica through an urban, utilitarian aesthetic consistent with the tone of the series. Her physicality and powers were likewise portrayed in restrained fashion, often integrated into everyday movement rather than spectacle-driven action.

Costume designer Elisabeth Vastola emphasized clothing that reflected Jessica's emotional armor as much as her visual identity, with her leather jacket becoming one of the character's signature elements.

Although the adaptation largely avoided a traditional superhero costume, the series included a nod to Jessica's comic-book identity as Jewel. In the episode "AKA You're a Winner!", Trish Walker presents Jessica with a stylized costume resembling Jewel's comics outfit, including the character's white-and-blue color scheme. Jessica rejects the costume, mocking its impracticality, a moment frequently cited as emblematic of the adaptation's grounded approach to superhero conventions. Commentators have viewed the scene as both an homage to the source material and a meta-commentary on the series' departure from conventional comic-book aesthetics.

Jessica's design has been contrasted with more traditional MCU heroes, with critics noting that the understated visual approach reinforced the character's noir sensibility and antihero characterization.

== Characterization ==
Jessica is characterized by cynicism, emotional guardedness, dark humor, and reluctant heroism, traits shaped by trauma but often tempered by empathy and moral conviction. Critics have frequently described her as an antihero whose defining tension lies between self-isolation and an underlying sense of responsibility toward others. Writers and commentators have discussed the character through feminist noir traditions, trauma narratives, and unconventional superhero archetypes, often noting her departure from idealized or aspirational comic-book protagonists.

In the first season of Jessica Jones, the character is portrayed as deeply defensive and emotionally withdrawn, with much of her characterization shaped by the psychological aftermath of Kilgrave's abuse. Critics noted the season's emphasis on trauma, survival, and agency as central to Jones's identity.

The second season expanded the character's internal conflicts, emphasizing anger, grief, and questions surrounding family and identity through Jessica's relationship with her mother, Alisa Jones. Commentators observed a more emotionally vulnerable and morally conflicted portrayal compared with the first season.

In the third season, Jessica is depicted as more mature and self-aware, though still resistant to conventional heroism. Her conflict with Trish Walker is often viewed as a major turning point in her characterization, forcing Jones to confront her own ethical boundaries and reluctant acceptance of heroic responsibility.

Across the three seasons, critics frequently described Jessica's arc as a gradual movement from trauma-driven isolation toward a more complicated, if uneasy, embrace of heroism.

Her relationships with Trish Walker, Luke Cage, and Matt Murdock have also been cited as central to her characterization, often functioning as counterpoints to her cynicism and distrust.

=== In Daredevil: Born Again ===
Jessica's portrayal in Daredevil: Born Again has been discussed as reflecting a more seasoned and assured version of the character while retaining the sardonic tone and moral ambiguity associated with her earlier appearances.

Commentators have noted that while the revival preserves the character's noir sensibility and skeptical worldview, her interactions with Matt Murdock suggest a somewhat more collaborative and less isolated Jessica than in earlier portrayals.

Some critics interpreted the return as emphasizing continuity rather than reinvention, framing the character's evolution as cumulative rather than radically altered.

== Appearances ==
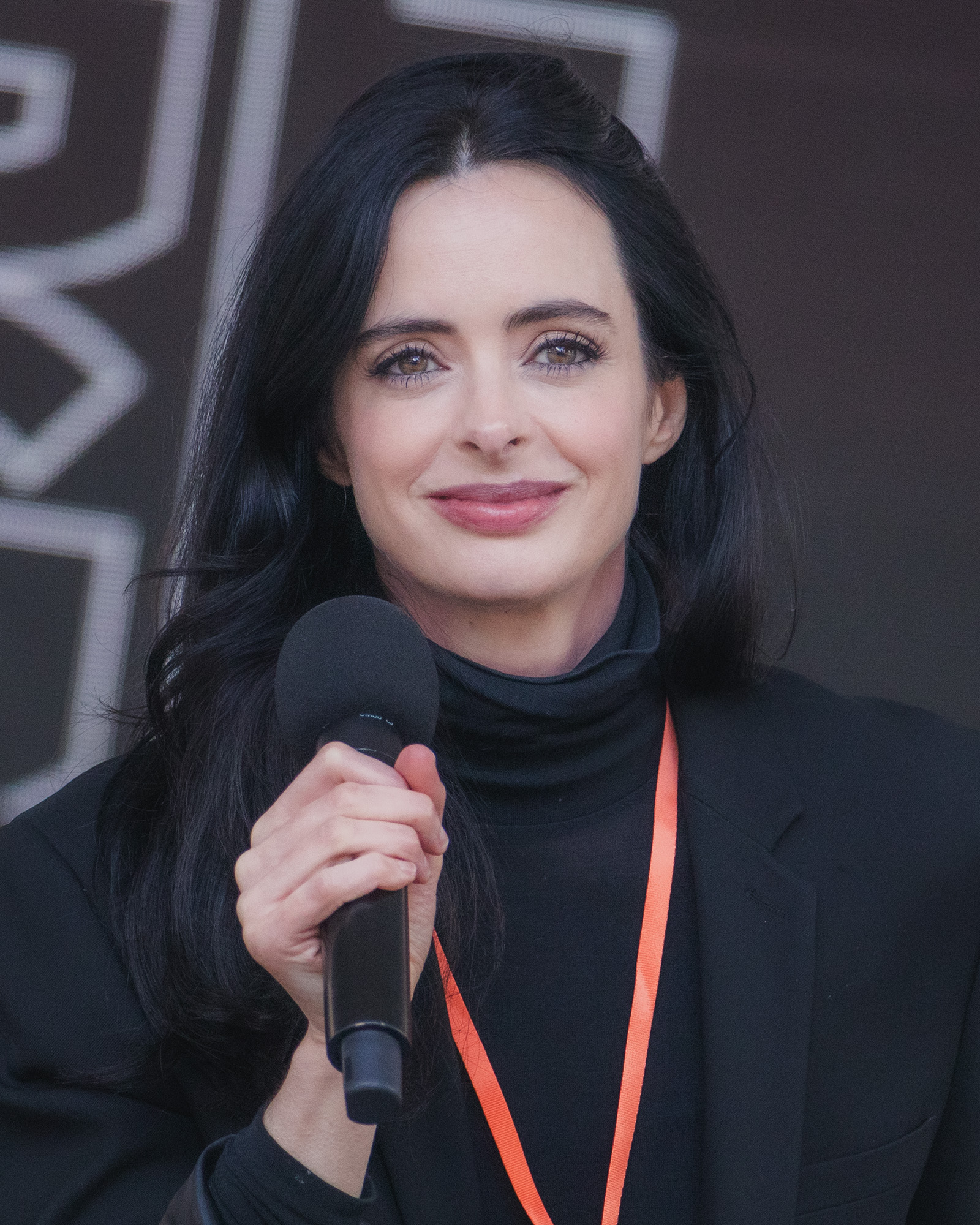
Krysten Ritter in 2025

Jessica Jones was introduced in Jessica Jones (2015), one of the interconnected Marvel Television series produced for Netflix as part of the franchise's street-level continuity.

She serves as the central protagonist of all three seasons of Jessica Jones, appearing across the series' entire run from 2015 to 2019. The first season centers on her conflict with Kilgrave, while later seasons expand the character through conflicts involving Alisa Jones and Trish Walker.

In 2017, Jones appeared in the crossover miniseries The Defenders, where she was positioned alongside Matt Murdock, Luke Cage, and Danny Rand as one of the four principal leads. Her appearance in the series marked her first major crossover within the shared Marvel Netflix continuity.

Following the cancellation of Marvel's Netflix series, Jessica remained absent from live-action appearances for several years, though the character continued to be discussed in relation to the broader MCU following the return of other Netflix-era characters.

Jones returned in Daredevil: Born Again, marking her first appearance under Marvel Studios. Her reintroduction has been described as part of the broader incorporation of the Marvel Netflix characters into the mainline MCU continuity.

=== Timeline appearances ===
The character appears in the following MCU productions:

- Jessica Jones season 1 (2015)
- The Defenders (2017)
- Jessica Jones season 2 (2018)
- Jessica Jones season 3 (2019)
- Daredevil: Born Again (2026–present)

=== Connections to the wider MCU ===
Through crossover appearances and shared continuity, Jessica has been associated with the MCU's street-level narratives, particularly through connections to Daredevil, Luke Cage, and broader New York-based vigilante storylines.

Commentators have often grouped Jessica among the central "Defenders Saga" characters later incorporated into Marvel Studios continuity.

== Fictional character biography ==
=== Early life and origins ===
Jessica Campbell grows up in New York until a car accident kills her parents and younger brother, leaving her critically injured. She survives after being subjected to experimental medical procedures conducted by IGH, which grant her superhuman strength, enhanced durability, and limited flight-like abilities. Following the accident, Jessica is adopted by Dorothy Walker and raised alongside Trish Walker, though the household proves emotionally unstable due in part to Dorothy's controlling behavior. Her complicated bond with Trish becomes one of the defining relationships of her life.

As a young adult, Jessica briefly attempts superhero activity under the alias Jewel, but her trajectory is radically altered after falling under the control of Kilgrave, whose mind-control powers allow him to manipulate and abuse her for an extended period. During the time she is under Kilgrave's influence, Jessica is compelled to commit acts against her will, an experience that leaves lasting psychological trauma and becomes foundational to her distrust, emotional guardedness, and resistance to heroic identity. After escaping Kilgrave's control, Jessica withdraws from costumed heroism and spends years coping with guilt, isolation, and alcoholism while attempting to rebuild her life.

Much of Jessica's early history is revisited in the second season, which reveals more about the IGH experiments and their connection to her mother, Alisa Jones reshaping Jessica's understanding of her origins. Seeking a more anonymous and controlled life, Jessica later establishes Alias Investigations in Hell's Kitchen, channeling her abilities into private investigative work while avoiding traditional superhero roles.

=== Conflict with Kilgrave ===
In the first season, Jessica is drawn back into conflict with Kilgrave, who had previously used mind control to manipulate and abuse her.

While continuing to operate Alias Investigations, she becomes involved in efforts to protect Hope Shlottman, one of Kilgrave's victims, whose situation reinforces Jessica's determination to stop him and serves as a major catalyst in her struggle to reclaim agency after trauma.

Jessica's investigative work frequently intersects with attorney Jeri Hogarth, for whom she performs sensitive assignments, while her relationships with Luke Cage, Malcolm Ducasse, and Trish Walker become increasingly central to both her personal life and efforts against Kilgrave.

Her relationship with Luke Cage offers one of Jessica's rare emotional openings, though it is complicated when Kilgrave's influence reaches Cage as well. Malcolm's recovery from Kilgrave's manipulation gradually turns him into one of Jessica's closest allies.

Her bond with Trish Walker is likewise central throughout the conflict, with Trish often acting as Jessica's emotional anchor while becoming directly endangered by Kilgrave.

As Kilgrave resurfaces, Jessica attempts to expose and stop him while grappling with guilt, vengeance, and moral responsibility. Their conflict escalates through multiple confrontations before culminating in Jones killing Kilgrave. The conflict is widely treated as a defining stage in Jessica's biography and in her reluctant movement toward heroism.

=== Alliance with the Defenders ===
Jessica becomes involved in the conflict against The Hand after investigating events tied to Midland Circle. Initially resistant to joining forces with others, she gradually allies with Matt Murdock, Luke Cage, and Danny Rand forming the Defenders.

Throughout the conflict, Jessica is often portrayed as the most skeptical and pragmatic member of the group, frequently clashing with Danny Rand while developing a notable rapport with Matt Murdock. She plays a major role in uncovering the Hand's plans and in the final confrontation that results in the collapse of Midland Circle.

Her participation in the alliance further establishes Jessica as part of New York's wider vigilante community despite her continuing reluctance toward superhero identity.

=== Conflict with Alisa Jones ===
The second season centers on Jessica investigating IGH and uncovering the truth behind the experiments that granted her abilities. The investigation leads to the revelation that her mother, Alisa Jones, survived the car crash and possesses unstable superhuman abilities as a result of the same experimentation, at the hands of scientist Karl Malus, who managed to save their lives.

Jessica struggles to reconcile her desire to protect Alisa with the violent consequences of her mother's actions, creating one of the character's deepest moral conflicts. The season also significantly develops Jessica's relationship with Trish Walker, whose ambitions regarding power and heroism begin creating tension between them.

As Jessica confronts trauma tied to her past, the season depicts recurring manifestations of Kilgrave in her mind, often interpreted as psychological projections of lingering guilt and internal conflict rather than a literal return. The season also explores Jessica's attempts at emotional vulnerability through her relationship with Oscar Arocho, which offers a contrast to her habitual isolation and guardedness.

The storyline ultimately ends in tragedy with Alisa's death, intensifying Jessica's emotional isolation while advancing her gradual evolution toward reluctant responsibility.

=== Conflict with Gregory Sallinger and Trish Walker ===
In the third season, Jessica investigates serial killer Gregory Salinger while her relationship with Trish deteriorates following Trish's acquisition of enhanced abilities.

As Trish embraces increasingly violent vigilantism, the season frames the two as ideological foils, contrasting Jessica's moral hesitation with Trish's absolutism. Jessica's partnership and romantic relationship with Erik Gelden introduces another moral counterpoint, as his abilities and ethically ambiguous methods often challenge Jessica's own views of justice.

Jessica's pursuit of Salinger forces her to confront corruption, vigilantism, and the limits of lawful accountability, while her conflict with Trish becomes increasingly personal and tragic. The season culminates in Jessica choosing to stop Trish and turn her over to authorities, a decision often portrayed as her clearest acceptance of moral responsibility despite her continued resistance to conventional heroism.

Following Trish's arrest, Jessica briefly considers leaving New York and abandoning her role as a hero altogether. At the moment of departure, she experiences what is implied to be a final internal manifestation of Kilgrave's voice urging her toward cynicism and retreat. Jessica rejects this impulse and chooses to remain, a moment often interpreted as symbolic confirmation of her reluctant embrace of heroism.

=== Conflict with Wilson Fisk ===
Jessica later returns during the events of Daredevil: Born Again, portrayed as a more seasoned but still skeptical version of the character.

By this point, she has a daughter, Danielle, with Luke Cage, expanding the character's emotional stakes while reinforcing themes of protectiveness and responsibility.

Living somewhat removed from vigilantism, Jessica is drawn back into conflict as Wilson Fisk's Anti-Vigilante campaign intensifies. She ultimately joins Matt Murdock's resistance movement, assisting underground efforts opposing Fisk's control over New York. During this period, Jessica is approached about working for Mr. Charles and briefly considers the opportunity before rejecting alignment with him, reinforcing her longstanding distrust of institutional power.

Her renewed partnership with Matt Murdock is portrayed as one of mutual respect shaped by their shared history, with Jessica acting as both investigative ally and active participant in the resistance against Fisk.

Her appearances in Born Again have often been interpreted as extending her arc from reluctant survivor to reluctant—but increasingly committed—hero.

== Reception ==
=== Critical response ===
Krysten Ritter's portrayal of Jessica Jones has received widespread critical acclaim, with reviewers frequently praising the performance's emotional complexity, sardonic humor, and balance of vulnerability and toughness. Critics often singled out Ritter's portrayal as central to the success of Jessica Jones, particularly in the first season, which was widely regarded as one of Marvel Television's strongest productions. Reviewers also praised the character for departing from more conventional superhero archetypes, with Jessica frequently described as a compelling antihero shaped as much by trauma and moral ambiguity as by superhuman abilities. The character's interactions with Kilgrave, Trish Walker, Luke Cage, and Matt Murdock have likewise been cited as among the strongest elements of her portrayal. Jessica's return in Daredevil: Born Again was also positively received, with commentary often praising the revival for preserving the character's voice while allowing for visible evolution.

=== Character analysis ===
Scholars and critics have frequently discussed Jessica Jones through themes of trauma, abuse, recovery, addiction, and feminist reinterpretations of superhero narratives. The character has often been cited as a rare superhero protagonist whose arc foregrounds psychological survival as much as heroic action. Particular attention has been given to the first season's treatment of coercive control through Kilgrave, which some critics described as a notable use of genre storytelling to explore abuse and agency. Jessica's characterization has also been analyzed within noir traditions, with writers comparing her to hardboiled detective archetypes adapted through a superhero framework. Her reluctant heroism and moral skepticism have frequently been contrasted with more traditional heroic figures in the Marvel franchise.

=== Cultural impact ===
Jessica Jones has often been regarded as one of the most significant female-led superhero television characters. The character has been credited with helping expand perceptions of what superhero adaptations could explore, particularly through darker psychological themes and adult-oriented storytelling. Commentators have frequently cited Jessica as one of Marvel's most influential street-level characters and among the defining protagonists of the Marvel Netflix era. Ritter's portrayal has also been recognized as helping establish the character as a prominent figure in discussions of women in superhero media.

=== Accolades ===
Year	Works	Award	Category	Result	Ref.
2015	Jessica Jones	TVLine's Performer of the Week	Performance in "AKA You're a Winner!"	Won	
2016	Jessica Jones	Critics' Choice Awards	Best Actress in a Drama Series	Nominated	
2016	Jessica Jones	Dorian Awards	TV Performance of the Year – Actress	Nominated	
2016	Jessica Jones	Webby Awards	Special Achievement: Best Actress	Won	
2016	Jessica Jones	Glamour Awards	International TV Actress	Won	
2016	Jessica Jones	Saturn Awards	Best Actress on Television	Nominated	
2018	The Defenders	Saturn Awards	Best Supporting Actress on Television	Nominated	
2019	Jessica Jones	Saturn Awards	Best Actress in a Streaming Presentation	Nominated	

== See also ==
- Characters of the Marvel Cinematic Universe
  - List of Jessica Jones characters
  - List of The Defenders characters
