= How to Make Love to a Woman =

2010 American comedy film by Scott Culver

- DVD cover
- Directed by: Scott Culver
- Written by: Dennis Kao
- Produced by: Adam Lawson; Sheri Bryant
- Starring: Josh Meyers; Krysten Ritter; Eugene Byrd; Jenna Jameson; Ken Jeong; James Kyson Lee; Kirk Fox; Lindsay Richards; James Hong; Ian Somerhalder
- Cinematography: Dallas Sterling
- Music by: Nathan Wang
- Production companies: How to Productions; I Lied About Everything Pictures
- Distributed by: E1 Entertainment
- Release date: July 13, 2010 (United States)
- Running time: 91 minutes
- Country: United States
- Language: English

How to Make Love to a Woman is a 2010 American sex comedy film directed by Scott Culver and written by Dennis Kao, both making their respective debuts, starring Josh Meyers, Krysten Ritter, Eugene Byrd, James Hong, and Ian Somerhalder. It was released in the United States on DVD on July 13, 2010, by E1 Entertainment.

== Premise ==
The film follows Andy (Meyers) and his miscommunications regarding sex.

== Cast ==
- Josh Meyers as Andy
- Krysten Ritter as Lauren
- Eugene Byrd as Layne
- Ian Somerhalder as Daniel
- Jenna Jameson as herself
- Ken Jeong as Curtis Lee
- James Kyson Lee as Aaron
- Raviv Ullman as Scott Conners
- James Hong as Sifu
- Catherine Reitman as Vani
- Peter Jason as Mr. Conners
- Ryan Key as himself
- Chris Violette as Gas Station Attendant
