= Jessica Jones (TV series) =

2015–2019 Marvel Television series

- Genre: Detective; Neo-noir; Psychological thriller; Superhero
- Created by: Melissa Rosenberg
- Based on: Jessica Jones by: Brian Michael Bendis; Michael Gaydos
- Showrunners: Melissa Rosenberg; Scott Reynolds; (season 3)
- Starring: Krysten Ritter; Mike Colter; Rachael Taylor; Wil Traval; Erin Moriarty; Eka Darville; Carrie-Anne Moss; David Tennant; J. R. Ramirez; Terry Chen; Leah Gibson; Janet McTeer; Benjamin Walker; Sarita Choudhury; Jeremy Bobb; Tiffany Mack
- Composer: Sean Callery
- Country of origin: United States
- Original language: English
- No. of seasons: 3
- No. of episodes: 39

Production
- Executive producers: S. J. Clarkson; Liz Friedman; Allie Goss; Kris Henigman; Cindy Holland; Alan Fine; Stan Lee; Joe Quesada; Dan Buckley; Jim Chory; Jeph Loeb; Melissa Rosenberg; Karim Zreik; Brian Michael Bendis; Raelle Tucker; Scott Reynolds; Hilly Hicks Jr.
- Producer: Tim Iacofano
- Production location: New York City
- Cinematography: Manuel Billeter; Petr Hlinomaz
- Editors: Jonathan Chibnall; Michael N. Knue; Tirsa Hackshaw; Jennifer Barbot; Chris A. Peterson; Shoshanah Tanzer; Trey Ordoñez
- Running time: 44–56 minutes
- Production companies: Marvel Television; ABC Studios; Tall Girls Productions

Original release
- Network: Netflix
- Release: November 20, 2015 – June 14, 2019

Related
- Marvel's Netflix television series

Marvel's Jessica Jones is an American television series created by Melissa Rosenberg for the streaming service Netflix, based on the Marvel Comics character Jessica Jones. It is set in the Marvel Cinematic Universe (MCU), sharing continuity with the franchise's films, and was the second Marvel Netflix series leading to the crossover miniseries The Defenders (2017). The series was produced by Marvel Television in association with ABC Studios and Tall Girls Productions, with Rosenberg serving as showrunner. Scott Reynolds was co-showrunner for the third season.

Krysten Ritter stars as Jessica Jones, an ex-superhero turned private investigator who opens her own detective agency, Alias Investigations. Rachael Taylor, Eka Darville, and Carrie-Anne Moss also star, with Mike Colter, Wil Traval, Erin Moriarty, and David Tennant joining them for the first season, J. R. Ramirez, Terry Chen, Leah Gibson, and Janet McTeer joining the cast for the second season, and Benjamin Walker, Sarita Choudhury, Jeremy Bobb, and Tiffany Mack joining for the third season. A version of the series was developed by Rosenberg for ABC in 2010, but the network passed on it. She was reworking it for Netflix by late 2013 as A.K.A. Jessica Jones, with the title later being simplified. Ritter was cast as Jones in December 2014, and the series took specific influence from the character's creators, Brian Michael Bendis and Michael Gaydos. Filming took place in New York City, in areas that still look like old Hell's Kitchen.

The first season was released in its entirety on Netflix on November 20, 2015, followed by the second on March 8, 2018, and the third on June 14, 2019. They were met with positive reviews, and received numerous accolades including a Peabody Award, Hugo Award, and Primetime Creative Arts Emmy Award. Netflix canceled Jessica Jones on February 18, 2019. In March 2022, all of the Marvel Netflix series were removed from Netflix after Disney regained the license for them, and they began streaming on Disney+ that month. Ritter and Colter reprised their roles for Marvel Studios in 2026, starting in the second season of the Disney+ series Daredevil: Born Again.

== Plot ==
Jessica Jones is a superpowered woman who had a brief superhero career until an incident in which the villainous Kilgrave caused her to kill someone. After that incident, she becomes a private investigator. When Kilgrave resurfaces, Jessica must stop him.

In the second season, Jessica Jones discovers that her mother is still alive due to the experiments done by Karl Malus.

In the third season, Jessica Jones faces off against Gregory Sallinger, an enemy who is determined to prove that she is a fraud, as well as her adoptive sister turned murderous vigilante Trish Walker.

== Cast and characters ==
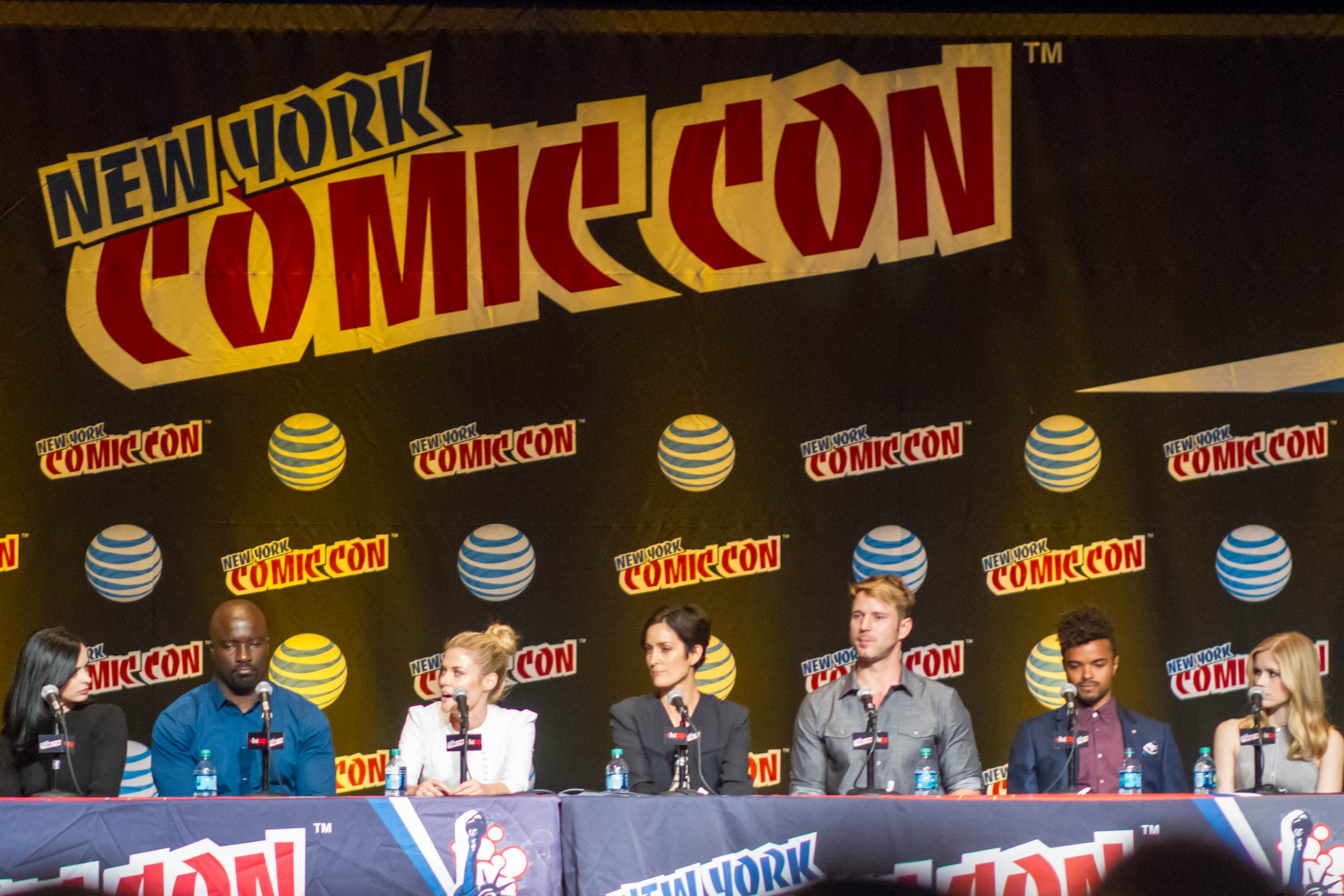
Cast of Jessica Jones at the 2015 New York Comic Con. (L to R: Ritter, Colter, Taylor, Moss, Traval, Darville, Moriarty)

- Krysten Ritter as Jessica Jones:
  A former superhero with superhuman strength and limited flight suffering from PTSD who runs her own detective agency, Alias Investigations. Showrunner Melissa Rosenberg had Ritter on the top of her list for playing Jones, even when Rosenberg was developing the series for ABC. Marvel Television head Jeph Loeb noted that the character "has real problems with a number of things that she abuses! And we're not shying away from that." Ritter described the character as "very rough around the edges, and dry and sarcastic and a total asshole sometimes. But I think at her core she's a good person." She put on 10 pounds (4.5 kg) of muscle for the role. Elizabeth Cappuccino portrayed a young Jessica.
- Mike Colter as Luke Cage:
  A man with superhuman strength and unbreakable skin, whom Jones encounters in the course of an investigation. Colter put on 30 pounds (14 kg) of muscle for the role, and described the character as "a darker, grittier, more tangible character than Iron Man or Thor. He likes to keep things close to his chest, operate on the hush-hush." Colter was pleased and surprised that the audience "got" the character, as Luke "was a man of few words and a lot of subtext," which was refreshing: "we were going for this character in a way that said little but spoke volumes [...] I felt people got the subtleties."
- Rachael Taylor as Patricia "Trish" Walker:
  A former model and child star known as "Patsy", Jones' adoptive sister and best friend who now works as a radio host. Jones' best friend was going to be Carol Danvers when Rosenberg was developing the series at ABC but was changed to Walker due to the changing nature of the MCU and the fact that Danvers would be featured in her own film. Rosenberg ultimately found this to be "much more appropriate [...] it was better that [Jessica's] best friend was not someone with powers. It actually ends up being a really great mirror for her." Loeb said, "what's most important is the relationship between [Walker] and Jessica, and how these two women who are [sisters] could be that different, and yet believe in the same kinds of things." At the end of the second season, having become resentful of Jessica's abilities and subsequently killing her mother, Trish acquires powers of enhanced reflexes and agility and becomes a vigilante in the third season, ultimately serving as the season's main antagonist. Catherine Blades portrayed a young Trish.
- Wil Traval as Will Simpson:
  An NYPD sergeant who is very serious about his job. Traval felt that Simpson sees everything in "black and white" and that "justice can be served easily," an opposite to Jessica, who "deals in a world of gray" that causes the two to have friction between them. Traval described the character as "reinvented" and "reshaped" for the series from the one in the comics, as the comic character was "a little bit too hard to handle. [H]e was just a psychotic crazy guy."
- Erin Moriarty as Hope Shlottman:
  A student-athlete attending New York University who is a client of Alias Investigations. Moriarty called her character a "polar opposite" to Jessica Jones, describing Hope as "an all-American girl, [innocent and] really earnest." Over the course of the series, the two form a bond, and Jessica becomes protective of Hope due to a shared experience they have with Kilgrave.
- Eka Darville as Malcolm Ducasse:
  Jones' neighbor who struggles with drug addiction, resulting in his personal journey intertwining with hers. Darville stated Malcolm was a new character for the series, though inspired by "seed characters" from the comics. He also felt playing the character with the drug addiction "was pretty intense and dark" and that Malcolm's relationship with Jessica "is like a flip-flop between victim and savior [...] much more [sibling-like] than anything else."
- Carrie-Anne Moss as Jeri Hogarth:
  An attorney and potentially powerful ally to Jones, who hires Jones for cases. The character's gender was changed from male to female for the series, and the character was made a lesbian. Moss signed on to the series after reading the first two scripts, having been pitched the character by Loeb and Rosenberg. Moss described the character as fierce, strong, and powerful, and "she likes that power." She worked "a few days every episode", which allowed her to grow the character throughout the series, while not knowing what the character would become as she played each moment, which she noted was how real-life is.
- David Tennant as Kilgrave:
  A man from Jones' past who can control minds. He was born Kevin Thompson and was experimented on as a young child, gaining his powers. Loeb called him "a terrible man who doesn't see himself as terrible" and compared him to Vincent D'Onofrio's Wilson Fisk in Daredevil, saying, "there are going to be times [watching Daredevil] when you're uncomfortable because you're not quite rooting for Matt, you're kind of rooting for Wilson, and it's the same kind of thing you're going to find in Jessica. There's going to be moments where some of the things that she does is pretty questionable. And some of the things that, when you learn about Kilgrave's character and the way that David Tennant plays that character, it's really extraordinary." James Freedson-Jackson portrayed a young Kilgrave.
- J. R. Ramirez as Oscar Arocho: A painter and the new superintendent in Jones' building. He is a single father to a young boy named Vido, and he and Jones engage in a relationship.
- Terry Chen as Pryce Cheng: A rival private investigator to Jones.
- Leah Gibson as Inez Green: A "street-wise" nurse.
- Janet McTeer as Alisa Jones:
  Jessica's mother, who survived the car accident that killed Jessica's father and brother. She and Jessica were both treated at a private clinic specializing in gene editing, which granted both superhuman abilities. She was declared dead and treated in secret. The extent of her injuries and years of treatment affected her mental stability. The character was first portrayed by Miriam Shor in flashbacks during the first season, before McTeer took over the role as a series regular for the second season.
- Benjamin Walker as Erik Gelden:
  A man with an enhanced empathic ability to sense the severity of evil in others. He has used his ability to blackmail various people, including Gregory Sallinger. A love interest for Jessica who is also trying to help his sister, Brianna.
- Sarita Choudhury as Kith Lyonne: A concert cellist and Jeri's former flame
- Jeremy Bobb as Gregory Sallinger:
  A ruthless, hyperintelligent serial killer who has targeted Jessica Jones to expose her as a "fraud" because he believes "supers" have cheated life with their abilities rather than earned things through hard work.
- Tiffany Mack as Zaya Okonjo: A junior associate at Hogarth & Associates who Jeri comes to rely on. She is dating Malcolm.

== Episodes ==
Season	Episodes	Originally released
1	13	November 20, 2015
2	13	March 8, 2018
3	13	June 14, 2019

=== Season 1 (2015) ===
No. overall	No. in season	Title	Directed by	Written by	Original release date
1	1	"AKA Ladies Night"	S. J. Clarkson	Melissa Rosenberg	November 20, 2015
2	2	"AKA Crush Syndrome"	S. J. Clarkson	Micah Schraft	November 20, 2015
3	3	"AKA It's Called Whiskey"	David Petrarca	Story by : Liz Friedman; Teleplay by : Liz Friedman & Scott Reynolds	November 20, 2015
4	4	"AKA 99 Friends"	David Petrarca	Hilly Hicks Jr.	November 20, 2015
5	5	"AKA The Sandwich Saved Me"	Stephen Surjik	Dana Baratta	November 20, 2015
6	6	"AKA You're a Winner!"	Stephen Surjik	Edward Ricourt	November 20, 2015
7	7	"AKA Top Shelf Perverts"	Simon Cellan Jones	Jenna Reback & Micah Schraft	November 20, 2015
8	8	"AKA WWJD?"	Simon Cellan Jones	Scott Reynolds	November 20, 2015
9	9	"AKA Sin Bin"	John Dahl	Jamie King & Dana Baratta	November 20, 2015
10	10	"AKA 1,000 Cuts"	Rosemary Rodriguez	Dana Baratta & Micah Schraft	November 20, 2015
11	11	"AKA I've Got the Blues"	Uta Briesewitz	Scott Reynolds & Liz Friedman	November 20, 2015
12	12	"AKA Take a Bloody Number"	Billy Gierhart	Hilly Hicks Jr.	November 20, 2015
13	13	"AKA Smile"	Michael Rymer	Story by : Jamie King & Scott Reynolds; Teleplay by : Scott Reynolds & Melissa Rosenberg	November 20, 2015

=== Season 2 (2018) ===
No. overall	No. in season	Title	Directed by	Written by	Original release date
14	1	"AKA Start at the Beginning"	Anna Foerster	Melissa Rosenberg	March 8, 2018
15	2	"AKA Freak Accident"	Minkie Spiro	Aïda Mashaka Croal	March 8, 2018
16	3	"AKA Sole Survivor"	Mairzee Almas	Lisa Randolph	March 8, 2018
17	4	"AKA God Help the Hobo"	Deborah Chow	Jack Kenny	March 8, 2018
18	5	"AKA The Octopus"	Millicent Shelton	Jamie King	March 8, 2018
19	6	"AKA Facetime"	Jet Wilkinson	Raelle Tucker	March 8, 2018
20	7	"AKA I Want Your Cray Cray"	Jennifer Getzinger	Hilly Hicks Jr.	March 8, 2018
21	8	"AKA Ain't We Got Fun"	Zetna Fuentes	Gabe Fonseca	March 8, 2018
22	9	"AKA Shark in the Bathtub, Monster in the Bed"	Rosemary Rodriguez	Jenny Klein	March 8, 2018
23	10	"AKA Pork Chop"	Neasa Hardiman	Aïda Mashaka Croal	March 8, 2018
24	11	"AKA Three Lives and Counting"	Jennifer Lynch	Jack Kenny & Lisa Randolph	March 8, 2018
25	12	"AKA Pray for My Patsy"	Liz Friedlander	Raelle Tucker & Hilly Hicks Jr.	March 8, 2018
26	13	"AKA Playland"	Uta Briesewitz	Story by : Jesse Harris; Teleplay by : Melissa Rosenberg	March 8, 2018

=== Season 3 (2019) ===
No. overall	No. in season	Title	Directed by	Written by	Original release date
27	1	"A.K.A. The Perfect Burger"	Michael Lehmann	Melissa Rosenberg	June 14, 2019
28	2	"A.K.A. You're Welcome"	Krysten Ritter	Hilly Hicks, Jr.	June 14, 2019
29	3	"A.K.A. I Have No Spleen"	Anton Cropper	Lisa Randolph	June 14, 2019
30	4	"A.K.A. Customer Service Is Standing By"	Liesl Tommy	Jamie King	June 14, 2019
31	5	"A.K.A. I Wish"	Mairzee Almas	J. Holtham	June 14, 2019
32	6	"A.K.A. Sorry Face"	Tim Iacofano	Jesse Harris	June 14, 2019
33	7	"A.K.A. The Double Half-Wappinger"	Larry Teng	Nancy Won	June 14, 2019
34	8	"A.K.A. Camera Friendly"	Stephen Surjik	Scott Reynolds	June 14, 2019
35	9	"A.K.A. I Did Something Today"	Jennifer Getzinger	Lisa Randolph	June 14, 2019
36	10	"A.K.A. Hero Pants"	Sanford Bookstaver	Hilly Hicks, Jr. & Jamie King	June 14, 2019
37	11	"A.K.A. Hellcat"	Jennifer Getzinger	Jane Espenson	June 14, 2019
38	12	"A.K.A. A Lotta Worms"	Sarah Boyd	Scott Reynolds	June 14, 2019
39	13	"A.K.A. Everything"	Neasa Hardiman	Story by : Melissa Rosenberg & Nancy Won; Teleplay by : Melissa Rosenberg & Lisa Randolph	June 14, 2019

== Production ==
=== Development ===
In December 2010, Melissa Rosenberg was developing AKA Jessica Jones for ABC under her new production banner Tall Girls Productions, along with ABC Studios and Marvel Television. The series, which would be based on the comic book series Alias and centered on the character Jessica Jones, was intended to air in 2011 of the 2011–12 television season, with Marvel Television head Jeph Loeb, Joe Quesada, Alan Fine, and Howard Klein serving as executive producers, and Alias writer Brian Michael Bendis acting as a consultant. At the 2011 San Diego Comic-Con, Loeb said the series was "about a failed superhero who is rebuilding her life as a private detective in New York City", and would include the characters Carol Danvers and Luke Cage. In November, Rosenberg said the show was now "hoping to get on the schedule for" 2012 of the 2012–13 television season, and added, "I love this character. That is an incredibly damaged, dark, complex female character that kicks ass [...] [she is] a former superhero with PTSD, post-traumatic stress disorder." She also stated that, while Cage was a part of the series, the couple's daughter Danielle would appear "way down the road". Rosenberg said later in the month that the series would acknowledge the existence of the Marvel Cinematic Universe, with references to Tony Stark and Stark Industries in the pilot script, but admitted that "as we go along things will alter in terms of what is made available to us, but we're definitely in that universe. We are in no way denying that that universe exists. And as much as I can I'm going to pull everything in from there that I can use". She also confirmed that Danvers would be a principal character in the series.

In May 2012, ABC president Paul Lee said the network had passed on the series. Loeb revealed that ABC had requested the series switch its focus to Danvers as the main character, who has "a great life" living on Fifth Avenue, with Jones become a side character to Danvers' story. Later that year, Rosenberg was shopping the show around to other networks, saying "I don't know if it's an ABC show. It might be a cable show, really. The [Alias] graphic novel is the first one that Marvel did that was meant to serve an adult audience. I toned it down a little bit for network, but it's very, very easy to translate that into cable. Very easy." In October 2013, Deadline Hollywood reported that Marvel was preparing four drama series and a miniseries, totaling 60 episodes, to present to video on demand services and cable providers, with Netflix, Amazon, and WGN America expressing interest. A few weeks later, Marvel and Disney announced that Marvel Television and ABC Studios would provide Netflix with live action series centered around Jessica Jones, Daredevil, Iron Fist, and Luke Cage, leading up to a miniseries based on the Defenders. Rosenberg was brought on to write and produce the new incarnation of the series, to be reconfigured from her original project, which she called a "page one do-over" from her original vision. S. J. Clarkson served as an executive producer for the first episode. Liz Friedman also serves as an executive producer on the series during the first season. In December 2014, the official title was revealed to be Marvel's A.K.A. Jessica Jones. However, in June 2015, Marvel revealed that the title for the series would be shortened to Marvel's Jessica Jones. On why the title was shortened, Loeb said, "It literally just became one of those things that happens. We had talked about whether that was the best title for it, and that's how it happened." Rosenberg added that the "AKA" would still be seen in the name of each episode.

In January 2016, Netflix ordered a second season of 13 episodes. Raelle Tucker joined the series as an executive producer and writer for the second season, replacing Friedman, who departed the series to work on the pilot for the ABC series Conviction. A third season was ordered on April 12, 2018, a month after the second season was released. That August, Rosenberg signed a deal to move from Netflix to Warner Bros. Television to develop new projects for the latter, after she had been looking to "do something different". Rosenberg remained showrunner of the series through completion of the third season, with Scott Reynolds joining her as co-showrunner.

=== Writing ===
[We are] very aware this is the first female superhero Marvel's ever introduced as a lead. But there was never the intention of, "this is an issue series, we're dealing with issues." While issues of sexual assault and women in power are all issues that I certainly feel very passionately about taking on, the show's all about exploring the inner workings of Jessica Jones and her ensemble.

— Showrunner Melissa Rosenberg on approaching "issues"

Rosenberg talked about the freedom that the series had, saying that it would go "even further in all our storytelling" than what Brian Michael Bendis did in the Alias comic: "That's the beauty of working with Netflix. It's 13 [episodes]. There's no pilot and then getting feedback, reaction and ratings. You're in this bubble. So, what's the story you want to tell? Where do you want to go with [the characters]?" Expanding on this, Rosenberg said that "we start off with [Bendis'] incredible source material and Jessica Jones isn't as well known in the universe obviously as Daredevil and everyone else, so it really allows for a lot of freedom in there. So there are restrictions in terms of the Marvel [Cinematic U]niverse of certain rules of mythology, but within that it's free pass." Rosenberg noted that the final series is very different from the version she developed for ABC because of the different mythology of the MCU.

Rosenberg invited Bendis to the series' writers room early on in the writing process, so the writers could ask Bendis any questions about the character. He walked away from the meeting saying that "they were asking the right questions, and that's a good sign." Bendis also noted that Rosenberg was approaching the character and issues of rape and abuse differently to him, on which he said, "I made the right choice for me as a writer then and they're making the right choice for them as writers now. I thought about how much is different and how much has changed, and if it's not brought up in Jessica, when will it be brought up? So I was like, 'Yeah, you should.' I thought that Melissa and the writers were the people to do that and that medium was better-suited to tell that kind of story."

=== Casting ===
In August 2014, Sarandos said the series was beginning to look "at casting Jessica." By November, Krysten Ritter, Alexandra Daddario, Teresa Palmer, Jessica De Gouw, and Marin Ireland were being tested for the role of Jessica Jones, with Ritter having been auditioning since October. Additionally, Lance Gross, Mike Colter, and Cleo Anthony were in contention for the role of Luke Cage, which was envisioned as a recurring role in the series before headlining Luke Cage. The next month, Ritter was cast as Jessica Jones. Ritter and Palmer had been the final candidates for the role, with both auditioning opposite Colter to test chemistry. Colter was confirmed as Luke Cage later in December. In January 2015, David Tennant was cast as Kilgrave, and Rachael Taylor was cast as Patricia "Trish" Walker. The latter character was added to the series as a replacement for Carol Danvers, as she was set to feature in her own film. A month later, Carrie-Anne Moss joined the cast, with her role revealed that October to be Jeri Hogarth, a female version of male comic book character Jeryn Hogarth. Also in February, Eka Darville, Erin Moriarty, and Wil Traval were cast as Malcolm Ducasse, Hope Shlottman, and Will Simpson, respectively.

Ritter, Taylor, Darville, and Moss return for the second season. They are joined by J. R. Ramirez as Oscar Arocho, Terry Chen as Pryce Cheng, Leah Gibson as Inez Green, and Janet McTeer as Alisa Jones. Traval and Tennant also appear in the second season as guest stars. Ritter, Taylor, Moss, and Darville also return for the third season.

=== Design ===
==== Costumes ====
Stephanie Maslansky returned as the costume designer for Jessica Jones from Daredevil, and was assisted on the first episode by Jenn Rogien, who crafted Jessica Jones' costume of leather jacket, faded jeans, and boots. Maslansky's fashion choices for each character were influenced by their comic incarnations, and she said, "You really have to study your history of the original characters and see how they dress, how they were originally drawn, how they evolved through the years in these comics. And what you might discover is that, as illustrated, they kind of do wear the same thing all the time." Maslansky also stated that "everyone has a very specific look, and you can vary within that look, but it's not over the top. It has to feel realistic and feel very grounded in this authentic reality we've created in Hell's Kitchen." On Jones' costume, Maslansky said she "considers her clothing to be an armor and a shield and something that helps her maintain a distance from other people and privacy. It keeps her from having to deal with the rest of humanity in a certain sort of way." At least 10 versions of Jones' jacket were made, which started as an Acne Studios leather motorcycle jacket that had any "bells and whistles and any additional superfluous design details" removed, while 20 pairs of jeans were used. Each piece was aged and distressed.

==== Title sequence ====
External videos
- The opening title sequence of Jessica Jones, showcasing David Mack's artwork and composer Sean Callery's main theme for the series.

The series' title sequence, created by Imaginary Forces, incorporates the jazz-style theme from composer Sean Callery mixed with artwork by David Mack, the cover artist for the original Alias comic, "taking [the viewer] around seedier, noir-esque corners of Hell's Kitchen, as if through Jessica's eyes."

Arisu Kashiwagi, lead designer at Imaginary Forces for the title sequence, was "inspired by all the changing activity and vignettes within those rows of windows [for New York-style buildings] — the patterns of light, color, narratives, and graphic silhouettes. It is pretty amazing how much you can see and the number of windows out there with wide open shades [...] I could understand our innate fascination with the rear window and that discomforting pleasure when catching a small sliver of a private act." She also looked to Edward Hopper's "Night Windows" and Gerhard Richter's paintings for reference. In order to differentiate the sequence from other painting-inspired ones, Kashiwagi chose to take "a more modern, abstract look while also embracing the spirit of David Mack's watercolor paintings from" Alias. On the design concept, she added, "We based the concept off of Jessica's PTSD and alcoholism, her blurry, unreliable point of view, and translated that visually using paint strokes that smear and obfuscate the scenes [...] the scenes would appear only in small sections of the frame, either blocked by a foreground element or contained inside of a silhouetted framing device." Michelle Dougherty, creative director on the project, looked to the opening sequence of Alfred Hitchcock's Rear Window to help create the "voyeuristic approach" as well as "using the city as a character" to highlight "the dark places [and] the grit" where Jones investigates.

=== Filming ===
Filming for the series took place in New York City, including areas of Brooklyn and Long Island City that still look like the old Hell's Kitchen, Douglaston, Queens, as well as sound stage work. Manuel Billeter served as director of photography for the series. Petr Hlinomaz was the director of photography for "A.K.A. I Wish".

=== Visual effects ===
Visual effects for the series were completed by the New York studio Shade VFX, who also worked on Daredevil, with Bryan Goodwin serving as visual effects supervisor.

=== Music ===
At the 2015 San Diego Comic-Con, Sean Callery revealed he was composing the music for the series. Callery did not begin composing the series' main theme until after reading two or three scripts, and did not see the opening graphics until after the second episode, at which point he had "a framework for a theme that [he] hoped would work". At this time, Callery said he started "fooling around" with ideas for the theme, and eventually settled on one that he felt had a "sneaky and fun-ness" quality, adding, Jessica Jones "has dry humor, a real edge to her. But there was something to this character that had a little whisker of playfulness in there, like a cat or something." After creating the theme, Callery began working on the rhythmic quality of it, eventually fully orchestrating his idea into what became the resulting opening theme. Regarding the electric guitar's entrance, Callery pointed out that it got "bigger there because as I looked at the graphics, the lights got a little more strobe-y. So that's when I decided the electric guitar might be a kind of neat add there so that the whole piece will arc a little more." A soundtrack album for the first season was released digitally on June 3, 2016. Jamie Forsyth also contributed to the music of the first season. A soundtrack album for the second season was released digitally on March 16, 2018. A soundtrack album for the third season was released digitally on July 19, 2019.

=== Marvel Cinematic Universe tie-ins ===
Jessica Jones is the second of the ordered Netflix series, after Daredevil, and was followed by Luke Cage and Iron Fist, which led to the miniseries, The Defenders. In November 2013, Disney CEO Bob Iger stated that, if the characters prove popular on Netflix, "It's quite possible that they could become feature films," which Sarandos echoed in July 2015. In August 2014, Vincent D'Onofrio, who played Wilson Fisk in Daredevil, stated that after the "series stuff with Netflix", Marvel has "a bigger plan to branch out". In March 2015, Loeb spoke on the ability for the series to cross over with the MCU films and the ABC television series, saying, "It all exists in the same universe. As it is now, in the same way that our films started out as self-contained and then by the time we got to The Avengers, it became more practical for Captain America to do a little crossover into Thor 2 and for Bruce Banner to appear at the end of Iron Man 3. We have to earn that. The audience needs to understand who all of these characters are and what the world is before you then start co-mingling in terms of where it's going."

On specific crossovers with Daredevil, which had completed its first season by the time Jessica Jones began casting, Loeb said "they're in the same area. In some cases they are in the same neighborhood. One of the things that is important to us is, when you enter the police station, it's the same police station. When you go to the hospital, you start to see the same people. [But] we don't want people suddenly going, 'Wait, is that Matt Murdock that's walking down the street?' Because that's going to feel odd, and in a weird way feel false." On existing in the MCU, specifically in the same world as the other Netflix series, Rosenberg said, "Jessica Jones is a very, very different show than Daredevil. We exist in a cinematic universe, [and] the mythology of the universe is connected, but they look very different, tonally they're very different... That was my one concern coming in: Am I going to have to fit into Daredevil or what's come before? And the answer is no."

== Marketing ==
Disney Consumer Products created a small line of products to cater to a more adult audience, given the show's edgier tone. Paul Gitter, senior VP of Marvel Licensing for Disney Consumer Products explained that the focus would be more on teens and adults than very young people, with products at outlets like Hot Topic. Additionally, a Marvel Knights merchandise program was created to support the series, which creates new opportunities for individual product lines and collector focused products. Licensing partners wanted to pair up with Marvel, despite this not being a film project, given its previous successes.

== Release ==
=== Streaming ===
Jessica Jones was released on the streaming service Netflix, in all territories where it is available, in Ultra HD 4K and high-dynamic-range video (HDR). The first season was enhanced to be available in HDR after its initial release by post-production vendor Deluxe. The episodes for each season were released simultaneously, as opposed to a serialized format, to encourage binge-watching, a format which has been successful for other Netflix original series. Despite being branded as a "Netflix Original", Jessica Jones was licensed to Netflix from Disney.

Jessica Jones was removed from Netflix on March 1, 2022, along with the other Marvel Netflix series, due to Netflix's license for the series ending and Disney regaining the rights. Disney opted not to have Netflix pay a large licensing fee to retain the distribution rights for the series, and instead announced that all the series would be made available on Disney+ on March 16 in the United States, Canada, United Kingdom, Ireland, Australia, and New Zealand, and in Disney+'s other markets by the end of 2022. In the United States, revised parental controls were introduced to the service to allow the more mature content of the series to be added, similarly to the controls that already exist for other regions that have the Star content hub.

=== Home media ===
Season	DVD release dates			Blu-ray release dates	
Season	Region 1	Region 2	Region 4	Region A	Region B
1	August 22, 2017	December 5, 2016	December 7, 2017	August 22, 2017	December 5, 2016
2	TBA	TBA	TBA	TBA	TBA
3	TBA	TBA	TBA	TBA	TBA

== Reception ==
=== Audience viewership ===
Prior to the series' cancellation, Netflix did not reveal subscriber viewership numbers for any of their other original series. However, Karim Zreik, senior vice president of original programming at Marvel Television, provided some viewership demographics for Jessica Jones in August 2017, noting that the series has attracted a large number of female viewers. Also in the month, Netflix released viewing patterns for the Marvel Netflix series. The data, which came from Netflix's "1,300 'taste communities' around the world, where subscribers are grouped based on what they watch", showed that viewers would not watch the series in chronological order by release, rather starting with Jessica Jones, then Daredevil, Luke Cage, and finally Iron Fist. Todd Yellin, Netflix's vice president of product innovation, noted that audiences watch the series "in order of how they're interested in them and how they learn about them." Netflix's data also showed that a viewer watching Jessica Jones would most often then move on to Daredevil, and vice versa, with Yellin figuring that Jessica Jones and Luke Cage would have paired up more, given that Cage was introduced on Jessica Jones. The data also revealed that other "comedies and shows with strong women" such as Friends, Master of None, and Orange Is the New Black led viewers to starting Jessica Jones. In October 2018, Crimson Hexagon, a consumer insights company, released data that examined the "social-media buzz" for the series to try to correlate it with potential viewership. The data showed that when the first season premiered in November 2015, the season had just under 300,000 Twitter and Instagram posts regarding it, and when the second season was released in March 2018, the posts had declined by half, to under 150,000.

=== Critical response ===
Critical response of Jessica Jones
Season	Rotten Tomatoes	Metacritic
1	94% (81 reviews)	81 (32 reviews)
2	82% (89 reviews)	70 (19 reviews)
3	73% (40 reviews)	65 (7 reviews)

For its first season, the review aggregator website Rotten Tomatoes reported a 94% approval rating with an average rating of 8.2/10, based on 81 reviews. The website's critical consensus reads, "Jessica Jones builds a multifaceted drama around its engaging antihero, delivering what might be Marvel's strongest TV franchise to date." Metacritic, which uses a weighted average, assigned a score of 81 out of 100 based on 32 critics, indicating "universal acclaim".

For season two, Rotten Tomatoes reported an 82% approval rating with an average rating of 7/10, based on 89 reviews. The website's critical consensus reads, "While Jessica Jones is a slower burn with less focus than its inaugural season, its enticing new character arc more fully details the most charismatic Defender." Metacritic assigned the season a score of 70 out of 100 based on 19 critics, indicating "generally favorable reviews".

For season three, Rotten Tomatoes reported an approval rating of 73% with an average rating of 6.4/10, based on 40 reviews. The website's critical consensus states, "Even if it's not the most satisfying finale for an entire era of Marvel television, Jessica Jones' final chapter finishes strong by giving its complicated heroine the space to change – and Krysten Ritter one last chance to work her sarcastic magic." Metacritic gave a weighted average score of 65 out of 100, based on 7 critics, indicating "generally favorable reviews".

=== Accolades ===
Year	Award	Category	Nominee(s)	Result	Ref.
2015	TVLine's Performer of the Week	Performance in "AKA You're a Winner!"	Krysten Ritter	Won	
2016	People's Choice Awards	Favorite Sci-Fi/Fantasy TV Actor	David Tennant	Nominated	
2016	Critics' Choice Awards	Best Actress in a Drama Series	Krysten Ritter	Nominated	
2016	Dorian Awards	TV Performance of the Year – Actress	Krysten Ritter	Nominated	
2016	Empire Awards	Best TV Series	Jessica Jones	Nominated	
2016	Peabody Awards	Entertainment and Children's programs	Jessica Jones	Won	
2016	Nebula Awards	Ray Bradbury Award for Outstanding Dramatic Presentation	Scott Reynolds, Melissa Rosenberg, and Jamie King for "AKA Smile")	Nominated	
2016	Webby Awards	Special Achievement: Best Actress	Krysten Ritter	Won	
2016	Glamour Awards	International TV Actress	Krysten Ritter	Won	
2016	Saturn Awards	Best New Media Television Series	Jessica Jones	Nominated	
2016	Saturn Awards	Best Actress on Television	Krysten Ritter	Nominated	
2016	Saturn Awards	Best Supporting Actor on Television	David Tennant	Nominated	
2016	TCA Awards	Outstanding New Program	Jessica Jones	Nominated	
2016	Hugo Awards	Best Dramatic Presentation, Short Form	"AKA Smile"	Won	
2016	Primetime Creative Arts Emmy Awards	Outstanding Main Title Design	Jessica Jones	Nominated	
2016	Primetime Creative Arts Emmy Awards	Outstanding Main Title Theme Music	Sean Callery	Won	
2016	Online Film & Television Association Award	Best New Theme Song in a Series	Sean Callery	Nominated	
2016	Online Film & Television Association Award	Best New Titles Sequence	Jessica Jones	Nominated	
2016	Gotham Awards	Breakthrough Series – Long Form	Jessica Jones	Nominated	
2018	Primetime Creative Arts Emmy Awards	Outstanding Music Composition for a Series (Original Dramatic Score)	Sean Callery	Nominated	
2018	People's Choice Awards	The Sci-Fi/Fantasy Show of 2018	Jessica Jones	Nominated	
2019	Saturn Awards	Best Streaming Superhero Television Series	Jessica Jones	Nominated	
2019	Saturn Awards	Best Actress in a Streaming Presentation	Krysten Ritter	Nominated	

In December 2015, IGN named Jessica Jones the best Netflix original programming series released to date. Seasons two and three were recognized with The ReFrame Stamp for hiring people of underrepresented gender identities, and of color.

== Other media ==
In November 2015, an update for the mobile fighting game Marvel: Contest of Champions was released, featuring a six-part story quest involving Jessica Jones and Daredevil, along with a level based on Hell's Kitchen. Additionally, Jessica Jones was added to the role-playing game Marvel: Future Fight.

== Cancellation and future ==
The series was canceled on February 18, 2019, ahead of the third-season premiere. Prior to its cancellation, Kevin A. Mayer, chairman of Walt Disney Direct-to-Consumer and International, noted that, while it had not yet been discussed, it was a possibility that Disney+ could revive the other cancelled Marvel Netflix series. Hulu's senior vice president of originals Craig Erwich also said that the streaming service was open to reviving the former Netflix series.

Ahead of Charlie Cox's appearance as Daredevil in Echo, which was released in January 2024, Marvel Studios' head of streaming Brad Winderbaum acknowledged that Marvel Studios had previously been "a little bit cagey" about what was part of their Sacred Timeline, noting how there had been the corporate divide between what Marvel Studios created and what Marvel Television created. He continued that as time has passed, Marvel Studios has begun to see "how well integrated the [Marvel Television] stories are" and personally felt "confident" in saying Daredevil specifically was part of the Sacred Timeline. With Echo's release, all of the Netflix series were retroactively added to the MCU Disney+ timeline, with Jessica Jones placed alongside the Phase Two content of the MCU, between the Guardians of the Galaxy films and Avengers: Age of Ultron (2015). An update to the Disney+ timeline split out the series by season, with Jessica Jones's second season placed after Doctor Strange (2016), and the third between Thor: Ragnarok (2017) and Ant-Man and the Wasp (2018).

Ritter reprised her role in the second season of the Disney+ series Daredevil: Born Again (2026); she had known about her return to the role for nearly two years before it was publicly announced. Colter also appears in the second season finale, with both he and Ritter slated to return in Born Again's third season (2027).
