= J. R. Ramirez =

Cuban-American actor (born 1980)

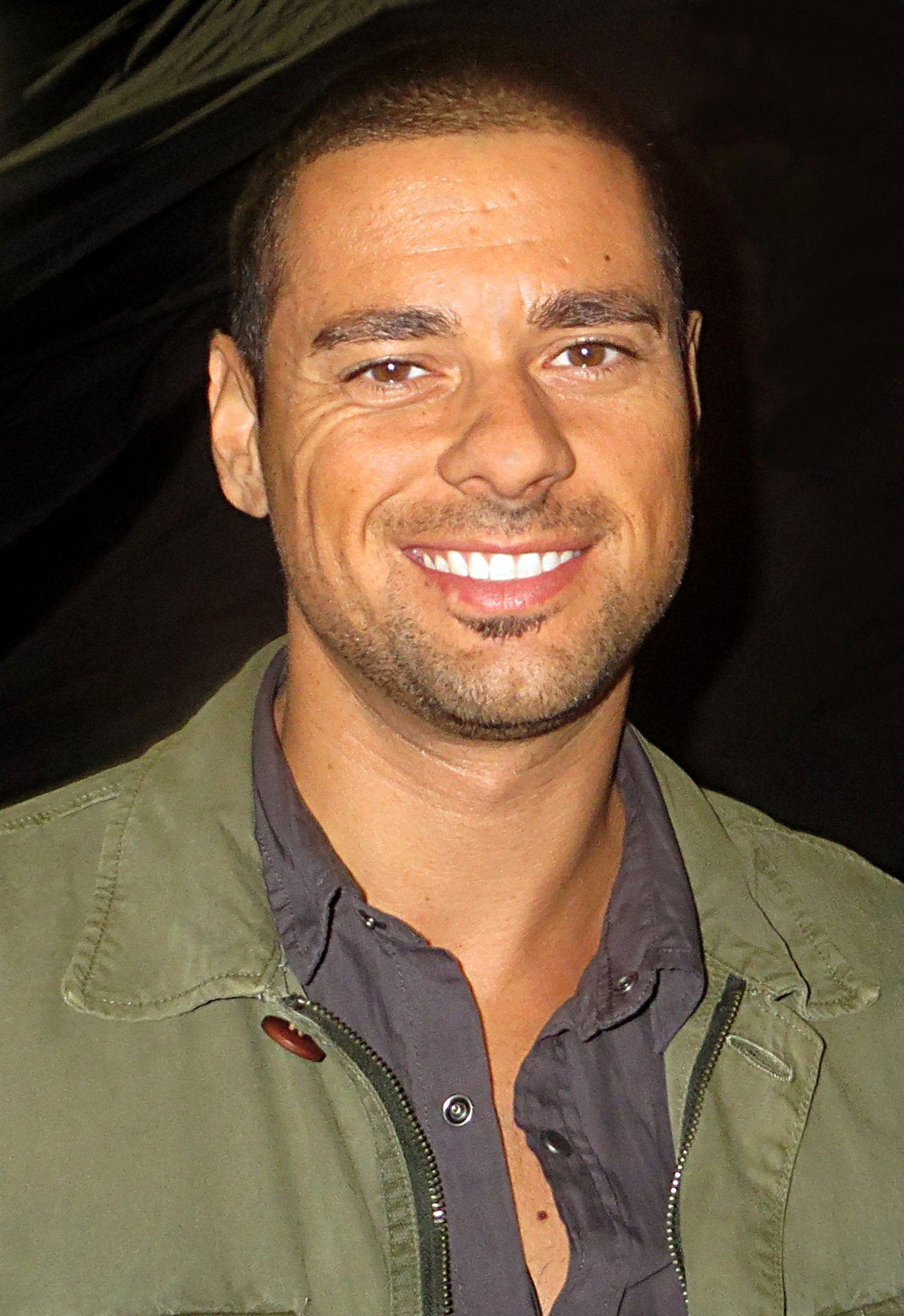
- Ramirez in 2014
- Born: October 8, 1980 (age 46); Matanzas, Cuba
- Occupation: Actor
- Years active: 2008–present

J. R. Ramirez is a Cuban-American actor. He is best known for his series regular role of Detective Jared Vasquez on the NBC/Netflix series Manifest. Prior, he was a series regular as Julio on the Starz series Power and as Oscar Arocho on the Netflix / Marvel Television series Jessica Jones. Ramirez also played Ted Grant / Wildcat in a recurring role in the third season of Arrow.

His current partner is Bonnie Leathers, she is not part of the entertainment industry.

== Early life ==
Ramirez was born in Matanzas, Cuba. When he was a baby, his family moved to the United States and he was raised in Tampa, Florida. He attended Tampa Catholic High School and graduated in 1999.

== Career ==
Ramirez played recurring character Julio on the first season of Power before being promoted to a regular cast member in the second season. He followed up by having a recurring appearance as Ted Grant / Wildcat on the third season of Arrow, before joining the second season of Jessica Jones as Oscar Arocho. In February 2018, Ramirez was cast as Detective Jared Vasquez in the NBC series Manifest.

== Filmography ==
Film
Year	Title	Role	Notes
2013	The Coalition	Lonzo Ramirez	
2017	Sun Dogs	Staff Sergeant Kendrick	
2020	Lazy Susan	Carl 'Coyote Carl'	

Television
Year	Title	Role	Notes
2008–2010	Tyler Perry's House of Payne	Diego Hernandez	10 episodes
2010	Hacienda Heights	Eddie Jr.	11 episodes
2012	GCB	'Do-Do'	Episode: "Revelation"
2013	90210	Billy	Episode: "Misery Loves Company"
2013	Emily Owens M.D.	Dr. A.J. Aquino	3 episodes
2014–2017	Power	Julio	36 episodes
2014–2015	Arrow	Ted Grant / Wildcat	4 episodes
2016	Rosewood	Frank Escajeda	Episode: "Keritan & Kissyface"
2018	NCIS: New Orleans	Jack Cooper	Episode: "Empathy"
2018–2019	Jessica Jones	Oscar Arocho	11 episodes
2018–2023	Manifest	Detective Jared Vasquez	Main cast
2025	Pulse	Patrick Sanchez	
2026	It's Not Like That	David Soto	
