= Eka Darville =

Australian actor (born 1989)

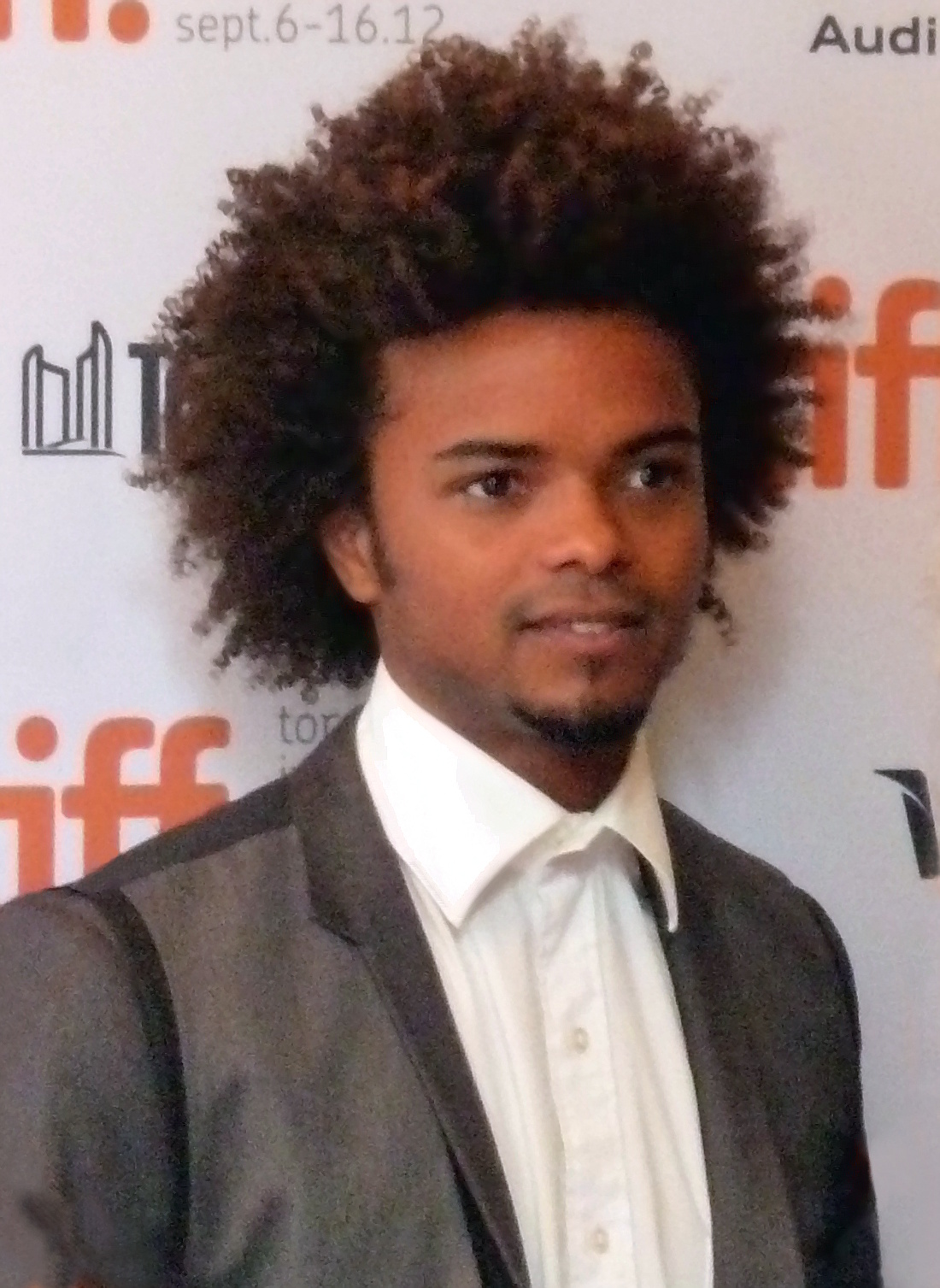
- Darville in 2012
- Born: 11 April 1989 (age 36); Cairns, Queensland, Australia
- Occupation: Actor
- Years active: 2006-present
- Partner: Lila Darville
- Children: 2

Eka Darville (born 11 April 1989) is an Australian actor. He is best known for his roles as Scott Truman in Power Rangers RPM, Pip in Mr. Pip, Malcolm Ducasse in Jessica Jones and Diego in The Originals.

== Biography ==
=== Early life ===
Darville went to Byron Bay High School and lives in Byron Bay, New South Wales, and Sydney. His father is the Jamaican reggae artist Ray Darwin and his mother is Canadian.

=== Career ===
Darville is known for playing Malcolm Ducasse on the Netflix television series Jessica Jones, as well as Diego on The CW TV series The Originals and Ryan Morgan on the Fox TV series Empire. He is also known for his past roles as Adam Bridge on the Australian television drama series Blue Water High, Taylor in The Elephant Princess, Scott Truman (Red Ranger) in Power Rangers RPM and Pietros in Spartacus: Blood and Sand.

== Filmography ==
=== Film ===
Year	Title	Role	Notes
2012	The Sapphires	Hendo	
2012	Mr. Pip	Pip	
2017	Bernard and Huey	Conrad	
2018	Her Smell	Ya-ema	
2024	Kingdom of the Planet of the Apes	Sylva	Motion-capture role

=== Television ===
Year	Title	Role	Notes
2006	Answered by Fire	Sophie's Boyfriend	TV film
2008	East of Everything	Skateboarder	"Viola Baby"
2008	Blue Water High	Adam Bridge	Main role (season 3)
2009	Power Rangers RPM	Scott Truman/Ranger Operator Series Red	Main role
2010	Spartacus: Blood and Sand	Pietros	Recurring role
2011	The Elephant Princess	Taylor	Main role (season 2)
2011	Terra Nova	Max	"Genesis: Parts 1 & 2", "What Remains"
2011	Power Rangers Samurai	Scott Truman/Ranger Operator Series Red	"Clash of the Red Rangers: Parts 1 & 2" (Voice Only) (Credited as Tobias Reiss)
2012	Shelter	Bobby Repeta	TV film
2013	The Vampire Diaries	Diego	"The Originals"
2013–14	The Originals	Diego	Recurring role
2015	Empire	Ryan Morgan	Recurring role
2015–19	Jessica Jones	Malcolm Ducasse	Main role; 35 episodes
2017	The Defenders	Malcolm Ducasse	Main role; 4 episodes
2019–20	Tell Me A Story	Beau Morris	Main role (Season 2)
