= Krysten Ritter =

American actress (born 1981)

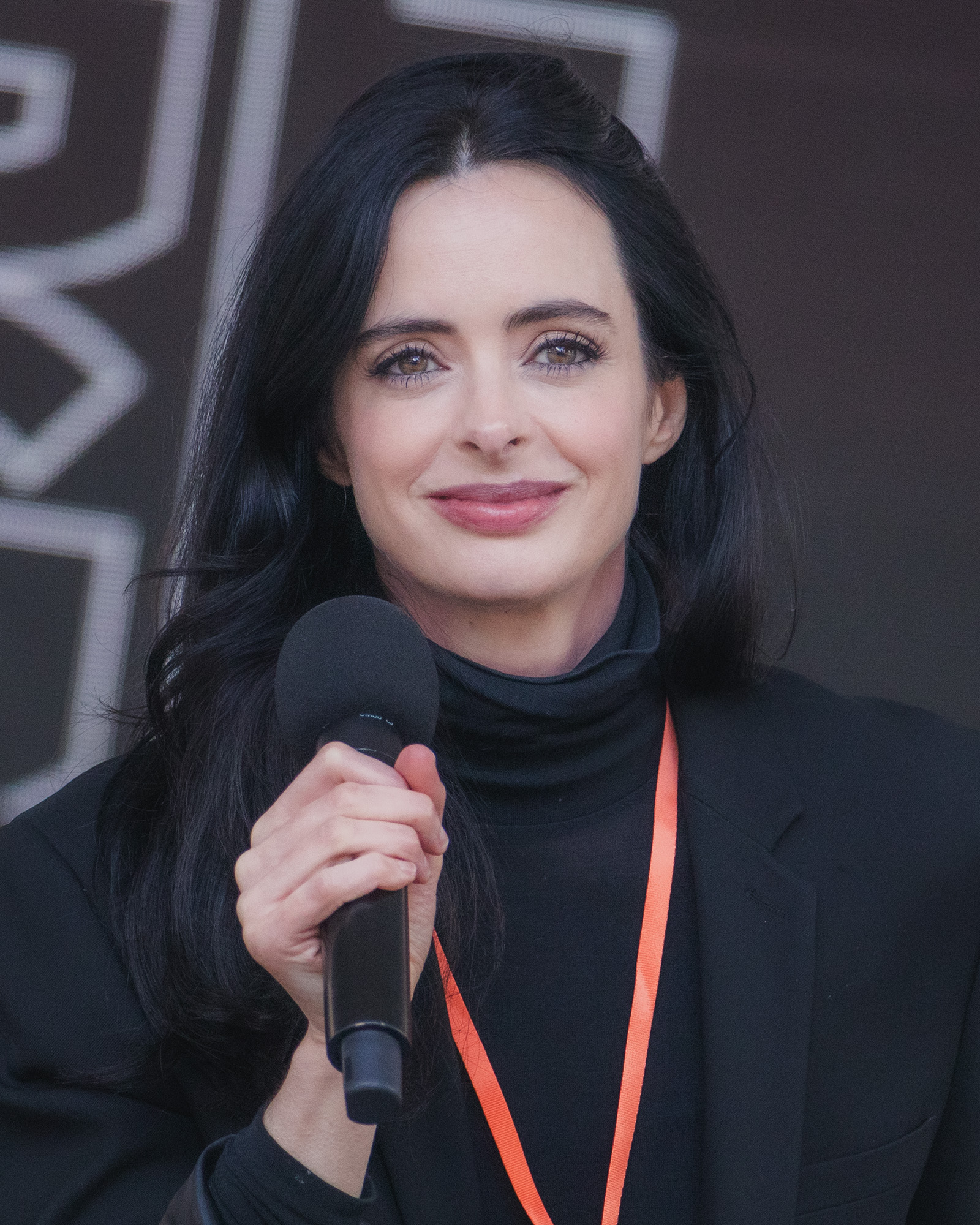
- Ritter at the 2025 LA Times Festival of Books in Los Angeles
- Born: Krysten Alyce Ritter; December 16, 1981 (age 44); Bloomsburg, Pennsylvania, U.S.
- Occupations: Actress; musician; model; author
- Years active: 2000–present
- Partner: Adam Granduciel
- Children: 1

Krysten Alyce Ritter (born December 16, 1981) is an American actress, musician, author, and former model.

After an early modeling stint, she appeared on the UPN noir mystery series Veronica Mars (2005–2006) and the CW comedy drama series Gilmore Girls (2006–2007). Her breakthrough role was playing Jane Margolis on the AMC drama series Breaking Bad (2009–2010), a character she reprised in its spinoff film El Camino (2019). She headlined the ABC sitcom Don't Trust the B— in Apartment 23 (2012–2013) before playing the character Jessica Jones in the Marvel Cinematic Universe series Jessica Jones (2015–2019), The Defenders (2017), and Daredevil: Born Again (2026–present). She appeared in the Max miniseries Love & Death (2023).

Ritter's early film roles include the romantic comedies 27 Dresses (2007), What Happens in Vegas (2008), Confessions of a Shopaholic (2009), and She's Out of My League (2010). She wrote, co-produced, and starred in the comedy Life Happens (2011). Those roles were followed by parts in the horror comedy Vamps (2012), the comedy drama Listen Up Philip (2014), the Veronica Mars continuation (2014), the biographical drama Big Eyes (2014), the comedy drama The Hero (2017), and the dark fantasy film Nightbooks (2021).

In addition to acting, Ritter is both a singer and guitarist for the indie rock duo Ex Vivian, and she wrote the psychological thriller novel Bonfire in 2017.

== Early life ==
Krysten Alyce Ritter was born on December 16, 1981, in Bloomsburg, Pennsylvania the daughter of Garry Ritter and Kathi Taylor. She grew up in rural Shickshinny, Pennsylvania, where her mother, stepfather, and sister live; her father lives in nearby Benton. She is of German, Scottish, and English descent.

== Career ==
=== Early career ===
Ritter was scouted by a modeling agent at the age of 15 at her local shopping center, the Wyoming Valley Mall in Wilkes-Barre, Pennsylvania during a modeling event. In a Philadelphia Style magazine interview, she said she was "tall, gawky, awkward, and really, really skinny." While in high school, she traveled to New York City and Philadelphia to model. She then signed with the Elite Model Management agency and Wilhelmina Models, Ritter moved to New York and subsequently established an international modeling career, appearing in print ads and on television. She did magazine, catalog, and runway work in Tokyo, New York City, Paris, and Milan.

=== 2000s ===
Wilhelmina placed her in an audition for a Wendy's television commercial and it helped Ritter transition into acting. Her "outgoing and bubbly and funny" performance personality had entertained casting personnel, she told Philadelphia Style. She won bit parts in films starting in 2001 and played a 1950s art history student in Mona Lisa Smile in 2003. In 2006, she appeared in All This Intimacy, a two-act, Off-Broadway play by Rajiv Joseph, at the Second Stage Theatre. (Ritter later starred in the 2011 premiere of Zach Braff's play All New People, also at Second Stage, co-starring Anna Camp, David Wilson Barnes and Justin Bartha and directed by Peter DuBois.)

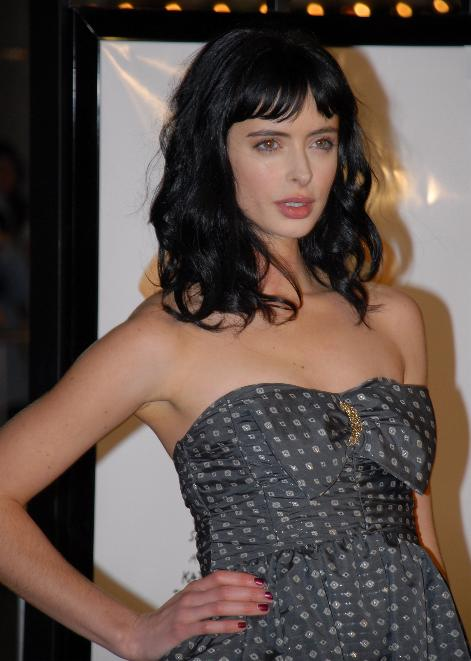
Ritter at the premiere of 27 Dresses in Westwood, Los Angeles, January 2008

Ritter's early guest starring and recurring roles on television included Gia Goodman, the daughter of Mayor Woody Goodman (Steve Guttenberg) on the second season of Veronica Mars; Rory Gilmore's friend, Lucy, on Gilmore Girls for eight episodes in 2006–07; and the first iteration of Allison Stark on the Fox sitcom 'Til Death (a role eventually played by four different actresses through the show's run).

She was cast as a young Carol Rhodes in an episode of The CW's teen drama series Gossip Girl, titled "Valley Girls," broadcast May 11, 2009. The episode was a backdoor pilot for a proposed spin-off series set in 1980s Los Angeles intended to chronicle the teenage years of character Lily van der Woodsen. Ritter said Carol, Lily's sister, is "the outcast" and "an '80s Sunset Strip rocker" to Access Hollywood. The series was not picked up by the network for the 2009–10 season, by which time Ritter appeared as Jane Margolis in the second season of Breaking Bad. The role of Jane was her breakthrough, at which Ritter expressed surprise on People's Couch Surfing program: "Talk about (a) cult following, this show really is the gift that keeps on giving."

Ritter continued working in film, often cast in romantic comedies as the lead character's best friend. After supporting roles in What Happens in Vegas and 27 Dresses (both 2008), she co-starred with Isla Fisher in Confessions of a Shopaholic. For She's Out of My League, shot over three months in Pittsburgh in 2008, she played Patty, the cynical best friend of Alice Eve's character, Molly. Ritter also starred in How to Make Love to a Woman, based on the book by adult film star Jenna Jameson; and co-starred (with Jason Behr) in the 2009 independent film The Last International Playboy, as Ozzy, a drug addict. Also in 2009, Ritter sold a television pilot she wrote based on her experiences as a model, titled Model Camp; and appeared in the comedy web series Woke Up Dead, also featuring Jon Heder.

=== 2010s ===
Ritter starred in 2010 as the sharp and quirky Lily in the Starz television series Gravity, alongside Ivan Sergei, Ving Rhames, and Rachel Hunter. The comedy-drama is about a group of outpatient suicide survivors. She also played a manager of an Irish band in the 2011 comedy Killing Bono, a film directed by Nick Hamm and based on the book Killing Bono: I Was Bono's Doppleganger, about the early days of U2. Beginning in January 2010, the film shoot lasted for six weeks in locations from Belfast to London. Ritter starred in and co-wrote (with director Kat Coiro) the 2011 independent comedy Life Happens, with Kate Bosworth and Rachel Bilson. The film is about two best friends dealing with the pregnancy and subsequent motherhood of Ritter's character. That same year, Ritter appeared alongside Alicia Silverstone and Sigourney Weaver in the comedy horror film Vamps, written and directed by Amy Heckerling. She plays a Manhattan socialite turned into a vampire.

In February 2011, Ritter landed the lead role in the ABC situation comedy Don't Trust the B— in Apartment 23. She starred as Chloe, a New York City party girl and con artist who attempts to rip off her new roommates after they move in, but she befriends and mentors one of the applicants. The series was canceled on January 22, 2013, after two seasons. Ritter and her childhood friend William Thomas Burnett formed the indie rock duo Ex Vivian, for which Ritter sings and plays guitar. Their self-titled debut album was released in 2012 on Burnett's WT Records. Ritter starred in two NBC television comedy pilots in 2013 and 2014 that were not picked up as network series. She played Nora in the pilot for Assistance, based on the play by Leslye Headland. Her casting as aerospace engineer Dr. Mary Kendricks in the astronaut-themed comedy Mission Control was announced by the network in February 2014; but on October 15, NBC said it was not moving forward with the show.

A July 9, 2013, press release said Ritter would star in Jake Hoffman's directorial debut, Asthma, about the indie rock scene in New York City. On December 5, 2014, Ritter was cast to star in the Marvel Television series Jessica Jones in the title role, as a former superhero turned private investigator. About her casting, executive producer and show-runner Melissa Rosenberg said that Ritter "brings both the hard edge and the vulnerability the role demands". Ritter said that she read the comic book to prepare for the role and expressed her delight on working with women. All 13 episodes of the first season premiered on Netflix on November 20, 2015.

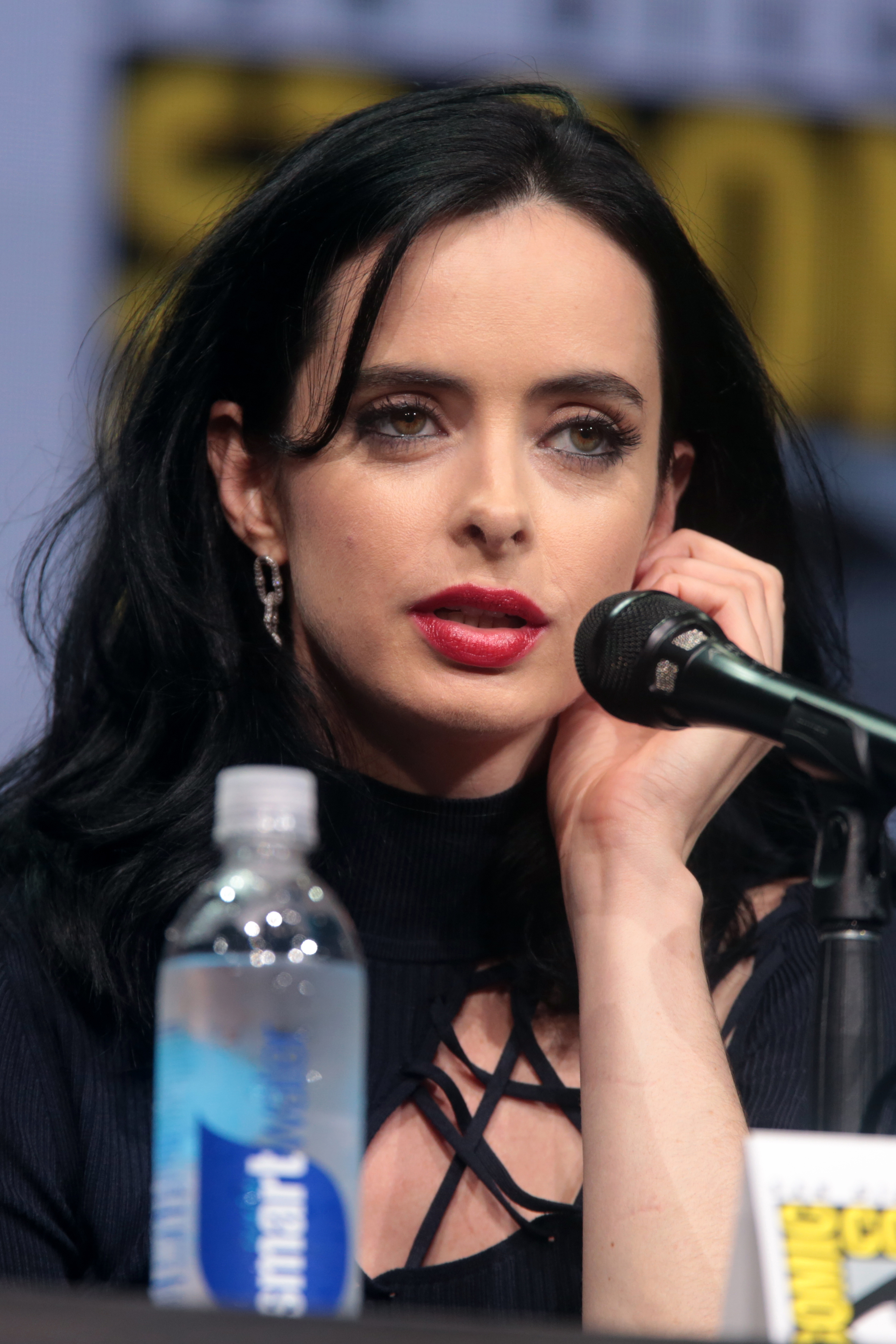
Ritter at the 2017 San Diego Comic-Con in San Diego, California

Ritter's debut novel, a psychological thriller titled Bonfire, was released on November 7, 2017, by Crown Archetype. She reprised the role of Jessica Jones on The Defenders alongside Charlie Cox as Matt Murdock / Daredevil, Mike Colter as Luke Cage, and Finn Jones as Danny Rand / Iron Fist, returning for the second season of Jessica Jones in 2018. She directed an episode in the third season of Jessica Jones, marking her directorial debut.

After the conclusion of Jessica Jones in June 2019, Ritter starred in two more films for Netflix: she first reprised her Breaking Bad role as Jane Margolis on El Camino: A Breaking Bad Movie, which premiered on October 11, 2019.

=== 2020s ===
Ritter starred in the dark fantasy film Nightbooks, based on the children's book of the same name, which was released on September 15, 2021. In 2023, Ritter starred in Love & Death, a Max biographical crime drama miniseries. She was cast as the lead of a science fiction television series Orphan Black: Echoes, a spinoff to Orphan Black, which aired on BBC America in 2024 but was canceled after a season. She later starred in Sonic the Hedgehog 3, which was released in December 2024.

In February 2025, Ritter was cast in the Dexter sequel series Dexter: Resurrection as recurring serial killer Mia LaPierre / Lady Vengeance. Her second novel, Retreat, was co-written by Lindsay Jamieson and was released on March 25, 2025 under HarperCollins Publishing. In May 2025, it was announced she would reprise her role as Jessica Jones in the second season of Daredevil: Born Again on Disney+, which premiered in March 2026. She is set to return for the third season.

== Personal life ==
Ritter moved from Brooklyn, New York to Los Angeles in 2007. She promotes animal rights and has posed for PETA ad campaigns, including a campaign warning pet owners of the dangers of leaving animals in vehicles during the summer, and another against SeaWorld keeping orcas in captivity. She is an avid knitter and has appeared on the cover of Vogue Knitting.

Ritter and musician Adam Granduciel began dating in 2014 and their son was born on July 29, 2019.

== Filmography ==
=== Film ===
Key
†	Denotes films that have not yet been released

Year	Title	Role	Notes
2001	Someone Like You	Model	Uncredited
2002	Freshening Up	Girl on couch	Short film
2002	Garmento	Poncho model	
2003	The Look	Mara	
2003	Mona Lisa Smile	Art History student	
2005	Slingshot	Beth	
2007	Heavy Petting	Innocent bystander	
2008	The Last International Playboy	Ozzy	
2008	27 Dresses	Gina the goth	
2008	What Happens in Vegas	Kelly	
2009	Glock	Beretta	Short film
2009	Confessions of a Shopaholic	Suze Cleath-Stuart	
2010	She's Out of My League	Patty	
2010	How to Make Love to a Woman	Lauren	
2011	Killing Bono	Gloria	
2011	Life Happens	Kim	Also producer and writer
2011	Margaret	Shopgirl	
2012	BuzzKill	Nicole	
2012	Vamps	Stacy Daimer	
2012	Refuge	Amy	
2014	Listen Up Philip	Melanie	
2014	Veronica Mars	Gia Goodman	
2014	Asthma	Ruby	
2014	Search Party	Christy	
2014	Big Eyes	DeAnn	
2017	The Hero	Lucy Hayden	
2019	El Camino: A Breaking Bad Movie	Jane Margolis	
2021	Nightbooks	Natacha	
2024	Sonic the Hedgehog 3	Director Rockwell	
2025	Stone Cold Fox	Goldie	

=== Television ===
Year	Title	Role	Notes
2004	Whoopi	Brynn	Episode: "The Squatters"
2004	One Life to Live	Kay	4 episodes
2004	Law & Order	Tracy Warren	Episode: "Everybody Loves Raimondo's"
2004	Tanner on Tanner	Saleswoman	2 episodes
2005	Jonny Zero	Quinn	Episode: "Pilot"
2005–2006	Veronica Mars	Gia Goodman	8 episodes
2006	The Bedford Diaries	Erin Kavenaugh	2 episodes
2006–2007	Gilmore Girls	Lucy	8 episodes
2006–2007	'Til Death	Allison Stark	5 episodes
2006	Justice	Eva	Episode: "Christmas Party"
2007	Big Day	Ellen	Episode: "The Ceremony"
2009–2010	Breaking Bad	Jane Margolis	9 episodes
2009	Gossip Girl	Young Carol Rhodes	Episode: "Valley Girls"
2009	Woke Up Dead	Cassie	Web series; 22 episodes
2010	Gravity	Lily Champagne	Main role; 10 episodes
2011	Love Bites	Cassie	Episode: "Firsts"
2012–2013	Don't Trust the B— in Apartment 23	Chloe	Main role; 26 episodes
2013	Robot Chicken	Dana Polk (voice)	Episode: "Immortal"
2013	The Cleveland Show	Gina (voice)	Episode: "California Dreamin' (All the Cleves Are Brown)"
2013	The Eric Andre Show	Herself	Episode: "Krysten Ritter; Dominic Monaghan"
2014	The Blacklist	Rowan / Nora Mills	Episode: "Lord Baltimore"
2015–2019	Jessica Jones	Jessica Jones	Lead role; 39 episodes
2016	Comedy Bang! Bang!	Herself	Episode: "Krysten Ritter Wears a Turtleneck and Black Boots"
2017	The Defenders	Jessica Jones	Main role, miniseries; 8 episodes
2022	The Simpsons	Sheila Redfield (voice)	Episode: "Meat Is Murder"
2023	Love & Death	Sherry Cleckler	Main role; 7 episodes
2024	Orphan Black: Echoes	Lucy / Young Dr. Eleanor Miller	Main role; 10 episodes
2025	Krapopolis	Persephone (voice)	Episode: "Ty Died"
2025–present	Dexter: Resurrection	Mia LaPierre / Lady Vengeance	3 episodes
2026–2027	Daredevil: Born Again	Jessica Jones	Main role; 3 episodes

=== As director ===
Year	Title	Notes
2019	Jessica Jones	Episode: "A.K.A. You're Welcome"
2021	The Girl in the Woods	4 episodes

=== Audio ===
Year	Title	Role	Notes
2018	Modern Love	Herself	Episode: "R We D8ting?"
2021	The Coldest Case	Patti Harney	8 episodes
2023	Hunting Game	Esme "Es" Compran	Audible Original
2024	The Coldest Case: The Past Has A Long Memory	Patti Harney	6 episodes

=== Music videos ===
Year	Title	Artist	Notes
1999	"Waffle"	Sevendust	Extra
2000	"Could I Have This Kiss Forever"	Whitney Houston	Extra
2017	"Holding On"	The War on Drugs	Concept

== Discography ==
Ex Vivian

- ex vivian (2012)

== Bibliography ==
- Ritter, Krysten (2017). Bonfire (Hardcover ed.). Crown Archetype. ISBN 978-1-5247-5984-1.
- Ritter, Krysten (2025). Retreat (Hardcover ed.). HarperCollins. ISBN 978-0-0633-3460-1.

== Awards and nominations ==
Awards and nominations received by Krysten Ritter
Year	Award	Category	Work	Result	Ref.
2012	Teen Choice Awards	Choice TV: Villain	Don't Trust the B— in Apartment 23	Nominated	
2015	TVLine	Performer of the Week (Note: Episode: "AKA You're a Winner!")	Marvel’s Jessica Jones	Won	
2016	Critics' Choice Awards	Best Actress in a Drama Series	Marvel’s Jessica Jones	Nominated	
2016	Dorian Awards	TV Performance of the Year – Actress	Marvel’s Jessica Jones	Nominated	
2016	Glamour Awards	International TV Actress	Marvel’s Jessica Jones	Won	
2016	Webby Awards	Special Achievement: Best Actress	Marvel’s Jessica Jones	Won	
2016	Saturn Awards	Best Actress on Television	Marvel’s Jessica Jones	Nominated	
2018	Saturn Awards	Best Supporting Actress on Television	Marvel's The Defenders	Nominated	
2019	Saturn Awards	Best Actress in a Streaming Television Series	Marvel’s Jessica Jones	Nominated	
