= Melissa Rosenberg =

American screenwriter

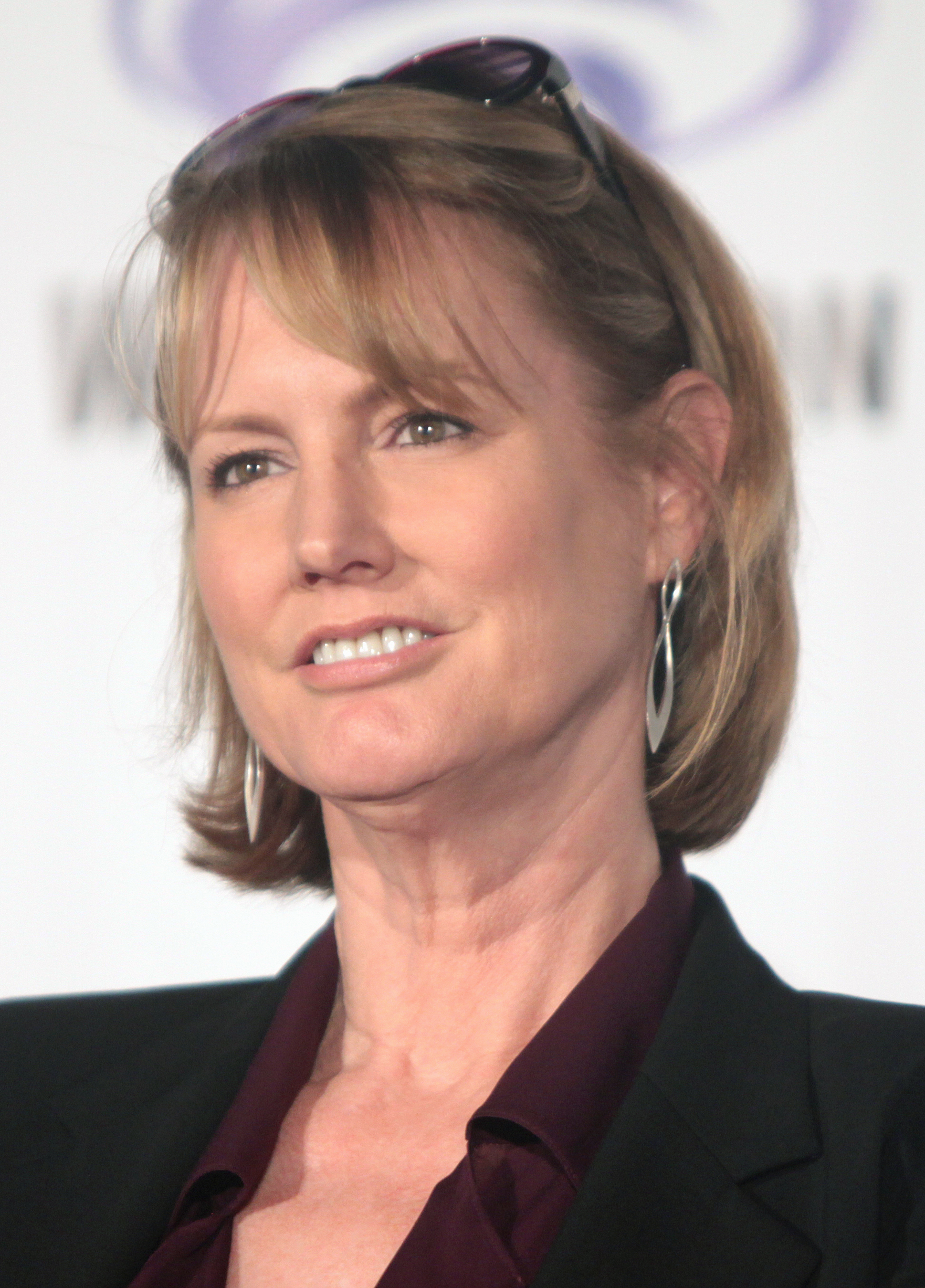
- Rosenberg in 2016
- Born: Melissa Anne Rosenberg; 1962 (age 63–64); Marin County, California, U.S.
- Education: Bennington College; University of Southern California
- Occupations: Television writer, television producer, screenwriter
- Spouse: Lev L. Spiro (m. 1995)
- Writing career
- Period: 1993–present

Melissa Anne Rosenberg (born 1962) is an American television writer, television producer, and screenwriter. She has worked in both film and television and has won a Peabody Award. She has also been nominated for two Emmy Awards, and two Writers Guild of America Awards. Since joining the Writers Guild of America, she has been involved in its board of directors and was a strike captain during the 2007–2008 Writers Guild of America strike. She supports female screenwriters through the WGA Diversity Committee and co-founded the League of Hollywood Women Writers.

She worked on several television series between 1993 and 2003 before joining The O.C.'s writing staff, eventually leaving the show to write the 2006 film Step Up. From 2006 to 2009, she served as the head writer of the Showtime series Dexter, rising to executive producer by the time she departed at the end of the fourth season. She wrote her second produced screenplay, the 2008 film adaptation of Stephenie Meyer's novel Twilight in 2007, and then adapted the novel's three sequels.

Rosenberg is also widely known as the creator of the Netflix series Jessica Jones.

== Early life ==
Rosenberg was born in Marin County, California. Her father is Jack Lee Rosenberg, a psychotherapist and the founder of integrative body psychotherapy. Her mother was Patricia Rosenberg, a lawyer. She was the second of four children by her father's first wife. Rosenberg's father was Jewish and her mother was of Irish Catholic background.

As a child, Rosenberg enjoyed presenting plays and recruiting other neighborhood children to perform in them. She attended a "massive public high school with a crowd of people bunched in a classroom and expected to learn" in Southern California. She later moved to New York City to join a small theatre company before moving again to Bennington, Vermont to attend Bennington College. She originally aspired to work in Dance and Choreography. She says she began too late, however, so she moved to Los Angeles, California to pursue a career in the film industry instead. She graduated from the University of Southern California's (USC) Peter Stark Producing Program with a Master of Fine Arts degree in film and television producing.

== Career ==
Rosenberg's first project was a dance film commissioned by Paramount Pictures that was ultimately never made. She then shifted to television writing. She first wrote for Class of '96 in 1993, and went on to work on shows including Dr. Quinn, Medicine Woman (1995–1996), Dark Skies (1996), The Magnificent Seven (1998), Ally McBeal (2001) and Birds of Prey (2002) before she came to join the writing staff of The O.C. in 2003. Leaving The O.C. at the conclusion of its first season, she was hired to write her second screenplay, the 2006 dance film Step Up. (Later, she was also offered the job of writing the sequel, Step Up 2: The Streets, but turned the offer down as she was busy with other projects.)

Rosenberg went on to write for the television series Love Monkey (2006) and Dexter (2006–2010). Her job on the Showtime series was her first on a show written for cable—she stated in 2007, "Cable is the place to be ... it's just wonderful." Rosenberg initially worked as a consulting producer and writer on the first season. She and the other members of the Dexter writing staff were nominated for a Writers Guild of America Award for best Dramatic Series at the February 2008 ceremony for their work on the first season. She gained a staff position as co-executive producer and writer for the second season in 2007 and continued in this role for the third season in 2008. The writing staff was again nominated for the WGA award at the February 2009 ceremony for their work on the third season. As part of the senior production team she was also co-nominated for the Outstanding Drama Series award at the 60th Primetime Emmy Awards. She was promoted to executive producer for the fourth season in 2009 and continued to write episodes. She was nominated for the WGA award a third consecutive time at the February 2010 ceremony for her work on the fourth season of Dexter.

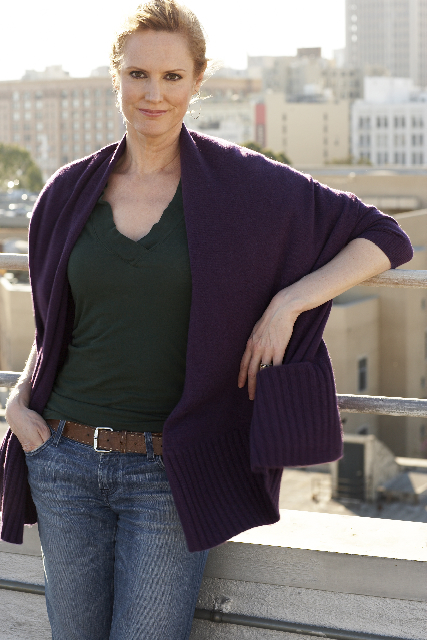
Rosenberg in 2009

Summit Entertainment, the production company which had produced Step Up, offered Rosenberg the chance to adapt Stephenie Meyer's bestselling novel Twilight into a film of the same name, which she accepted. Her primary inspiration for the adaptation was Brokeback Mountain, which she described as a "great model" of forbidden love alongside Romeo and Juliet, and thought its adaptation from short story to film was "beautiful". She was given a "manifesto" written by Meyer outlining everything that had to be included or could not be changed in the adaptation. She wrote a detailed 25-page outline in August 2007, expecting to have another two months to write the actual screenplay, but had only five weeks to finish the script before the commencement of the 2007–2008 Writers Guild of America strike. After the release of Twilight, she was hired by Summit to adapt the sequels New Moon and Eclipse, the second and third books in the series, respectively, and she had already begun drafting the New Moon screenplay by November 2008.

In July 2010, Rosenberg left her role of writer and executive producer on Dexter, explaining that "For the past four years I've been writing Dexter and one Twilight or another." She was then working on adapting the final novel in the Twilight series, Breaking Dawn, which was split into two films, and said, "I can do one Twilight and Dexter, but I couldn't do two." She was regretful about leaving the series and called it her favorite television experience to date.

Rosenberg was on the Writers Guild of America's board of directors for five years before stepping back because "you can get really, really wrapped up in it". She was very active, however, in the 2007–2008 Writers Guild of America strike, standing on the line as a strike captain. She is currently involved in the WGA Diversity Committee supporting female screenwriters, but is more active in the League of Hollywood Women Writers, which she and several other women set up while on strike, aiming to fight the "boys' club mentality" in television writing rooms.

Beginning in 2010, Rosenberg had been developing a Jessica Jones TV series for ABC, which would be based on Alias comic book series by Brian Michael Bendis. However, later in 2012, it was revealed that ABC had passed on the series. In October 2013, following a deal made by Netflix and Marvel, the series was revived as a part of four series and one mini-series commitment in which Rosenberg was brought on to be the showrunner. In December 2014, the series had cast Krysten Ritter as Jones and revealed the official title of the series as Marvel's A.K.A. Jessica Jones. In June 2015, Marvel revealed that the title for the series would be shortened to Marvel's Jessica Jones.

In August 2018, it was reported that Rosenberg had signed a deal with Warner Bros. Television and would leave Jessica Jones after season 3. In February 2019, Netflix announced it was cancelling the show after three seasons.

== Personal life ==
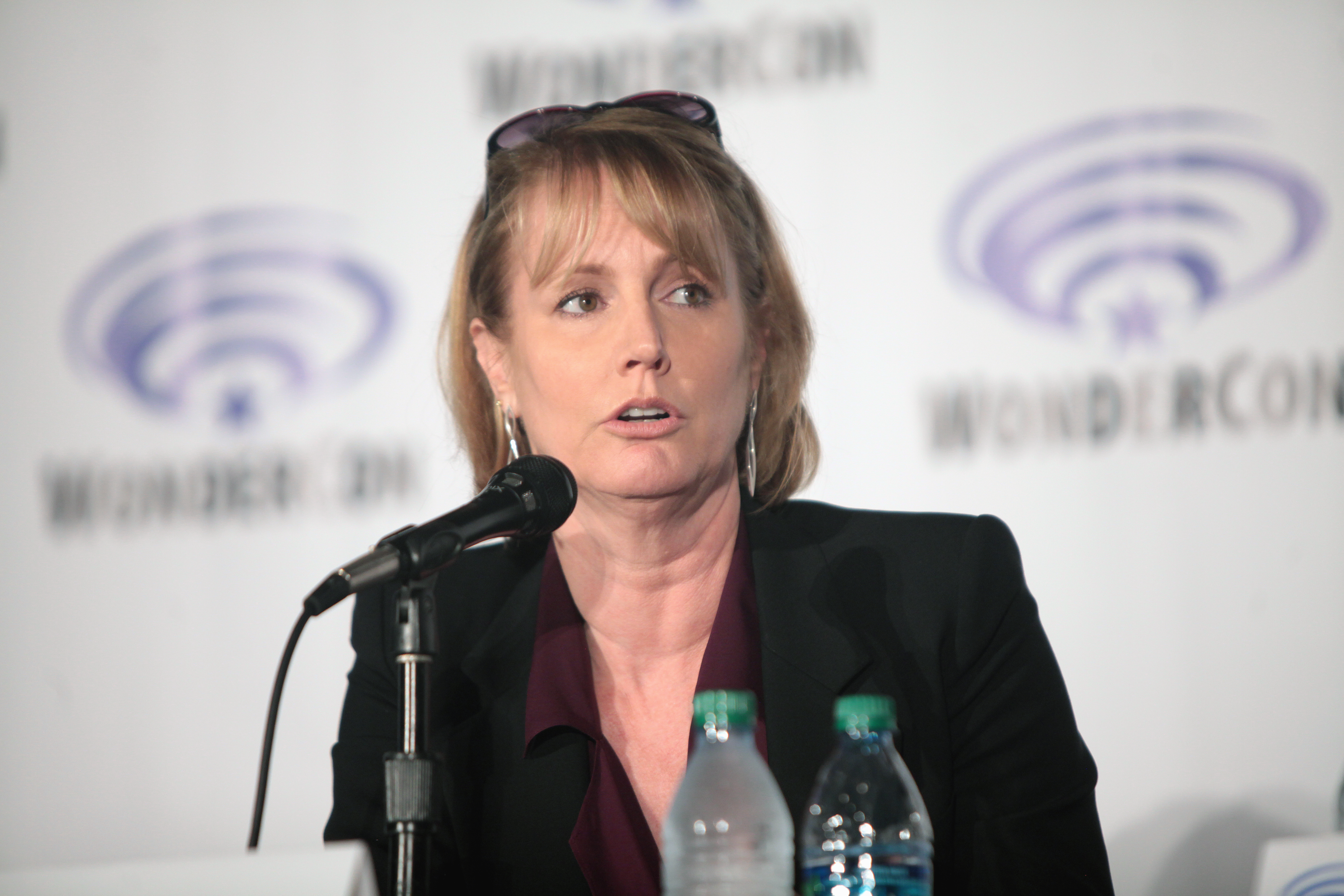
Rosenberg speaking at the 2016 Wonder con at the Los Angeles Convention center in Los Angeles, California

Rosenberg's mother died when Rosenberg was a teenager, after her father had remarried to Lynn MacCuish; he later married again to fellow therapist Beverly Kitaen-Morse. She has an older sister, Andrea (b. 1960), younger fraternal boy-girl twin brother and sister Erik and K.C. (b. 1963), and a younger half-sister, Mariya (b. 1981), by her father's second wife.

Rosenberg lives in Los Angeles with her husband Lev L. Spiro, a television director. She joked that "At our wedding, half the attendees were shrinks, the other half, their clients," after explaining that "My sister is a dance therapist; my other sister is in graduate school to become a therapist. My husband's parents are both shrinks. His uncle, two aunts and sister are shrinks."

== Filmography ==
Film writer

- Step Up (2006)
- Twilight (2008)
- The Twilight Saga: New Moon (2009)
- The Twilight Saga: Eclipse (2010)
- The Twilight Saga: Breaking Dawn – Part 1 (2011)
- The Twilight Saga: Breaking Dawn – Part 2 (2012)

Television

Year	Title	Writer	Producer	Notes
1993	Class of '96	Yes	No	Episodes "Midterm Madness", "The Adventures of Pat's Man and Robin"; Also story editor
1994	Party of Five	Yes	Supervising	
1995–1996	Dr. Quinn, Medicine Woman	Yes	No	Episodes "One Touch of Nature", "If You Love Someone..." and "Reunion"
1996	The Outer Limits	Yes	No	Episode "The Sentence"
1996	Dark Skies	Yes	No	Also story editor
1996–1997	Hercules: The Legendary Journeys	Yes	No	Episodes "Mummy Dearest" and "Beanstalks and Bad Eggs"
1998	The Magnificent Seven	Yes	Co-producer	Episodes "Working Girls" and "Witness"
2000	Boston Public	No	Consulting	Episode "Chapter Two"
2001	Ally McBeal	Yes	No	Episode "Hats Off to Larry"
2001	The Agency	Yes	Consulting	
2002	Birds of Prey	Yes	Consulting	Episodes "Slick", "Sins of the Mother" and "Nature of the Beast"
2003–2004	The O.C.	Yes	Co-executive	Episodes "The Outsider", "The Rescue" and "The Third Wheel"
2006	Love Monkey	Yes	Co-executive	Episodes "Confidence" and "Coming Out"
2006–2009	Dexter	Yes	Executive	8 episodes
2008	Alyx	Yes	Executive	TV movie
2013	Red Widow	Yes	Executive	Also creator; Episodes "Pilot" and "The Contact"
2015–2019	Jessica Jones	Yes	Executive	Also creator and showrunner

== Awards and nominations ==
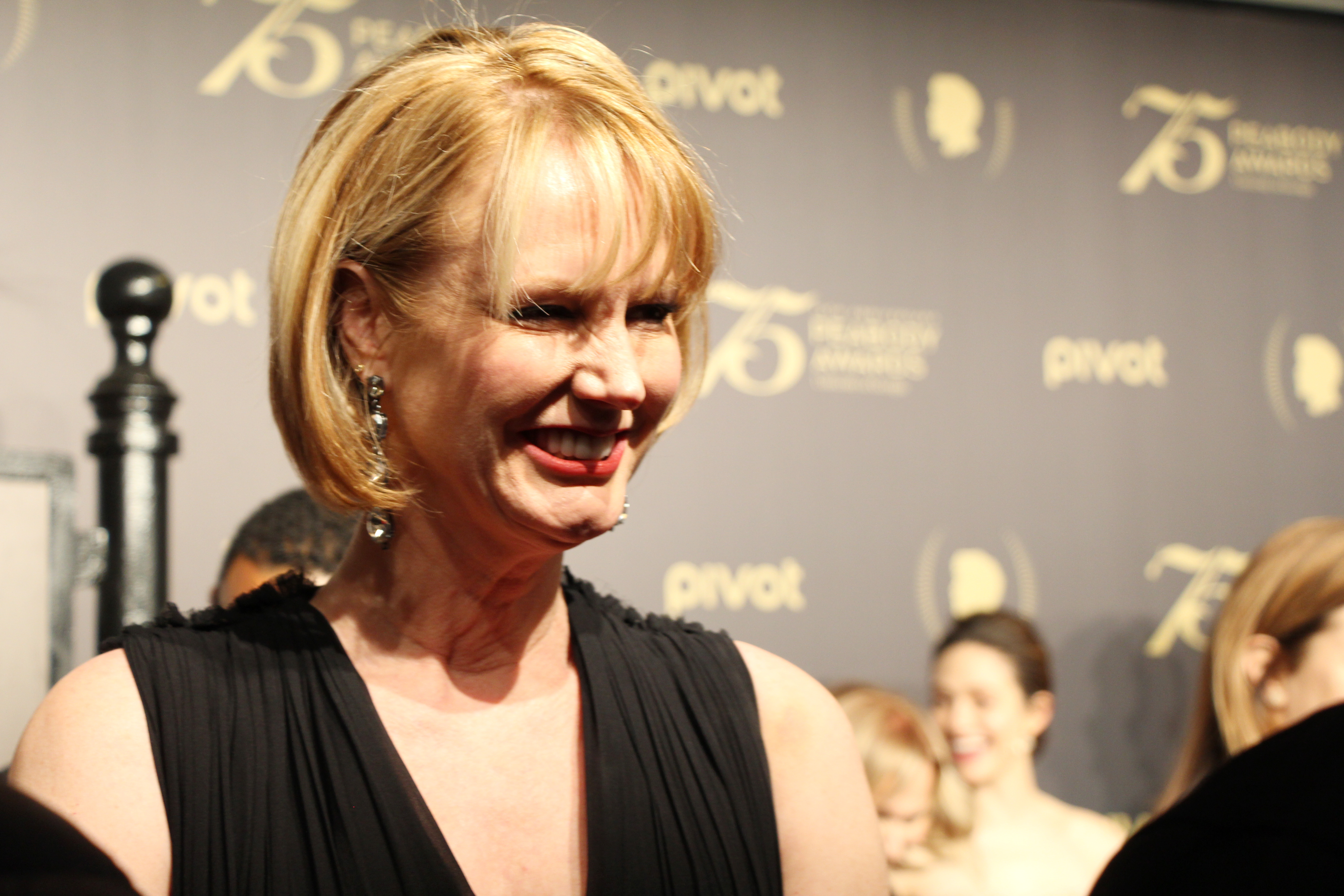
Rosenberg at the 2016 Peabody Award Ceremony

Primetime Emmy Awards

Year	Nomination/Win	Category
2010	Nomination	(Outstanding Drama Series) Dexter
2009	Nomination	(Outstanding Drama Series) Dexter
2008	Nomination	(Outstanding Drama Series) Dexter

Gold Derby / Gotham / Hugo Awards

Year	Nomination/Win	Category
2016 (Hugo)	Win	(Best Dramatic Presentation) Jessica Jones
2016 (Gotham)	Nomination	(Breakthrough Series) Jessica Jones
2010 (Gold)	Nomination	(Best Drama) Dexter

Writers Guild of America

Year	Nomination/Win	Category
2011	Nomination	(Drama Series) Dexter
2010	Nomination	(Drama Series) Dexter
2009	Nomination	(Dramatic Series) Dexter
2008	Nomination	(Dramatic Series) Dexter

PGA Awards

Year	Nomination/Win	Category
2010	Nomination	(Outstanding Producer on Episodic Television, Drama) Dexter
