= Foolkiller =

Fictional character(s) in American comic books by Marvel Comics

Publication information
- Publisher: Marvel Comics
- First appearance: Ross G. Everbest: Man-Thing #3 (March 1974); Greg Salinger: Cameo appearance: Omega the Unknown #8 (May 1977); Full appearance: Omega the Unknown #9 (July 1977); Kurt Gerhardt: Foolkiller #1 (October 1990); Mike Trace: Foolkiller #1 (December 2007)
- Created by: Ross G. Everbest: Steve Gerber; Val Mayerik; Greg Salinger: Steve Gerber; Mary Skrenes; Jim Mooney; Kurt Gerhardt: Steve Gerber; J. J. Birch; Mike Trace: Gregg Hurwitz; Lan Medina

In-story information
- Team affiliations: Mercs for Money
- Notable aliases: Greg Salinger: Ian Byrd; Kurt Gerhardt: Miles Fish; Gregory Ross Curtis
- Abilities: Wields "purification gun" capable of firing a disintegrating ray

The Foolkiller is the name of four fictional characters, vigilantes appearing in American comic books published by Marvel Comics, consisting of Ross G. Everbest, Greg Salinger, and Kurt Gerhardt in the primary continuity Marvel Universe, and Mike Trace in the MAX imprint.

Gregory Sallinger appears in the third season of Jessica Jones, portrayed by Jeremy Bobb.

== Publication history ==
The original Foolkiller was introduced in Man-Thing #3 and killed in the next issue. He was created by Steve Gerber and Val Mayerik. In his brief Man-Thing appearance, Foolkiller attempted to kill two major characters in the series: F.A. Schist, a real estate developer whose projects threatened the ecology of the Florida Everglades, and Richard Rory, a disc jockey who had denounced Foolkiller's activities. His real name was not given until a later flashback in The Amazing Spider-Man #225, which stated that it was Ross G. Everbest (a variant of Gerber's Reg Everbest pseudonym with his middle name attached to it).

Gerber, Mary Skrenes and Jim Mooney created Greg Salinger, the second version of the character, which first appeared in Omega the Unknown #9 (plus a one-panel cameo in #8, which was written by Roger Stern and drawn by Lee Elias).

Gerber's Foolkiller miniseries, illustrated by Joe Brozowski under the pseudonym "J. J. Birch", was published from October 1990 to October 1991. It focused on a new version, Kurt Gerhardt.

A new Foolkiller, Mike Trace, has appeared in two five-issue MAX series: Foolkiller (2007) and Foolkiller: White Angels (2009). He was created by Gregg Hurwitz and Lan Medina.

In 2016, Marvel announced Foolkiller's return in his own series, penned by Max Bemis, picking up the story of Greg Salinger as a personal therapist and, again, as Foolkiller.

== Fictional character biography ==
=== Ross G. Everbest ===
The original Foolkiller, Ross Everbest, is more of a reactionary crusader than subsequent versions of the character. Upset by anti-Vietnam War protests and counterculture movements, he decides that sinners, dissidents, and criminals alike were "fools" who must be eliminated, and that he had been chosen by God to do so. He was inspired by a faith healer, Reverend Mike Pike, who cured his childhood paralysis. As a result, Everbest becomes an evangelist with Pike as his mentor. After catching Pike in a drunken orgy, Everbest kills him, preserves his corpse in formaldehyde, and uses Pike's money to fund his vigilante activities. He dons a flamboyant Zorro-like costume and begins using a "purification gun", a raygun which disintegrates people instantly. Some of his victims are given a 24-hour warning in the form of a calling card: "Foolkiller / e pluribus unum / You have 24 hours to live. Use them to repent or be forever damned to the pits of hell where goeth all fools. Today is the last day of the rest of your life. Use it wisely or die a fool".

Foolkiller had sought to kill Ted Sallis (whom he knew to be the Man-Thing based on connecting news reports), disc jockey Richard Rory, and businessman F.A. Schist. During a struggle with Man-Thing, Foolkiller dies after being impaled in the heart by a shard of glass from the tank containing Pike.

=== Greg Salinger ===
Gregory P. "Greg" Salinger, imprisoned for disorderly conduct, heard the story of the first Foolkiller from his cellmate, Richard Rory. After being released, Salinger steals Foolkiller's equipment and assumes his identity, using the "purification gun" to kill a number of people in New York. Unlike his religiously inspired predecessor, Salinger defined "fools" as those guilty of materialism and mediocrity, or anyone who lacked "a poetic nature".

Rory, feeling responsible for Salinger's breakdown and crimes, tries to help the Defenders arrest Salinger, by persuading him that he could join them as a superhero. However, Salinger had decided the Defenders were "fools" after their failure to capture another supervillain; he sought to kill Lunatik, and burned down their headquarters and was captured by the Defenders, but escaped in a road accident. Salinger reappears, studying at Empire State University, where teaching assistant Peter Parker (Spider-Man) befriended him, then stopped him in the midst of another killing spree. When a homeless witness suggested that only a fool would fight Spider-Man, Salinger attempted to shoot himself, but was stopped, arrested, found criminally insane and institutionalized at the Central Indiana State Mental Institution.

Salinger (now wearing an armored costume, and wielding conventional weaponry) would go on to join Deadpool's Heroes for Hire (later rechristened the Mercs for Money). While with the group, Salinger acquired a degree in psychiatry, which led to him becoming Deadpool's reluctant personal therapist. S.H.I.E.L.D. later recruits Salinger as a psychiatrist to rehabilitate supervillains. If they do not cooperate or make progress, then he is allowed to execute them.

=== Kurt Gerhardt ===
Kurt Gerhardt reached a state of homicidal despair after the murder of his father, a divorce, the loss of his bank job, and being robbed at work. Gerhardt gets in contact with Greg Salinger and is directed to an old confidant who provides him with the Foolkiller costume and "purification gun". Initially, Gerhardt directs his vigilante campaign at criminals, garnering some praise from the public. His definition of "fools" broadens over time and leads him to kill in public. After escaping from the police, Gerhardt has his face altered with the assistance of Salinger's friend and leaves for Arizona.

After repeatedly attempting to gain therapy from and then teach back what it means to be Foolkiller, all while acting on the orders of the Hood, Gerdhart is shot and killed by Salinger.

== Powers and abilities ==
Each version of Foolkiller (except Mike Trace) primarily used a "purification gun", a pistol capable of shooting a laser-like beam of energy capable of completely incinerating a human being within seconds. They also used mobile computer systems and surveillance systems to locate and track victims. The first two also employed an armored truck outfitted with similar systems which also acted as a mobile headquarters.

== Other versions ==
=== Mike Trace ===
A new five-issue Foolkiller miniseries, written by Gregg Hurwitz, debuted under Marvel's MAX adult imprint, in October 2007. In a 2007 interview with Newsarama, Hurwitz declared: "I'm a Punisher guy. What Garth Ennis has done with Frank Castle really is what made me realize what comic books could do. The Foolkiller is obviously different in a number of ways from the Punisher, but he's also perhaps the closest thing the Marvel Universe has to him." Similarly, Axel Alonso stated "He was interested in writing a crime thriller and Punisher was off the table."

The Foolkiller of the Marvel MAX title is Mike Trace, a man who treats his murders as works of art. Typically, he leaves bodies at the scene along with ironic indications of why they were killed. In one case, he murders a corporate industrialist and leaves the body in a trashcan filled with toxic waste from the industrialist's own factories. Rather than the mainline character's purification gun, Trace uses a swordstick.

=== Foolkillers 2099 ===
A cabal of fundamentalist super-soldiers modelled themselves after the Foolkillers of the 20th century. One of their number was encountered by the X-Men of 2099 after he embarked on a mission to assassinate the members of Xi'an Chi Xan's original team, the Lawless.

== In other media ==
Gregory Sallinger appears in the third season of Jessica Jones, portrayed by Jeremy Bobb. This version is a villainous polymath who is well-trained in Greco-Roman wrestling and holds degrees in law, psychology, chemistry, engineering, particle physics, and biology. Additionally, he had an abusive father who preferred his brother Donny over him and would go on to kill Donny and his friend and fellow wrestler Nathan Silva out of jealousy. In the present, Gregory seeks to kill Erik Gelden when he finds out about his murders before shifting his attention to Jessica Jones, whom he accuses of being a fraud due to her reliance on her superpowers. In pursuit of his goal, he kidnaps and tortures Gelden and kills Dorothy Walker. Despite being hospitalized by Dorothy's daughter Trish Walker, he uses this to blackmail Jones into destroying her evidence on him, then forces her to help him leave New York. However, she records him confessing to murdering Dorothy, leading to his arrest and Trish eventually killing him.

== Collected editions ==
=== Kurt Gerhardt ===
Title	Material Collected	Published Date	ISBN
Marvel Firsts: The 1990's Omnibus	Foolkiller (vol. 1) #1 and Ghost Rider (1990) #1, Deathlok (1990) #1, New Warriors (1990) #1, Darkhawk #1, Sleepwalker #1, X-Force (1991) #1, X-Factor (1986) #71, Warlock And The Infinity Watch #2, Death's Head II (1992A) #1, Silver Sable And The Wild Pack #1, Terror Inc. (1992) #1, Night Thrasher: Four Control #1, Darkhold: Pages From The Book Of Sins #1, Nightstalkers #1, Spider-Man 2099 (1992) #1, Venom: Lethal Protector #1, Cable (1993) #1, Deadpool: The Circle Chase #1, Thunderstrike (1993) #1, Gambit (1993) #1, War Machine (1994) #1, Blackwulf #1, Force Works #1, Blade The Vampire-Hunter (1994) #1, Generation X San Diego Preview, Fantastic Force (1994) #1, Web Of Spider-Man (1985) #118, Bishop #1, X-Man #1, Elektra: Root Of Evil #1, Green Goblin #1, Captain Marvel (1995) #1, Heroes For Hire (1997) #1, Maverick #1, Quicksilver #1, Spider-Girl (1998) #1, Slingers #0, Spider-Woman (1999) #1, Deathlok (1999) #1, Warlock (1999) #1; and material from Captain America Annual #9, Web Of Spider-Man (1985) #100, Marvel Comics Presents (1988) #147 and #158, and Tales Of The Marvel Universe.	August 19, 2015	978-0785198161
Marvel Firsts: The 1990's Vol. 1	Foolkiller (vol. 1) #1 and Ghost Rider (1990) #1, Deathlok (1990) #1, New Warriors (1990) #1, Darkhawk #1, Sleepwalker #1, X-Force (1991) #1, X-Factor (1986) #71, Warlock And The Infinity Watch #2, Death's Head II (1992A) #1, Silver Sable And The Wild Pack #1, Terror Inc. (1992) #1, Night Thrasher: Four Control #1, Darkhold: Pages From The Book Of Sins #1 and material from Captain America Annual #9	April 20, 2016	978-0785198338

=== Greg Salinger ===
Title	Material Collected	Published Date	ISBN
Foolkiller: Psycho Therapy	Foolkiller (vol. 3) #1–5	July 11, 2017	978-1302904784

=== Mike Trace ===
Title	Material Collected	Published Date	ISBN
Foolkiller: Fool's Paradise	Foolkiller (vol. 2) #1–5	August 20, 2008	978-0785123866
Foolkiller: White Angels	Foolkiller: White Angels #1–5	April 29, 2009	978-0785132752
