= The Emperor of Ocean Park (TV series) =

2024 mystery thriller series by Sherman Payne

- Genre: Mystery; thriller
- Created by: Sherman Payne
- Based on: The Emperor of Ocean Park by Stephen L. Carter
- Starring: Grantham Coleman; Forest Whitaker; Tiffany Mack; Paulina Lule
- Composers: Amanda Delores; Patricia Jones
- Country of origin: United States
- Original language: English
- No. of seasons: 1
- No. of episodes: 10

Production
- Executive producers: Sherman Payne; Damian Marcano; John Wells; Shukree Tilghman; Erin Jontow
- Producer: Terri Murphy
- Running time: 44–57 minutes
- Production companies: John Wells Productions; Warner Bros. Television

Original release
- Network: MGM+
- Release: July 14 – September 15, 2024

The Emperor of Ocean Park is an American mystery thriller television series based on Stephen L. Carter's novel of the same name. It premiered on July 14, 2024, on MGM+.

== Premise ==
Set in the worlds of politics, Ivy League academia, and the beaches of Martha's Vineyard, the series follows a law professor whose quiet life is shattered when his father dies of an apparent heart attack. The nature of the judge's death is questioned by a former journalist and inveterate conspiracy theorist. She believes a failed Black nominee to the Supreme Court met with foul play.

== Cast and characters ==
=== Main ===
- Grantham Coleman as Talcott Garland
  - Amir Henderson as young Talcott
- Forest Whitaker as Judge Oliver Garland, father of Talcott, Addison, and Mariah, husband of Claire
  - Omar Miller as young Oliver Garland
- Tiffany Mack as Mariah Garland-Denton
- Paulina Lule as Kimmer Madison Garland, Talcott's wife

=== Supporting ===
- Henry Simmons as Addison Garland
  - Phillip Cusic as young Addison
- Bryan Greenberg as Howard Denton, Mariah's husband
- Torrey Hanson as Jack Ziegler
- Ora Jones as Claire Garland, mother of Talcott, Addison, and Mariah, wife of Judge Oliver Garland
- Raluca Lăzăruț as Szuza
- Jasmine Batchelor as Maxine

== Episodes ==
No.	Title	Directed by	Teleplay by	Original release date
1	"Chapter One"	Damian Marcano	Sherman Payne	July 14, 2024
2	"Chapter Two"	Damian Marcano	Sherman Payne	July 21, 2024
3	"Chapter Three"	Cheryl Dunye	Shukree Tilghman	July 28, 2024
4	"Chapter Four"	Cheryl Dunye	Francesca Butler	August 4, 2024
5	"Chapter Five"	Damian Marcano	Cynthia Adarkwa	August 11, 2024
6	"Chapter Six"	Damian Marcano	Sherman Payne & Jabari McDonald	August 18, 2024
7	"Chapter Seven"	Quyen Tran	Sherman Payne & Jabari McDonald	August 25, 2024
8	"Chapter Eight"	Quyen Tran	Shukree Hassan Tilghman	September 1, 2024
9	"Chapter Nine"	Damian Marcano	Francesca Butler	September 8, 2024
10	"Chapter Ten"	Damian Marcano	Sherman Payne	September 15, 2024

== Production ==
=== Development ===
In January 2023, MGM+ began developing a series based on Stephen L. Carter's best-selling novel, with Sherman Payne writing several episodes and Damian Marcano set to direct. The series was produced by John Wells Productions and Warner Bros. Television.

In April 2023, it was announced that the pay channel had ordered ten episodes of the series. Producer Llewellyn Wells was later signed on in January 2024.

=== Casting ===
In November 2023, it was announced that Grantham Coleman would star in the lead role, with Tiffany Mack and Paulina Lule also starring. Later on, Forest Whitaker joined the cast in January 2024. Henry Simmons, Bryan Greenberg and Jasmine Batchelor join the cast, as well as with Ora Jones and Torrey Hanson joined the cast in February 2024.

=== Filming ===
Principal photography began in Chicago on January 10, 2024, and wrapped on April 25. Filming also took place in Lemont, IL.

== Release ==
The show premiered on MGM+ on July 14, 2024.

=== Marketing ===
A trailer for the series was released in May 2024.
