= Jessica Jones season 3 =

Jessica Jones
- Season 3
- Promotional poster
- Showrunners: Melissa Rosenberg; Scott Reynolds
- Starring: Krysten Ritter; Rachael Taylor; Eka Darville; Benjamin Walker; Sarita Choudhury; Jeremy Bobb; Tiffany Mack; Carrie-Anne Moss
- No. of episodes: 13

Release
- Original network: Netflix
- Original release: June 14, 2019

Season chronology
- ← Previous; Season 2

The third and final season of the American television series Jessica Jones, which is based on the Marvel Comics character of the same name, follows Jones as she teams up with her mother's killer, Trish Walker, to take down a highly intelligent psychopath until a devastating loss reveals conflicting ideals that pits them against each other. It is set in the Marvel Cinematic Universe (MCU), sharing continuity with the films and other television series of the franchise. The season is produced by Marvel Television in association with ABC Studios and Tall Girls Productions, with Melissa Rosenberg and Scott Reynolds serving as showrunners.

Krysten Ritter stars as Jones alongside Rachael Taylor as Walker, with Eka Darville and Carrie-Anne Moss also returning from previous seasons, as well as J. R. Ramirez, Mike Colter, and David Tennant in guest roles. They are joined by Benjamin Walker, Sarita Choudhury, Jeremy Bobb, and Tiffany Mack. The third season was ordered in April 2018, a month after the second season was released. Filming for the season began by the end of that June, with Ritter making her directorial debut during the season.

The season was released on Netflix on June 14, 2019, and consists of 13 episodes. Netflix canceled the series on February 18, 2019.

== Episodes ==
| No. overall | No. in season | Title | Directed by | Written by | Original release date |
|---|---|---|---|---|---|
| 27 | 1 | "A.K.A. The Perfect Burger" | Michael Lehmann | Melissa Rosenberg | June 14, 2019 |
Jessica Jones has returned to helping people, starting with returning Cassie Yasdan to her mother from Mexico, to which her father Mitch took her after losing a custody battle. A video of Jessica tossing Mitch in the air goes viral. Malcolm Ducasse continues to work for Jeri Hogarth, though he is disturbed by the methods used to help a baseball player client out of a drunk driving incident, which results in another accident that harms the client's career. Hogarth, still suffering from ALS, asks Jones to end her suffering, but she refuses. She visits a former flame, Kith Lyonne, who is married to Peter, a law professor. Dorothy Walker asks Jones to look for her daughter Trish, who has disappeared. Jones decides to help just to pacify Dorothy. Jones discovers that Trish has become a vigilante, using enhanced abilities that resulted from Karl Malus' experiment. When Jones intervenes in Trish's confrontation with a criminal, Trish rebuffs Jones. Jones goes to a bar and meets a man named Erik Gelden. Jones and Gelden go back to her apartment, but are ambushed by a masked assailant, who manages to stab Jones in the abdomen with a knife before fleeing.
| 28 | 2 | "A.K.A. You're Welcome" | Krysten Ritter | Hilly Hicks, Jr. | June 14, 2019 |
In flashback, Trish discovers she has enhanced abilities following her killing of Jones' mother, Alisa. Believing she would be a better hero than Jones, Trish undergoes extensive physical training to become a vigilante. She spots Jones on the street and calls her, but Jessica hangs up on her. Trish manages to catch a cell phone thief, but he and the victim recognize her, convincing her to adopt a disguise. Later, the thief attempts to sue her for injuring his neck. Malcolm later blackmails him into lowering the cost after discovering that his son, who looks up to him, is actually not his and threatens to tell him the truth. Trish moves into a cheaper apartment, much to Dorothy's chagrin, but continues appearing on television. She begins to stalk Andrew Brandt, a man who put his half-sister in the hospital over a statue that was willed to her. Trish stakes out his apartment before attacking him, during which Jones appears at the scene. In the present, Trish learns of Jones' hospitalization and visits her. They believe that Brandt was behind the attack, and Jones sarcastically thanks Trish for giving her his name.
| 29 | 3 | "A.K.A. I Have No Spleen" | Anton Cropper | Lisa Randolph | June 14, 2019 |
During surgery, Jones has her spleen removed and is only allowed to leave the hospital after agreeing to her new assistant Gillian's demands that she take numerous medications. Jeri meets with Kith for lunch. Later, she has Malcolm dig up incriminating information on Kith's husband Peter in an attempt to break them up. Malcolm plants a camera in Peter's office and discovers him having a tryst with one of his students. However, Kith reveals to Hogarth that she and her husband have an open relationship and will not get attached to her. Jones gets help from Hogarth in finding Brandt's statue, but while toying with Trish, she collapses in the street from dehydration and Trish makes off with her leads. Nevertheless, Jones locates the statue after confronting Trish, then captures and interrogates Brandt, learning her attacker was not Brandt or anyone associated with him and leaves him for Trish. As Jones recollects herself at home, Erik arrives to check up on her. Jones then has an epiphany and realizes that the attacker was after Erik.
| 30 | 4 | "A.K.A. Customer Service Is Standing By" | Liesl Tommy | Jamie King | June 14, 2019 |
Erik explains that he owed money to criminal Sal Blaskowski and had one week to fulfill it. He reveals that he is an empath and can sense if someone has done wrong, though it causes him pain. Together, Jones and Erik find people he has blackmailed and collect the money while also outing their crimes to the police. Trish picks up on Blaskowski from Erik and breaks into Malcolm's office so that she can continue to investigate her. Malcolm digs up more dirt on Peter and discovers that he has been embezzling from scholarship funds that were made in his daughter's memory. Hogarth decides not to act on releasing this information as it would ruin both Peter and Kith. Erik leaves Jones to give the money to Blaskowski, but she decides to drown him for being late. Trish arrives and rescues him, but accidentally stabs Blaskowski, though she survives. Jones finally finds her attacker: Gregory Sallinger, an intellectually formidable, psychopathic serial killer. Jones leaves when Sallinger threatens to release criminal evidence against her, and reluctantly asks for Trish's help in capturing him.
| 31 | 5 | "A.K.A. I Wish" | Mairzee Almas | J. Holtham | June 14, 2019 |
Jones and Trish begin to stake out Sallinger's apartment. When he leaves, Trish breaks in to collect evidence while Jones follows Sallinger. She finds out that he has been spying on Erik's sister Brianna, a prostitute. Jones confronts the two and realizes that they are in danger and has Brianna stay at Malcolm's place for protection, though this does not last long as her pimp, Gor, arrives and takes her away. Hogarth changes her mind and releases the information on Peter, devastating Kith. Unable to convince Kith that Hogarth is manipulating them, Peter commits suicide while making a case video against Hogarth. Jones and Trish continue to argue about Alisa's death, with Gillian insisting they work out their differences. Afterwards, they use the evidence they collected to trace Sallinger to an abandoned train car that houses the bodies he has collected. Jones sets off a gas trap and Trish rescues her with the two admitting their faults over the Alisa argument as the former speaks with the cops. Later, Sallinger ambushes Erik in his hotel room.
| 32 | 6 | "A.K.A. Sorry Face" | Tim Iacofano | Jesse Harris | June 14, 2019 |
Sallinger begins torturing Erik and trying to get him to confess to "cheating". While doing so, he figures out Erik's empath abilities when he stands close to him and he starts to bleed profusely. Jones learns of Erik's kidnapping and forces Trish to reveal her powers to Dorothy in an attempt to dissuade her from crime fighting, but Dorothy angrily abandons Trish. Malcolm locates Brianna and beats up Gor, ultimately convincing her to return after telling her of Erik's kidnapping and begins an affair with her. Hogarth attempts to apologize to Kith, but is stopped by her son who rebuffs her. The scandal causes many of her clients to leave, though she manages to keep a few. However, her former partner Steven Benowitz steals Rand Enterprises from her. Jones and Trish manage to get a lead on Sallinger and find him. They rescue Erik and arrest Sallinger. However, Detective Eddy Costa reveals that Sallinger will not be tried due to lack of evidence. Erik cannot testify as he will get a year in prison for blackmail and will suffer pain due to his powers. Jones and Erik comfort each other.
| 33 | 7 | "A.K.A. The Double Half-Wappinger" | Larry Teng | Nancy Won | June 14, 2019 |
Hogarth becomes Sallinger's attorney. Jones and Trish believe that the death of Sallinger's brother Donny was his first kill and head to Wappinger Falls to look into it. The local police chief Ronnie Velasco refuses to aid Jones, so she and Trish steal the police files. They believe that Donny's death was an accident, but discover that Sallinger had a friend on his high school wrestling team named Nathan Silva who mysteriously disappeared. They visit the Silvas and find that Nathan's body was buried under their gazebo all these years, exposing the crime. Hogarth begins looking into the masked vigilante helping Jones and discovers that she has been taking out their clients. Malcolm's girlfriend Zaya Okonjo, an employee of Hogarth's, reviews security footage and spots Malcolm interacting with Trish. As Trish gets publicity as a vigilante, Jones and Malcolm confront Sallinger at wrestling practice. Sallinger taunts Jessica as someone who uses brute force because they lack discipline, and challenges her to a wrestling match. She accepts and is pinned down by him, but she unnerves him by revealing that she knows he killed Nathan, and humiliates him by tossing him about the wrestling mat.
| 34 | 8 | "A.K.A. Camera Friendly" | Stephen Surjik | Scott Reynolds | June 14, 2019 |
Jones receives a video from Sallinger teasing his next murder. She recruits Trish to help look for the victim while contacting Costa to check Sallinger's apartment. They find a decoy named Joby hired to watch over his home, so Jones films herself destroying Sallinger's trophies and diplomas and sends the video to him to taunt him. Malcolm discovers that Zaya doctored the security footage of himself with Trish even though she is angry with him. Later, Hogarth demands that Trish be unmasked for the public and wages war against super powered vigilantes. Dorothy has Jones do an interview with Thembi Wallace which mostly consists of her accusing Sallinger and warning his next victim. Jones and Trish go searching for Sallinger and believe that his next victim will be Mona Lee of GT Agrochemical. Sallinger shows up at his apartment apparently clean of any wrongdoing. After escaping paparazzi, Jones realizes that Dorothy is Sallinger's next victim. Trish finds her mother murdered by Sallinger, then races to Sallinger's apartment to kill him with Jones rushing to stop her.
| 35 | 9 | "A.K.A. I Did Something Today" | Jennifer Getzinger | Lisa Randolph | June 14, 2019 |
Trish seriously injures Sallinger before Jones stops her and they escape. She is sent a photo of proof of Trish's attack by a hospitalized Sallinger, who threatens to release it unless Jones destroys all evidence of Nathan's death. To save Trish, a reluctant Jones and Erik force one of Erik's blackmailed associates, Officer Carl Nussbaumer, to lead them into the forensics lab, where Jones successfully removes the evidence. Trish, however, is upset over Jones choosing her over Sallinger as that means he will walk free. Hogarth is approached by Kith's son, Laurent in helping them in a case against former supporter Demetri Patseras. Hogarth confronts Kith and admits that she is still in love with her. Kith later accepts Hogarth's help. Malcolm comes clean with the footage, but claims that he doctored it himself and quits. While looking over the undoctored footage, Hogarth sees that Trish is the masked vigilante. Costa visits Jones' apartment and tells her he's been forced into taking a sabbatical for losing the evidence. The next day, investigators arrive and suspect Jones of murdering Nussbaumer.
| 36 | 10 | "A.K.A. Hero Pants" | Sanford Bookstaver | Hilly Hicks, Jr. & Jamie King | June 14, 2019 |
The investigators cannot find any evidence on Jones, but they do find a folder on Nussbaumer which Jones allows them to take. As Trish prepares for Dorothy's funeral, she is approached by the investigators and insists that Jones is innocent. Jones begins to suspect Erik of the murder. Malcolm asks to rejoin Alias Investigations, and Jones accepts, assigning him to look into the files on Jace Montero, a shady developer. He soon breaks up with Zaya due to their differing work. A sober Brianna returns to stay at his place and the two begin a relationship. Kith comes to Hogarth about Patseras. She angrily tells her to stop using her dirty tactics, but when Patseras accuses her of fraud, she accepts her help in "coloring outside the line[s]". Jones and Trish reminisce about Dorothy and attend the funeral. Gillian calls Jones and informs her that the police have a warrant for her arrest. Jones realizes that Trish murdered Nussbaumer and leaves. Later, she attempts to trail Trish, but is arrested. Later, Erik watches in horror as Trish attacks and murders Montero in his trailer office.
| 37 | 11 | "A.K.A. Hellcat" | Jennifer Getzinger | Jane Espenson | June 14, 2019 |
In flashback, Dorothy forces Trish to take up acting after their father "leaves". Through a series of calculated plans, Dorothy has Trish earn a coveted leading role for a sitcom on ABC, claiming that she "owes the world". After discovering her mother dead, Trish goes after Sallinger, but is stopped by Jones, who tries to comfort her. She approaches Erik about helping out with catching criminals, and they go after Nussbaumer by recording a confession. Trish accidentally kills him in a rage and Erik's headaches go away. When Jones is suspected of murdering Nussbaumer, Trish and Erik plot to divert the investigators by attacking Montero and taking responsibility for Nussbaumer. Hogarth approaches Trish with her knowledge of her activities and asks her to steal something from Patseras. Erik is revealed to have called the cops on Jones so that she would have an alibi. Trish and Erik confront Montero, but an enraged Trish ends up murdering Montero. Convinced killing is more effective, Trish decides to continue with this method as Erik's headaches return.
| 38 | 12 | "A.K.A. A Lotta Worms" | Sarah Boyd | Scott Reynolds | June 14, 2019 |
Jones is let go from police custody and returns to Alias Investigations to find Erik recuperating. He tells her that Trish is now killing victims intentionally and Jones rushes to the hospital to save Sallinger from Trish. She takes him to Hogarth, but he opts to go back to his apartment and wait for Trish to arrive and attack him. Instead, Jones arrives to set a trap for Trish, which is successful. Malcolm and Erik knock her out while Jones steals the camera that contained the picture of Trish attacking Sallinger. Malcolm has Trish chained up in her apartment while he watches her. Sallinger later restrains Jones at her apartment and begins torturing her to get her to confess to being a "fraud". When Sallinger mentions killing Dorothy, Jones reveals she had recorded his confession, and subdues Sallinger, leaving him for the police. With Sallinger arrested, Jones frees Trish and encourages her to move on. However, Trish is still overcome with anger and murders Sallinger while he is being transported to court, before escaping and injuring several random bystanders. Hogarth, Costa, and Jones find his beaten and mutilated body in an elevator.
| 39 | 13 | "A.K.A. Everything" | Neasa Hardiman | Story by : Melissa Rosenberg & Nancy Won; Teleplay by : Melissa Rosenberg & Lisa Randolph | June 14, 2019 |
As Jones solemnly returns to her apartment, she is greeted by Luke Cage, who tells her that the hardest thing he did was send his brother, Willis Stryker, to the Raft. Knowing what she has to do, Jones decides to track Trish down. After Trish aborts her violent confrontation with Patseras due to the intervention of his frightened daughter, Hogarth lures Trish to her home so Jones can catch her. When Trish holds Kith hostage, Hogarth leaves with Trish to help her escape the country. Shortly after, Jones leaks to the news Trish's identity as the masked vigilante. Jones finds Trish attempting to escape and defeats her after she tries to stab her. As Trish is being processed, it dawns on her that she is the "bad guy". Jones gives Malcolm the keys to Alias Investigations and sees Trish being taken to the Raft. Kith breaks things off with Hogarth. Costa introduces himself to Erik and offers him a chance to work with the police. Jones tries to leave for Mexico, but after hearing Kilgrave's voice tell her to leave everyone behind, she has a change of heart and decides to stay in New York City.

== Cast and characters ==
=== Main ===
- Krysten Ritter as Jessica Jones
- Rachael Taylor as Patricia "Trish" Walker
- Eka Darville as Malcolm Ducasse
- Benjamin Walker as Erik Gelden
- Sarita Choudhury as Kith Lyonne
- Jeremy Bobb as Gregory Sallinger
- Tiffany Mack as Zaya Okonjo
- Carrie-Anne Moss as Jeri Hogarth

=== Recurring ===
- Rebecca De Mornay as Dorothy Walker
- Aneesh Sheth as Gillian
- Jessica Frances Dukes as Grace
- John Ventimiglia as Eddy Costa
- Rachel McKeon as Char
- Jamie Neumann as Brianna "Berry" Gelden

=== Notable guests ===
- J. R. Ramirez as Oscar Arocho
- Kevin Chacon as Vido Arocho
- Tijuana Ricks as Thembi Wallace
- Maury Ginsberg as Steven Benowitz
- Mike Colter as Luke Cage
- David Tennant as Kilgrave (voice)

== Production ==
=== Development ===
On April 12, 2018, a month after the release of the second season, Netflix ordered a third season of Jessica Jones. The season consists of 13 episodes. Scott Reynolds joined Melissa Rosenberg as co-showrunner for the season.

=== Casting ===
With the season order came confirmation that the returning starring cast would include Krysten Ritter as Jessica Jones, Rachael Taylor as Patricia "Trish" Walker, Eka Darville as Malcolm Ducasse, and Carrie-Anne Moss as Jeri Hogarth. Rebecca De Mornay also returns as Dorothy Walker while Benjamin Walker, Jeremy Bobb, Sarita Choudhury, Tiffany Mack, Jessica Frances Dukes and Aneesh Sheth joined the cast.

=== Design ===
In the season, Trish tries on several potential vigilante costumes, including a comics-accurate yellow and black Hellcat suit, though the outfit sports a domino mask rather that a cowl as in the comics. She opts for a casual look consisting of a black hat and bandana to cover her face, as well as a yellow shirt under a black jacket.

=== Filming ===
By the end of May 2018, Ritter was undergoing training to prepare for the start of filming "very soon", which would officially begin by the end of June. Ritter also made her directorial debut during the season.

=== Music ===
A soundtrack album for the season was released by Hollywood Records and Marvel Music digitally on July 19, 2019, with Sean Callery returning as composer.

All music composed by Sean Callery.

Jessica Jones: Season 3 (Original Soundtrack)
| No. | Title | Length |
|---|---|---|
| 1. | "Trish in Training" | 1:41 |
| 2. | "Malcolm the Hacker" | 2:15 |
| 3. | "Trish Trying on Costumes" | 1:55 |
| 4. | "Sallinger's Theme" | 2:59 |
| 5. | "Searching for Mona" | 2:50 |
| 6. | "I Just Want a Name" | 2:31 |
| 7. | "Snooping Around the Gallery" | 2:28 |
| 8. | "Jessica Spies Trish Stalking Brandt" | 2:53 |
| 9. | "Kith's Love Theme for Jeri" | 2:44 |
| 10. | "Jessica Trapped in the Tank" | 2:40 |
| 11. | "Finding Dorothy" | 4:33 |
| 12. | "Jessica and Erik" | 2:46 |
| 13. | "Hogarth's Press Conference" | 1:38 |
| 14. | "Zaya Reaching Out" | 1:49 |
| 15. | "Meeting on Sallinger's Turf" | 3:36 |
| 16. | "Erik Is Rescued" | 2:44 |
| 17. | "Trish Is Taken Down" | 4:06 |
| 18. | "Streetwise Sallinger" | 2:10 |
| 19. | "Arrested While Following Trish" | 4:50 |
| 20. | "Wrestling Match" | 2:49 |
| 21. | "Goodbyes at the Pier" | 1:53 |
| Total length: | | 57:51 |

== Release ==
The third and final season of Jessica Jones was released on Netflix worldwide on June 14, 2019. The season, along with the additional Jessica Jones seasons and the other Marvel Netflix series, was removed from Netflix on March 1, 2022, due to Netflix's license for the series ending and Disney regaining the rights. The season became available on Disney+ in the United States, Canada, United Kingdom, Ireland, Australia, and New Zealand on March 16, ahead of its debut in Disney+'s other markets by the end of 2022.

== Reception ==
=== Critical response ===
On review aggregator Rotten Tomatoes, the season has an approval rating of 73% with an average rating of 6.40/10, based on 40 reviews. The website's critical consensus states, "Even if it's not the most satisfying finale for an entire era of Marvel television, Jessica Jones' final chapter finishes strong by giving its complicated heroine the space to change—and Krysten Ritter one last chance to work her sarcastic magic." On Metacritic, it has a weighted average score of 64 out of 100, based on 6 critics, indicating "generally favorable" reviews.

=== Accolades ===
| Year | Award | Category | Nominee(s) | Result | Ref. |
|---|---|---|---|---|---|
| 2019 | Saturn Awards | Best Actress in a Streaming Presentation | Krysten Ritter | Nominated | |
| 2019 | Saturn Awards | Best Streaming Superhero Television Series | Jessica Jones | Nominated | |
