= List of Jessica Jones characters =

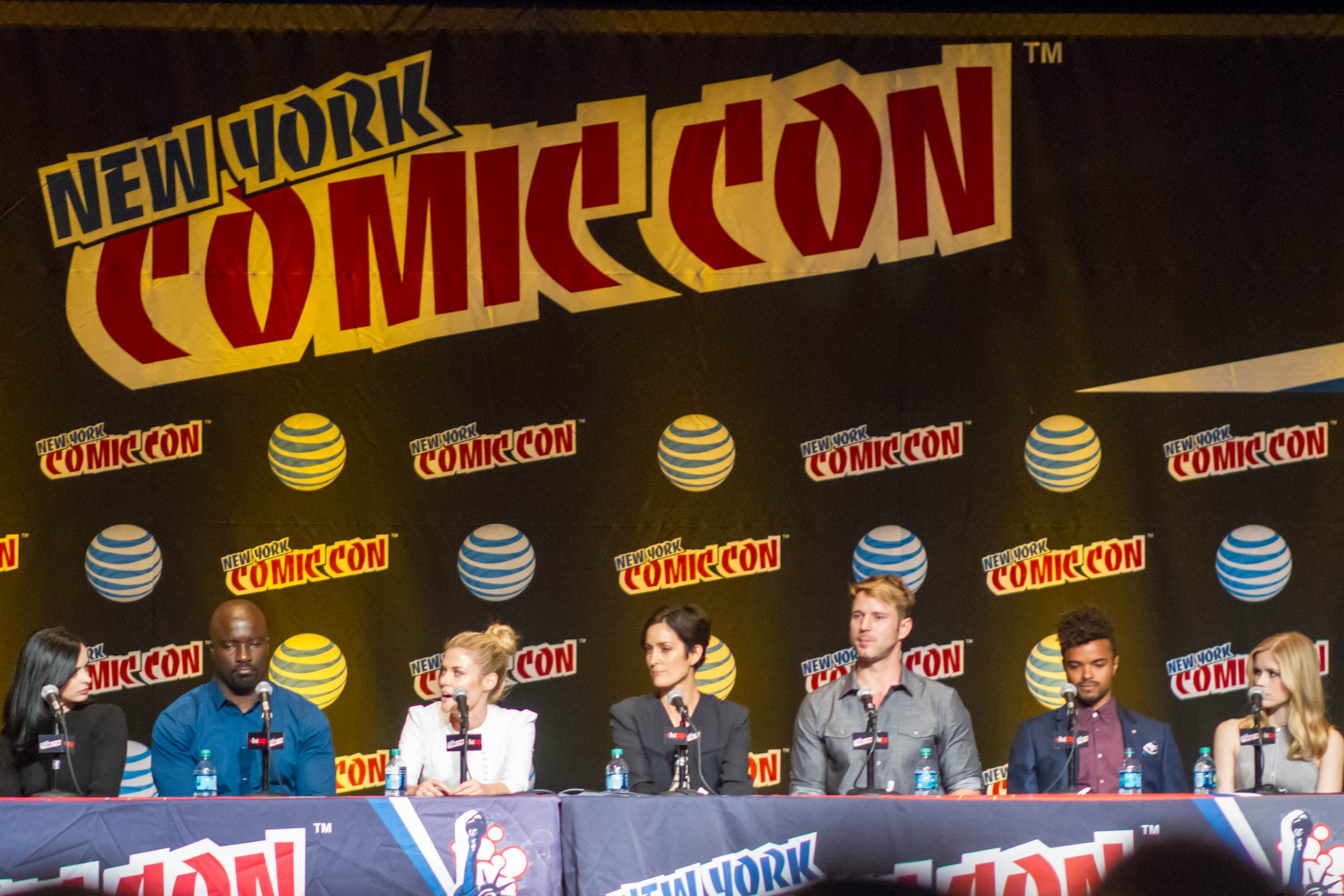
Main cast members (L-R) Ritter, Colter, Taylor, Moss, Traval, Darville, and Moriarty at the 2015 New York Comic Con.

Jessica Jones is an American streaming television series created for Netflix by Melissa Rosenberg, based on the Marvel Comics character of the same name. It is set in the Marvel Cinematic Universe (MCU), sharing continuity with the films of the franchise, and is the second in a series of shows that lead up to a Defenders crossover miniseries.

The series stars Krysten Ritter as Jessica Jones, with Rachael Taylor, Eka Darville, and Carrie-Anne Moss also starring. They were joined by Mike Colter, Wil Traval, Erin Moriarty, and David Tennant for the first season, J. R. Ramirez, Terry Chen, Leah Gibson and Janet McTeer for the second season, and Benjamin Walker, Sarita Choudhury, Jeremy Bobb and Tiffany Mack for the third season. In addition to original characters, several characters based on various Marvel properties also appear throughout the series.

Ritter and Colter reprise their roles in the Marvel Studios Disney+ series Daredevil: Born Again (2025–present).

== Overview ==
Character	Portrayed by	Appearances			
Character	Portrayed by	First	Season 1	Season 2	Season 3
Main characters
Jessica Jones	Krysten Ritter	"AKA Ladies Night"	Main	Main	Main
Luke Cage	Mike Colter	"AKA Ladies Night"	Main		Guest
Trish Walker Hellcat	Rachael Taylor	"AKA Ladies Night"	Main	Main	Main
Will Simpson	Wil Traval	"AKA It's Called Whiskey"	Main	Guest	
Hope Shlottman	Erin Moriarty	"AKA Ladies Night"	Main		
Malcolm Ducasse	Eka Darville	"AKA Ladies Night"	Main	Main	Main
Jeri Hogarth	Carrie-Anne Moss	"AKA Ladies Night"	Main	Main	Main
Kilgrave Kevin Thompson	David Tennant	"AKA Ladies Night"	Main	Guest	Guest
Oscar Arocho	J. R. Ramirez	"AKA Start at the Beginning"		Main	Guest
Pryce Cheng	Terry Chen	"AKA Start at the Beginning"		Main	
Inez Green	Leah Gibson	"AKA God Help the Hobo"		Main	
Alisa Jones	Miriam Shor	"AKA WWJD?"	Guest		
Alisa Jones	Janet McTeer	"AKA Sole Survivor"		Main	
Erik Gelden	Benjamin Walker	"AKA The Perfect Burger"			Main
Kith Lyonne	Sarita Choudhury	"AKA The Perfect Burger"			Main
Gregory Sallinger	Jeremy Bobb	"AKA The Perfect Burger"			Main
Zaya Okonjo	Tiffany Mack	"AKA The Perfect Burger"			Main
Recurring characters
Pam	Susie Abromeit	"AKA Ladies Night"	Recurring		
Wendy Ross-Hogarth	Robin Weigert	"AKA Ladies Night"	Recurring		
Nicole	Nichole Yannetty	"AKA Ladies Night"	Recurring	Guest	
Ruben	Kieran Mulcare	"AKA Crush Syndrome"	Recurring		
Oscar Clemons	Clarke Peters	"AKA Crush Syndrome"	Recurring		
Robyn	Colby Minifie	"AKA Crush Syndrome"	Recurring		
Clair	Danielle Ferland	"AKA 99 Friends"	Recurring		
Emma	Gillian Glasco	"AKA 99 Friends"	Recurring		
Jackson	Ryan Farrell	"AKA 99 Friends"	Recurring		
Donald	Paul Pryce	"AKA 99 Friends"	Recurring		
Louise Thompson	Lisa Emery	"AKA 99 Friends"	Recurring		
Dorothy Walker	Rebecca De Mornay	"AKA Top Shelf Perverts"	Guest	Recurring	Recurring
Albert Thompson	Michael Siberry	"AKA WWJD?"	Recurring		
Griffin Sinclair	Hal Ozsan	"AKA Start at the Beginning"		Recurring	
Steven Benowitz	Maury Ginsberg	"AKA Start at the Beginning"		Recurring	Guest
Vido Arocho	Kevin Chacon	"AKA Start at the Beginning"		Recurring	Guest
Eddy Costa	John Ventimiglia	"AKA Freak Accident"		Recurring	Recurring
Ruth Sunday	Lisa Tharps	"AKA Freak Accident"		Recurring	
Karl Malus	Callum Keith Rennie	"AKA The Octopus"		Recurring	
Shane Ryback	Eden Marryshow	"AKA Ain't We Got Fun"		Recurring	
Char	Rachel McKeon	"AKA Playland"		Guest	Recurring
Gillian	Aneesh Sheth	"AKA The Perfect Burger"			Recurring
Grace	Jessica Frances Dukes	"AKA The Perfect Burger"			Recurring
Brianna Gelden	Jamie Neumann	"AKA I Wish"			Recurring

== Main characters ==
=== Jessica Jones ===
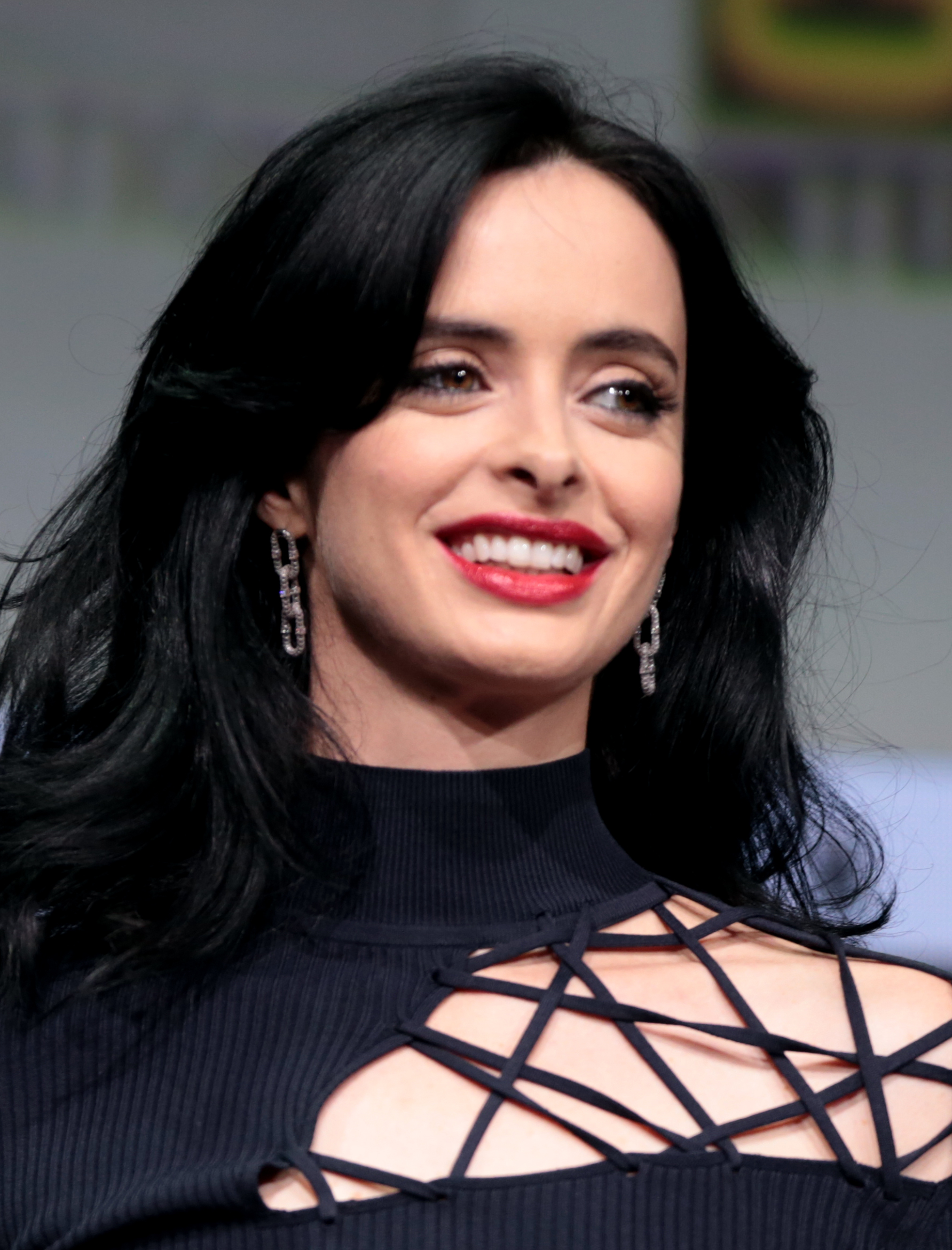
Krysten Ritter

Jessica Jones (portrayed by Krysten Ritter) is a former superhero with the abilities of superhuman strength and flight, suffering from post-traumatic stress disorder after Kilgrave enslaved her for eight months and made her kill Luke Cage's wife, Reva Connors; after Jones gives up the superhero life, she opens her own detective agency, Alias Investigations.

By November 2014, Ritter, Alexandra Daddario, Teresa Palmer, Jessica De Gouw and Marin Ireland were being tested for the role of Jessica Jones, with Ritter having been auditioning since October and on the top of executive producer and showrunner Melissa Rosenberg's list for playing Jones, even when Rosenberg was earlier developing the series for ABC. The next month, Ritter was cast in the role. Ritter and Palmer had been the final candidates, with both auditioning opposite Mike Colter to test chemistry. Ritter stated that she read through Alias in preparation for the role and expressed delight in working with Rosenberg. On adapting the character from the comics, Jeph Loeb stated, "Jessica Jones [i]s based on a much more adult comic. The source material came that way. She has real problems with a number of things that she abuses! And we're not shying away from that. There's no tidying her up." Ritter called playing the character the "biggest acting challenge" in her career and praised the character development. She explained that when she was playing the character, she took "a lot from the comics because she's so well-drawn. We have some lines that are pulled from the comics, but then the script—she's as developed for television as she is in the comics". Ritter put on 10 pounds (4.5 kg) of muscle for the role and trained for two months before filming began. Elizabeth Cappuccino portrayed a young Jessica.

Series costume designer Stephanie Maslansky was assisted on the first episode by Jenn Rogien, who crafted Jessica Jones' leather jacket, faded jeans, and boots costume. On Jessica's costume, Maslansky said she "considers her clothing to be an armor and a shield and something that helps her maintain a distance from other people and privacy. It keeps her from having to deal with the rest of humanity in a certain sort of way." At least 10 versions of Jessica's jacket were made, which started as an Acne Studios leather motorcycle jacket that had any "bells and whistles and any additional superfluous design details" removed, while 20 pairs of jeans were used, with both being aged and distressed.

Ritter described the character by saying that "she goes about things in a very odd way, she's very rough around the edges, and dry and sarcastic and a total asshole sometimes. But I think at her core she's a good person." Comparing the character to Matt Murdock in Marvel's Daredevil, Rosenberg said, "They're very different kinds of characters. Jessica is about paying rent and getting the next client. She's dealing with a fairly dark past. She's trying to get through the day. She's not really trying to save the city. She's trying to save her apartment. At her core, she does share something with Matt Murdock, and he's a little more aware of it, that she wants to do something good. She wants to contribute to the world. But, there are a lot of personality issues for her that can get in the way. ... Matt Murdock has been studying martial arts. He has extraordinary fighting skills. Jessica Jones is a brawler. She gets drunk, she gets pissed off and boom, you're down. She doesn't wear a costume. She doesn't have a mask. She's just who she is. She's an extremely blunt, direct person, and that applies to the action, as well."

Ritter was nominated for the 6th Critics' Choice Television Awards' Best Actress in a Drama Series for her role as Jones.

Ritter reprised the role in the second and third seasons of the Marvel Studios Disney+ series Daredevil: Born Again (2026–27).

=== Luke Cage ===
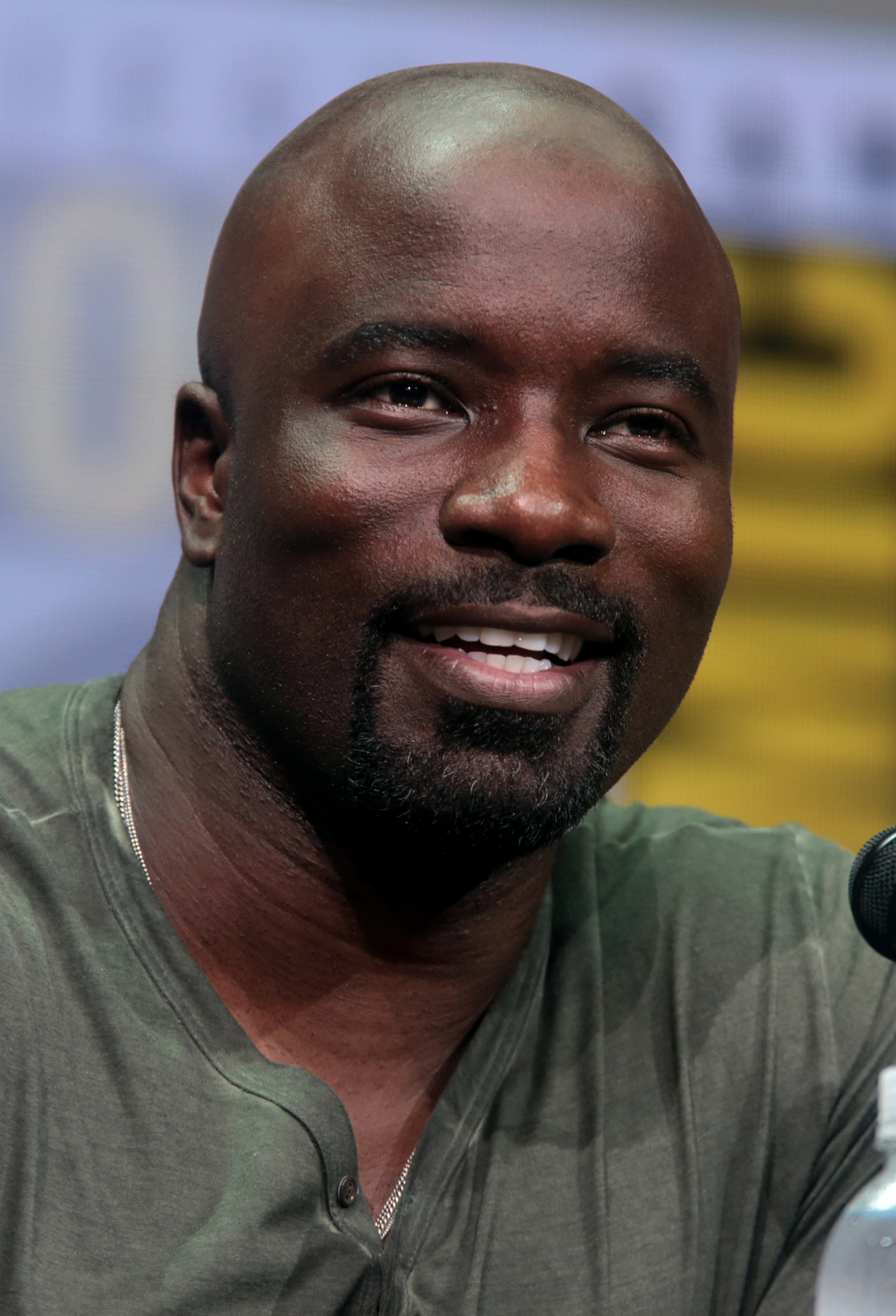
Mike Colter

Luke Cage (portrayed by Mike Colter) is a man with superhuman strength and unbreakable skin, with a mysterious past that Jones encounters in the course of an investigation and who changes her life immensely.

In November 2014, Lance Gross, Colter, and Cleo Anthony were in contention for the role of Luke Cage, which was envisioned as a recurring role in the series before headlining Marvel's Luke Cage. Colter was confirmed in the role the next month, having signed on for the series, and others, without reading any scripts, and being drawn to the series because of its opportunity to have character exploration, which he felt was lacking in the MCU films. He put on 30 pounds (14 kg) of muscle for the role. Rosenberg noted that because Cage has his own series to explore who he is, she represents him as "a man of few words" rather than trying to say anything about who he is in particular. Colter was pleased and surprised that the audience "got" the character, as Luke "was a man of few words and a lot of subtext," which "was refreshing because we were going for this character in a way that said little but spoke volumes because of their past history together. I felt people got the subtleties." When Loeb described the character to Colter, he said "that Luke doesn't have to try hard at anything. It just happens." This helped Colter form the character, along with using his opposite personal experience of having to work hard for everything. Colter also credited Rosenberg and S. J. Clarkson with helping him "get on the right track" with the character in the early episodes. Maslansky felt that Cage was also someone "who wears his clothing like an armor," with his wardrobe consisting of T-shirts, jeans, leather jackets or an army jacket.

Colter described the character as "a neighborhood hero, very much linked to New York and Jessica Jones. [He] is a darker, grittier, more tangible character than Iron Man or Thor. He likes to keep things close to his chest, operate on the hush-hush. He has these abilities but he's not sure how and when to use them." Loeb said the character "is important to the show, and he is certainly important to the story of Jessica Jones and who she is. It would not be Jessica Jones unless you at least understood how Luke affected her life and where she is." He also added that the series sees Luke Cage "not quite in the middle, but in the early part of the middle" of his story, and that Luke Cage allows Marvel to "tell a great deal of story that happens before, and a great deal of story that happens afterwards."

Colter reprised the role in the second season finale of Daredevil: Born Again (2026), and is set to return in its third season (2027).

=== Trish Walker / Hellcat ===
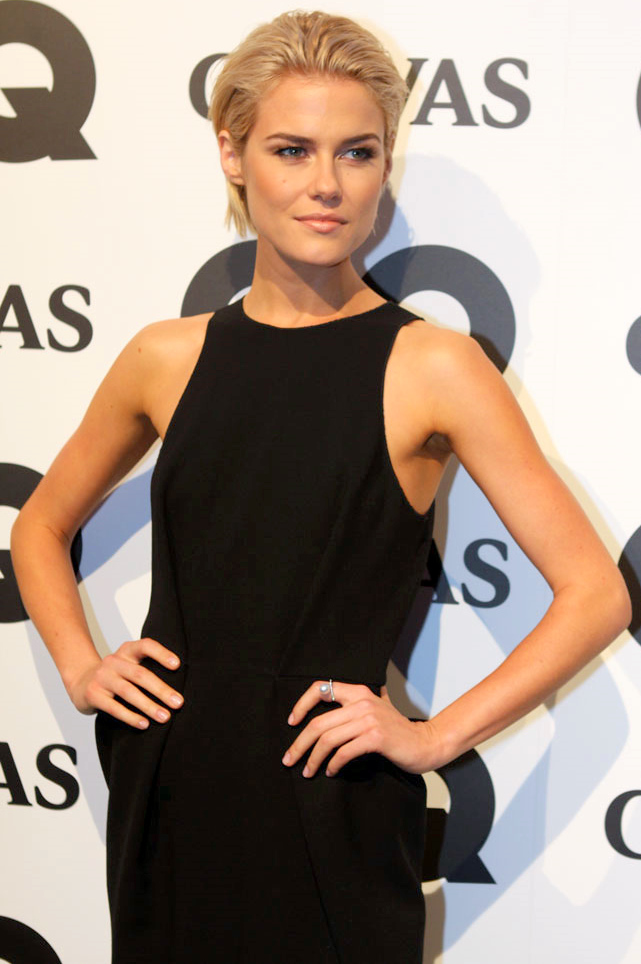
Rachael Taylor

Patricia "Trish" Walker (portrayed by Rachael Taylor) is a former model and child star known as "Patsy" who is Jones' adoptive sister and best friend and now works as a radio host. Trish became envious of her sister having powers and putting them to waste. Following Simpson's death, she began using his Combat Enhancer Inhaler to avoid feeling powerless. When the inhaler stopped working, she turned to Karl Malus, the man who had given her sister powers in the first place. Trish is depicted as the main antagonist of the third season of Jessica Jones as the vigilante serial killer "Hellcat".Following Trish's arrest, she was sentenced to the Raft.

Taylor was cast in January 2015. The role of Jones' best friend was intended for the character of Carol Danvers when Rosenberg was developing the series at ABC, but was changed to Walker due to the changing nature of the MCU and that Danvers would appear in her own film. Rosenberg ultimately found this to be "much more appropriate...it was better that [Jessica's] best friend was not someone with powers. It actually ends up being a really great mirror for her." Speaking about the character, Loeb said, "what's most important is the relationship between her and Jessica, and how these two women who are, in some ways, sisters, in terms of their friendship, could be that different, and yet believe in the same kinds of things. That question of, what is it to be a hero and the responsibilities that you have when you have abilities, is something that brings them together, but also continually pushes them apart. I think we're very lucky to have Melissa as a writer because she really grasps the insight of what it is to have a friendship with a woman, and the way that two women can actually be competitive and friendly, and love each other and hate each other, and have a history with each other." Taylor added that Jessica "was the first person to not care about the exterior parts of Patsy Walker or Trish Walker. She was the first person to see her for who she really was". Catherine Blades portrayed a young Trish.

To prepare for the role, Taylor "looked into a bunch of child stars" and determined "that the main source of [their] damage comes from feeling that they're loved for what they do and not who they are. The maternal/paternal or familial love or any kind of love is dependent on them being successful, making money, being sparkly, being famous, whatever the thing is." On the multiple alias Trish wields in the series, Taylor said, "Trish has a number of them. I think there is a part of her that is alpha that actually, if she had the kind of abilities that Jessica had, she would probably be President of the United States in that world or the equivalent. She would take it as far as she could because she has that in her."

=== Will Simpson ===
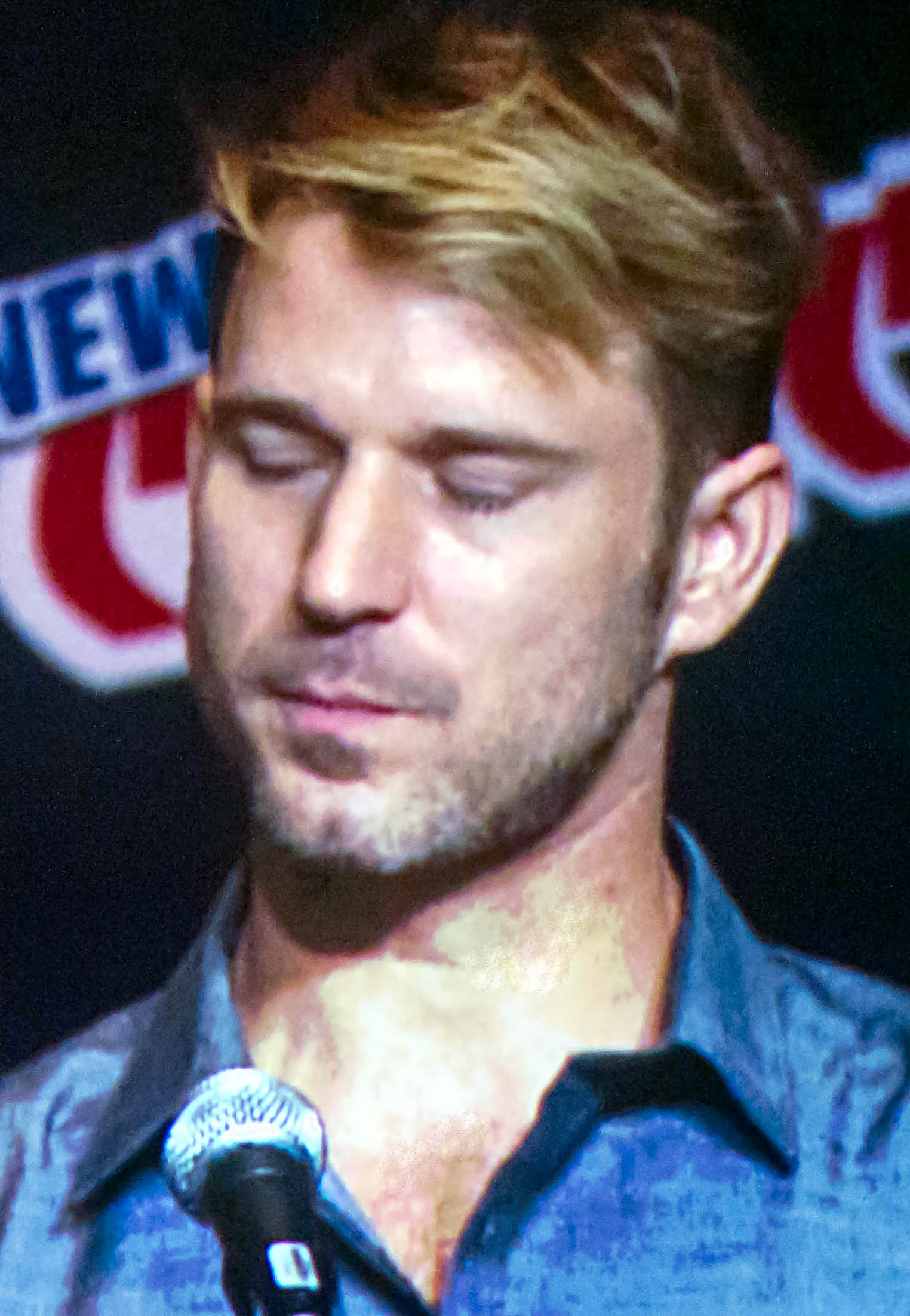
Wil Traval

Will Simpson (portrayed by Wil Traval) is an NYPD sergeant who is very serious about his job and being Trish Walker's love interest. He was later killed by Alisa Jones.

Traval joined the cast in February 2015. He felt that Simpson sees everything in "black and white" and that "justice can be served easily," an opposite to Jessica, who "deals in a world of gray" that causes the two to have friction between them. Traval described the character as "reinvented" and "reshaped" for the series from the one in the comics, where the character is known as Frank Simpson, as the comic character was "a little bit too hard to handle. [H]e was just a psychotic crazy guy."

=== Hope Shlottman ===
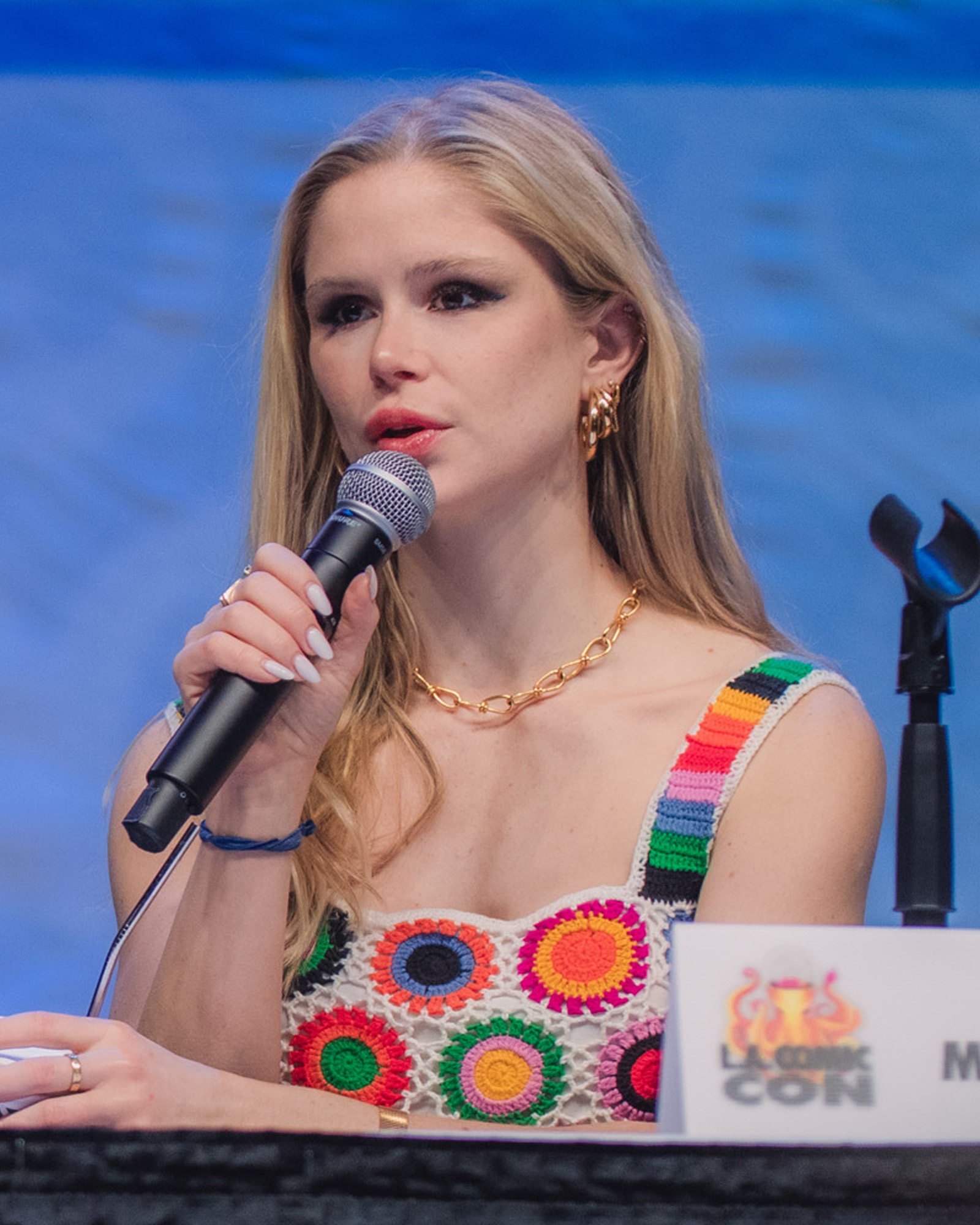
Erin Moriarty

Hope Shlottman (portrayed by Erin Moriarty) is a student-athlete attending New York University who is a client of Alias Investigations, upon her parents hiring Jessica to find their missing daughter. Later made to murder her parents by Kilgrave, proving her innocence becomes Jessica's objective for much of the first season; during this time, Hope discovers that she was impregnated by Kilgrave during her time as his slave, whereupon she has the fetus aborted. Exhausted by the ordeal and feeling that Jessica's drive to help her has caused more lives to be destroyed by Kilgrave, she takes her own life willingly to ensure that Jessica has nothing standing in her way of stopping Kilgrave permanently.

Moriarty joined the cast in February 2015. She called her character a "polar opposite" to Jessica Jones, describing Hope as "an all-American girl, [innocent and] really earnest". Over the course of the series, the two form a bond, with Jessica becoming protective of Hope, due to a shared experience they have with Kilgrave.

=== Malcolm Ducasse ===
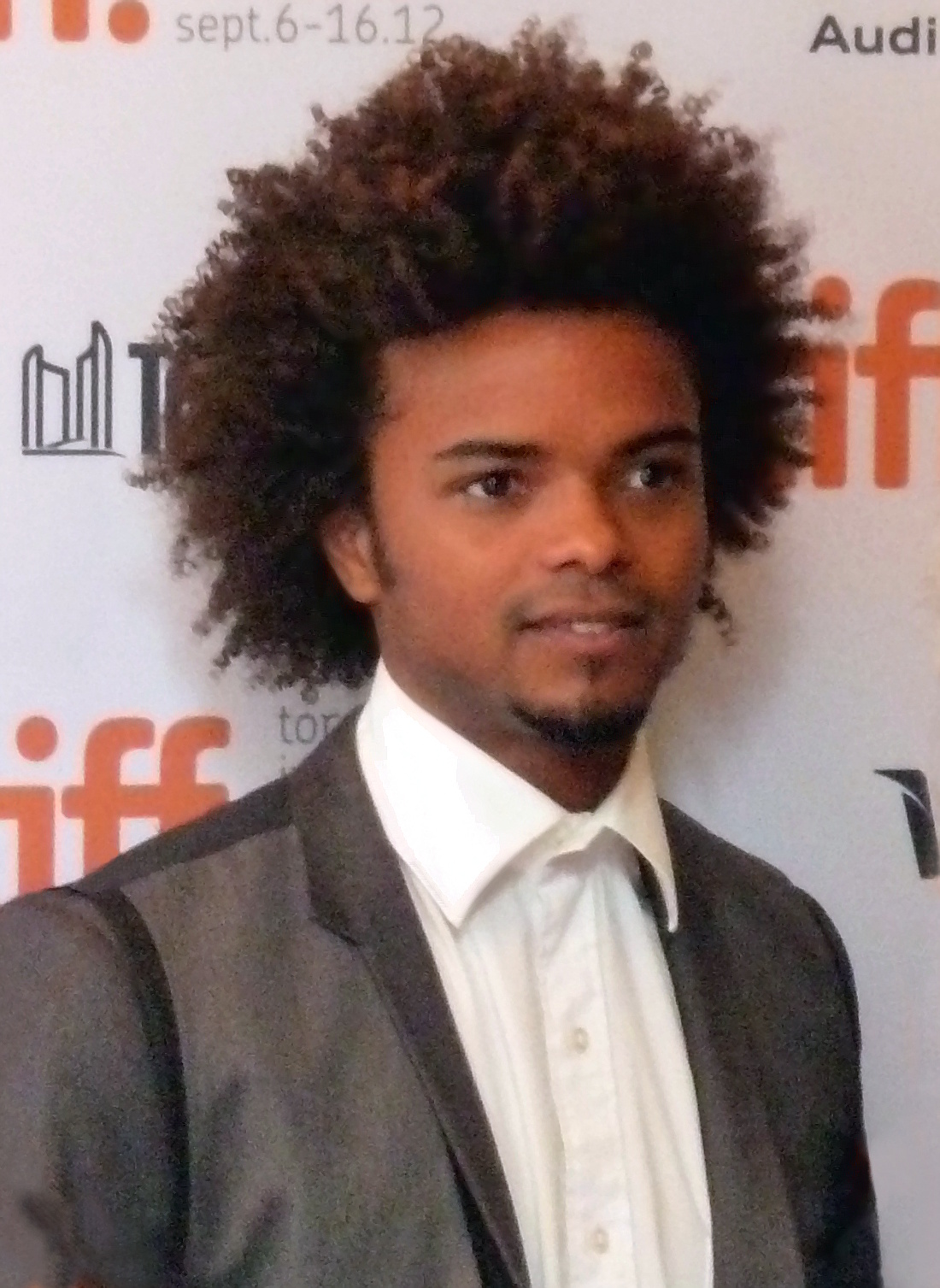
Eka Darville

Malcolm Ducasse (portrayed by Eka Darville) is Jones' neighbor who struggles with drug addiction, resulting in his personal journey intertwining with hers. He was addicted to drugs under Kilgrave's control, and Jones helped him overcome his addiction. He then partnered with her at Alias Investigations. Malcolm was investigating IGH, a shady company linked to Jones's superpowers, and was also recruited by Jeri Hogarth to uncover compromising information about her associates. His problems with Jones led him to leave Alias Investigations and join Hogarth's new firm, Hogarth & Associates. Malcolm began a relationship with his colleague Zaya Okonjo, but became distressed by the firm's practices. He was called upon by Jones once again to help protect Brianna Gelden, who was at risk from serial killer Gregory Sallinger. He then became involved again with Trish Walker, who had become a vigilante with superpowers, though his relationship with her cost him his relationship with Okonjo. Finally, Malcolm rejoined Alias Investigations, working with Jones to stop Walker, who had become a killer. After Walker's arrest, Malcolm received the keys to Alias from Jones, warning him not to ruin everything.

Darville joined the cast in February 2015. He stated that Malcolm was a new character for the series, though inspired by "seed characters" from the comics. He also felt playing the character with the drug addiction "was pretty intense and dark" and that Malcolm's relationship with Jessica "is like a flip-flop between victim and savior... much more [sibling-like] than anything else."

=== Jeri Hogarth ===
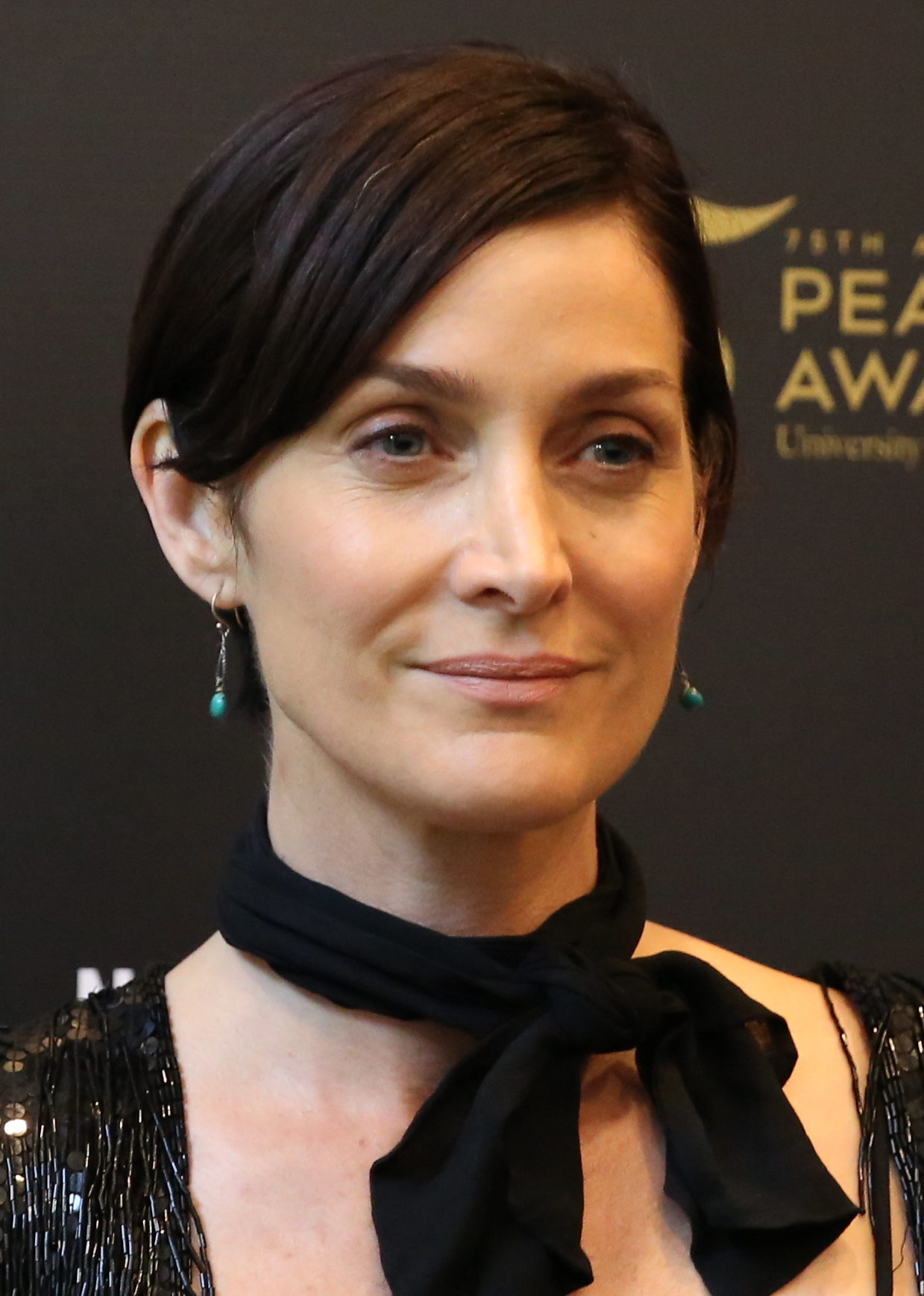
Carrie-Anne Moss

Jeryn "Jeri" Hogarth (portrayed by Carrie-Anne Moss) is an attorney and potentially powerful ally to Jones, who hires Jones for cases.

Moss was announced as cast in early February 2015, with her character revealed in October to be a gender-swapped (changed from male to female) version of the comics character Jeryn Hogarth. The character was also made a lesbian. Moss signed on to the series after reading the first two scripts, having been pitched the character by Loeb and Rosenberg. Moss described the character by saying that "she's fierce, she's strong, she's powerful, and she likes that power." She worked "a few days every episode", which allowed her to grow the character throughout the series, while not knowing what the character would become as she played each moment, which she noted was how real-life is.

Moss reprised her role in the second season of Daredevil, in Iron Fist, and The Defenders. Comparing those experiences to her much larger role on Jessica Jones, Moss said, "You want to come in and have something powerful. For Jessica Jones, that's where I get to have that experience. With the other shows, I'm having fun."

=== Kevin Thompson / Kilgrave ===
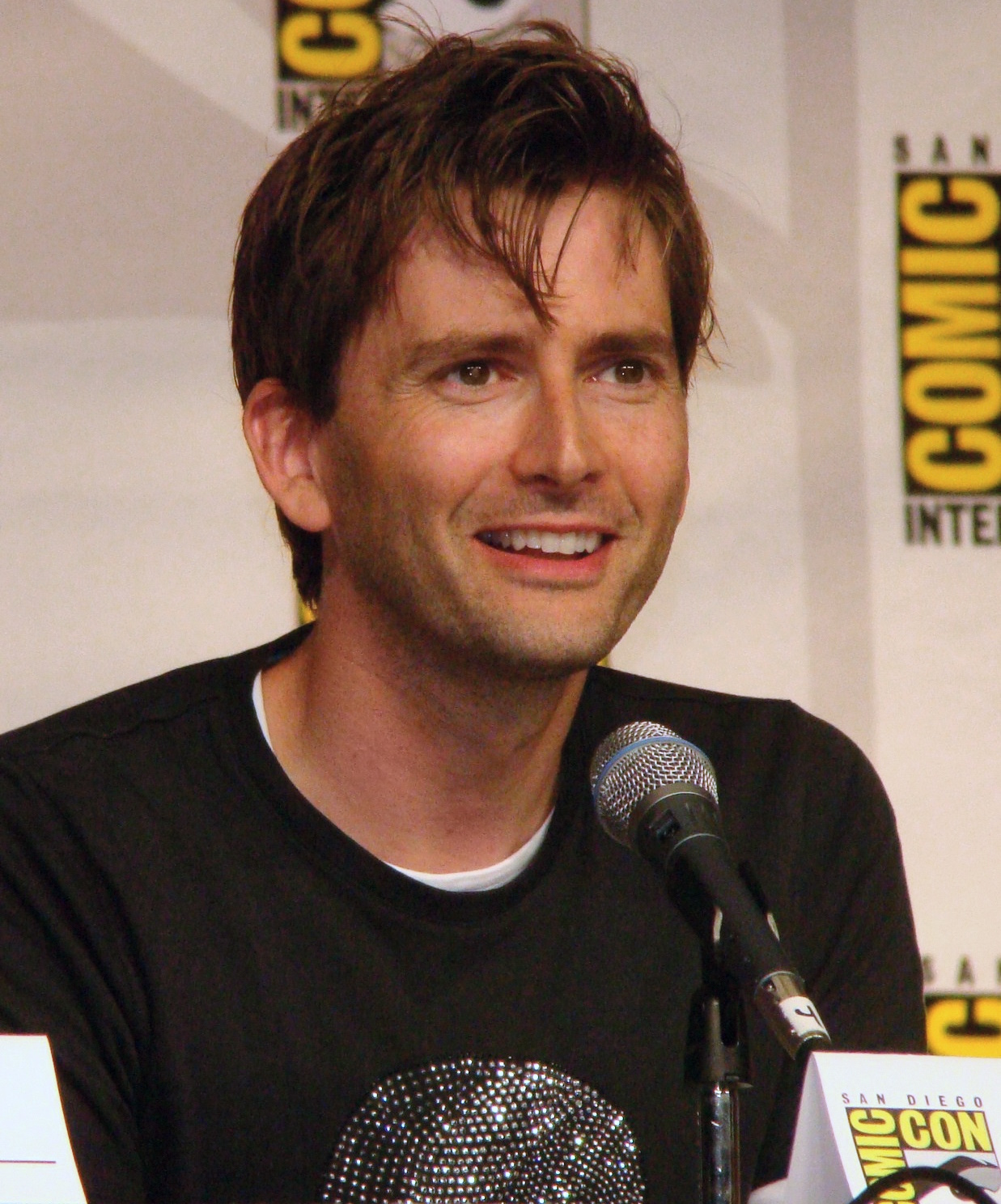
David Tennant

Kevin "Kilgrave" Thompson (portrayed by David Tennant) is a mysterious man from Jones's past who can control minds and whose reappearance shakes up her life. He was born with a neural disease and experimented on as a young child, which resulted in his acquiring an airborne virus that gave him his powers. He later changed his name to Kilgrave. He was later killed by Jones.

Rosenberg stated that Tennant was the choice for the character when the series was originally developed for ABC, but he was unavailable at that time, so the production made sure to "jump on him" when the series moved to Netflix. To pitch Tennant on this version of the series, Rosenberg and Loeb spoke with him and gave him the scripts for the first two episodes (in which Kilgrave does not appear much) and drafts of some scenes from later in the series, including of the flashback where Kilgrave and Jones first meet. Tennant was cast in January 2015. Maslansky, who had originally planned to custom-make Kilgrave's wardrobe, used many suits created by designer Paul Smith from the previous fashion season for him since Smith "was all about purple." On his outfits, Maslansky added the designers "wanted to find a place where we could utilize clothing in shades of purple, but not go so over the top that it would look silly and that he would stop feeling ominous or menacing." James Freedson-Jackson portrayed a young Kilgrave.

Tennant stated, "Kilgrave is the classic character who is abused and therefore perpetuates abuse. It was just a terrible, horrible cycle." Loeb called Kilgrave "a terrible man who doesn't see himself as terrible" and compared him to Vincent D'Onofrio's Wilson Fisk in Daredevil, saying, "There are going to be times [watching Daredevil] when you're uncomfortable because you're not quite rooting for Matt, you're kind of rooting for Wilson, and it's the same kind of thing you're going to find in Jessica. There's going to be moments where some of the things that she does [are] pretty questionable. And some of the things that, when you learn about Kilgrave's character and the way that David Tennant plays that character, it's really extraordinary." Tennant noted that at first the idea of mind control seems "quite a rather splashy, kind of comic book idea" but that in reality, "the idea that everyone should bend to your every whim and that no one should ever contradict you, that you can have whatever you want whenever you wanted it....it's rather aspirational and rather desirable at first glance, but the fact of it is then rather horrifying, because you could never have a genuine human relationship with anyone...that starts touching on what kind of personality that would create, what kind of person that would make you, how that would pollute your worldview."

=== Oscar Arocho ===
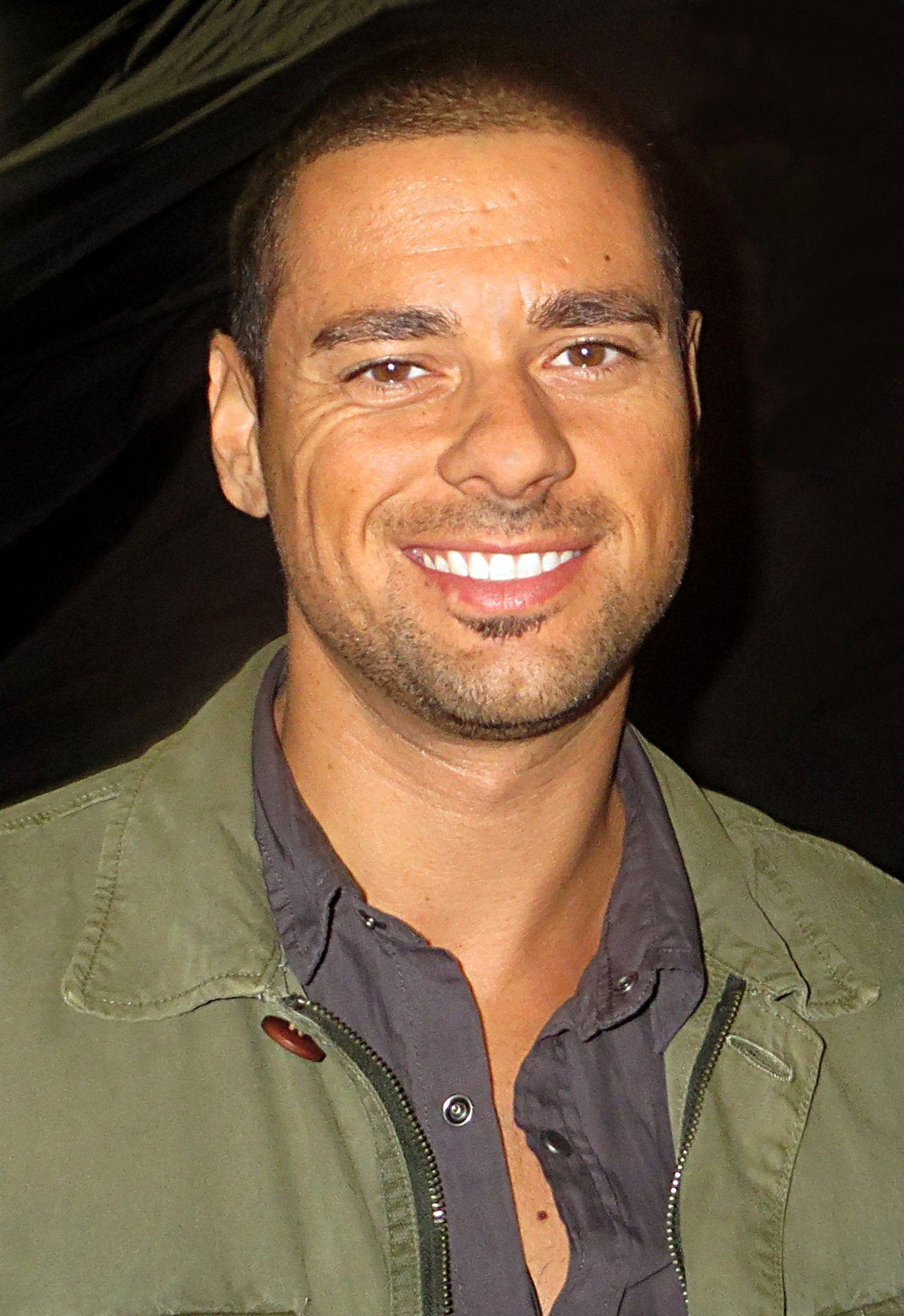
JR Ramirez

Oscar Arocho (portrayed by J. R. Ramirez) is the new building superintendent in Jones' building, and a single father whose son becomes enamored with Jones and her powers.

Ramirez was cast in March 2017, which was revealed that July after the airing of his character's death on Power.

=== Pryce Cheng ===
Pryce Cheng (portrayed by Terry Chen) is a rival private investigator to Jones. He's the director of Cheng Consulting Management, a private investigation firm. Cheng contacted Jones with the intention of acquiring Alias Investigations and hiring her to handle cases involving people with superhuman abilities, but Jones's refusal created a rift between them. However, Cheng was approached by Malcolm Ducasse, who quit Alias Investigations, and gave him the job and they joined Hogarth & Associates in a meeting to become partners.

=== Inez Green ===
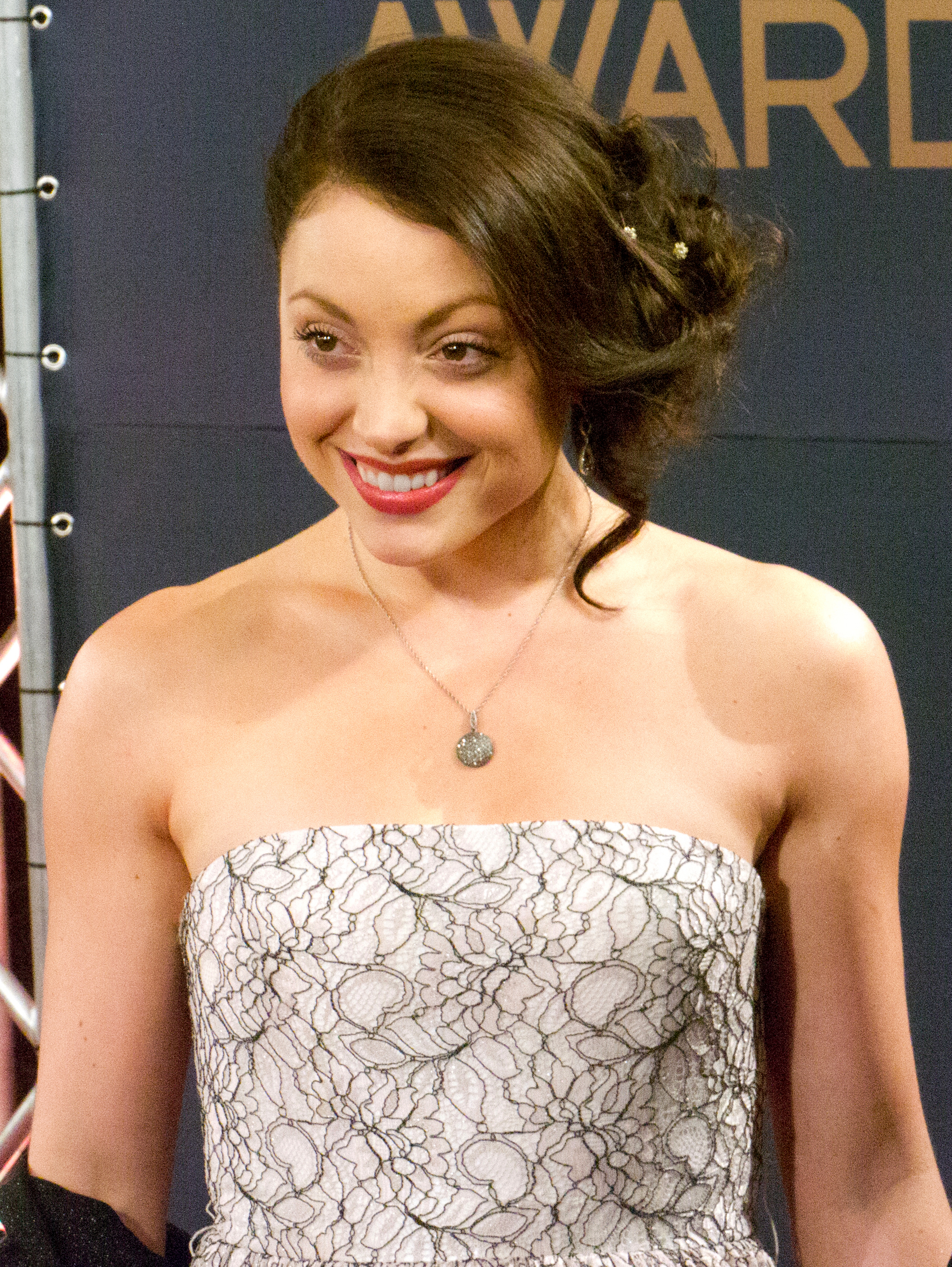
Leah Gibson

Inez Green (portrayed by Leah Gibson) is a "street-wise" nurse, who worked for IGH before being attacked by Alisa Jones and developing psychological problems.She later met Jeri Hogarth and the two developed feelings. However, Green had other motives and tricked Hogarth into getting her friend, Shane Ryback, out of prison by making Hogarth believe Ryback had powers that could heal Hogarth's ALS. Once Ryback was out, Green and him robbed Hogarth and left to live together. Green soon found Hogarth again, who tricked her into killing Ryback, thus completing her revenge.

Gibson was cast as Inez by July 2017.

=== Alisa Jones ===
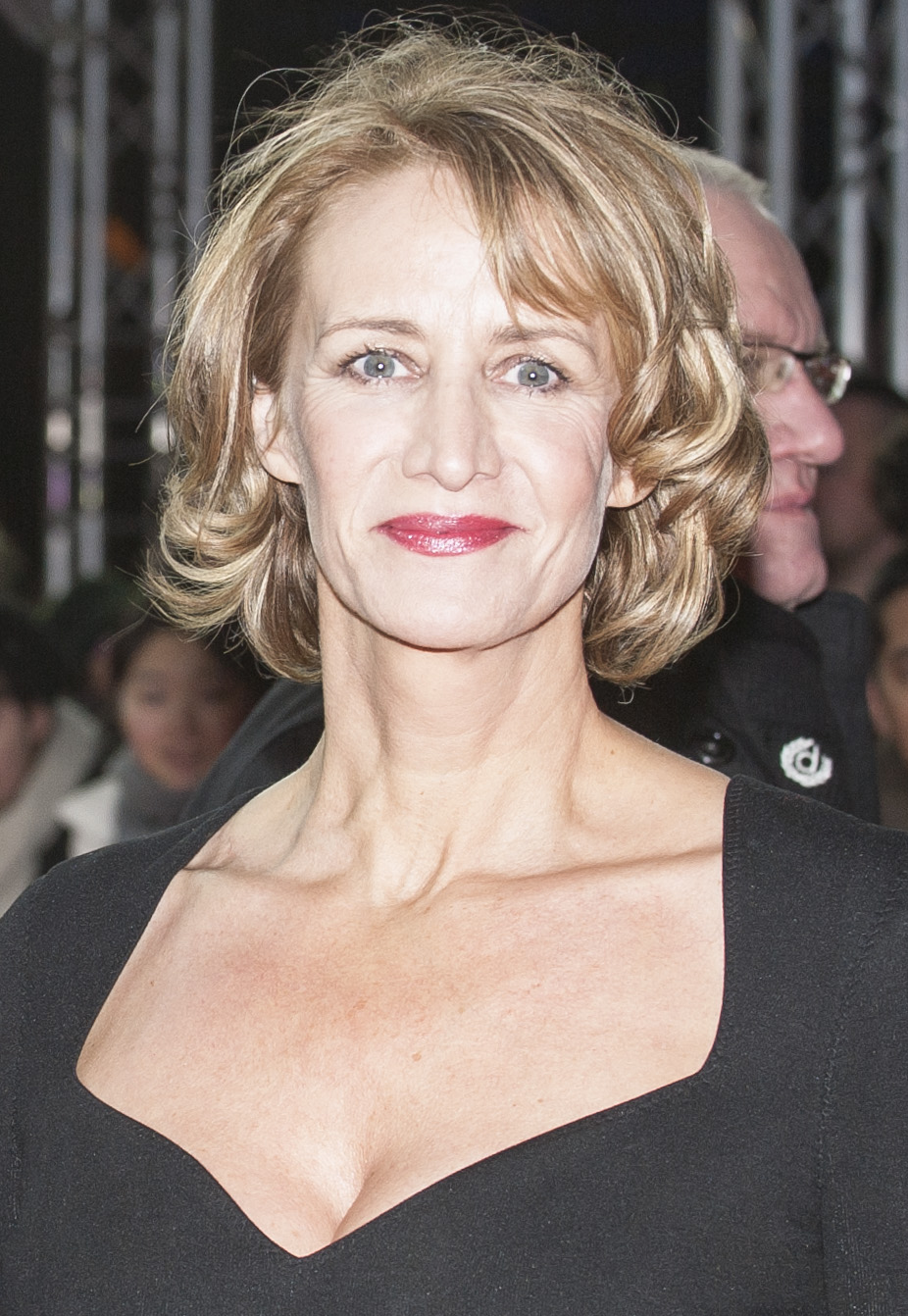
Janet McTeer

Alisa Jones (portrayed by Miriam Shor in season one, Janet McTeer in season two) is Jessica's mother who was seemingly killed in a car crash when she was young. It was later revealed that Karl Malus of IGH saved her life and has been going around targeting anyone involved with IGH. Alisa was later killed by Trish while she was on the ferris wheel with Jessica. Detective Costa gave Jessica the credit of putting her mother out of her misery.

=== Erik Gelden ===
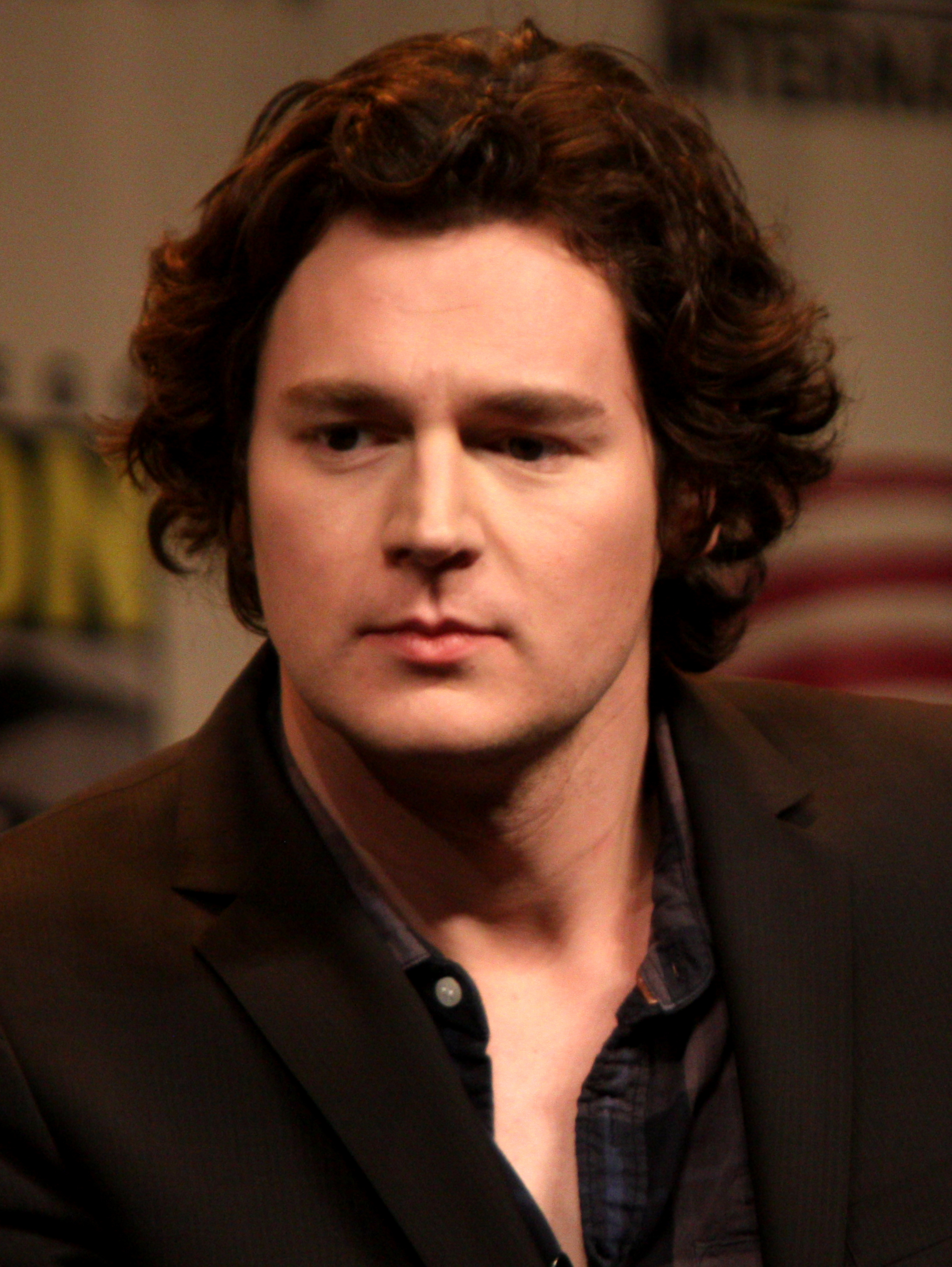
Benjamin Walker

Erik Gelden (portrayed by Benjamin Walker) is a gambler with empathic super abilities. He blackmailed other individuals with his powers until he crossed paths with Gregory Sallinger. Erik becomes Jessica's newest love interest and ally, in locating and imprisoning Sallinger, who was later threatened by Trish Walker, who lost control and became a killer. Erik helped Jessica find Trish so she could be imprisoned at The Raft prison. Erik was urged by Jessica to partner with Detective Eddy Costa to investigate and capture the criminals.

=== Kith Lyonne ===
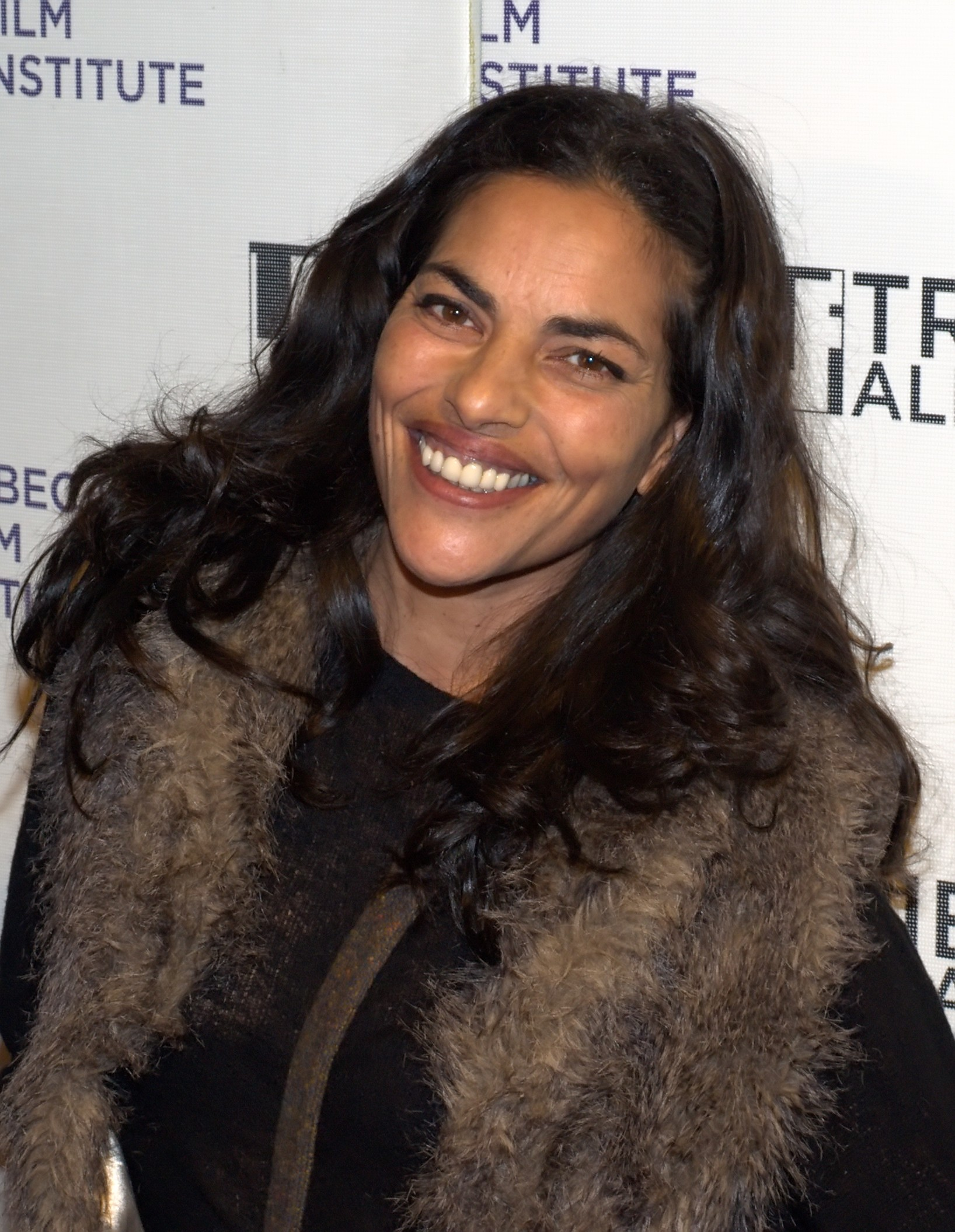
Sarita Choudhury

Kith Lyonne (portrayed by Sarita Choudhury) is married to law professor Peter Lyonne and the former flame of Jeri Hogarth. Due to her husband's death, and Trish Walker's threats, Kith says goodbye to Jeri, knowing that they will never see each other again.

=== Gregory Sallinger ===
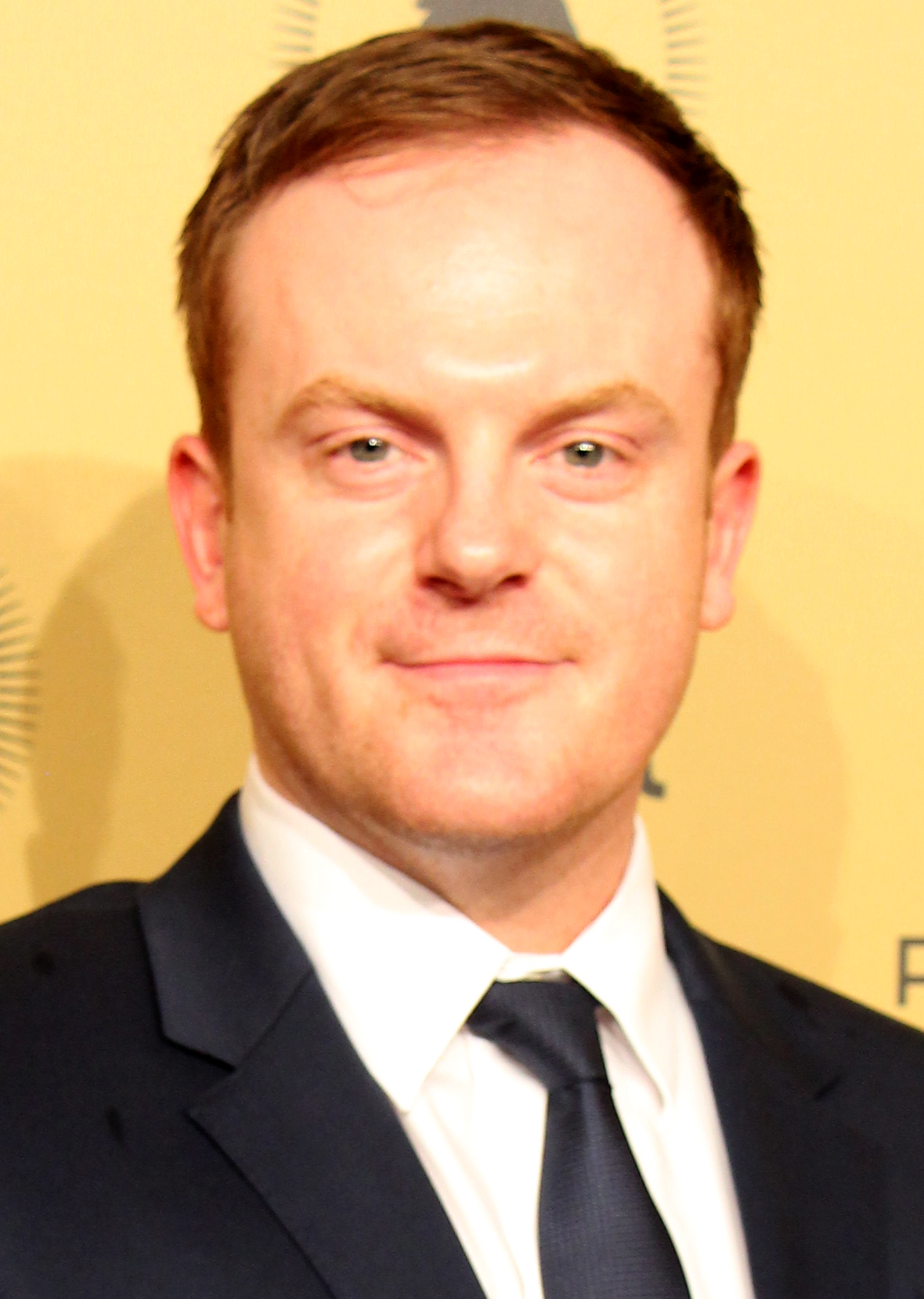
Jeremy Bobb

Gregory Sallinger (portrayed by Jeremy Bobb) is a psychotic killer with high intelligence and an unusual obsession with wanting to kill Jessica and other powered beings. Sallinger was later killed by Trish while he was about to be sentenced in prison for Dorothy's murder.

=== Zaya Okonjo ===
Zaya Okonjo (portrayed by Tiffany Mack) is an employee of Hogarth's and Malcolm's new girlfriend. However, her relationship with him did not last long because of his secret with Trish Walker, who had become a vigilante with superpowers, known as the masked vigilante.

== Recurring characters ==
=== Introduced in season one ===
==== Pam ====
Pam (portrayed by Susie Abromeit) is Jeri Hogarth's assistant and lover.She is later mind-controlled to kill herself by Kilgrave.

Abromeit worked with her manager, who is gay, to portray Pam as a lesbian, and created her own backstory for the character. This included childhood trauma and Pam's realization during college that she is attracted to women.

==== Wendy Ross-Hogarth ====
Wendy Ross-Hogarth (portrayed by Robin Weigert) is a doctor and Jeri Hogarth's wife, whom Hogarth is divorcing.She is mind-controlled by Kilgrave to kill Hogarth and is attacked and killed herself by Pam.

==== Nicole ====
Nicole (portrayed by Nichole Yannetty) is an intern on Trish Walker's talk show.

==== Ruben ====
Ruben (portrayed by Kieran Mulcare) is Jones' upstairs neighbor and the twin brother of Robyn. He is later mind-controlled to kill himself by Kilgrave.

==== Oscar Clemons ====
Oscar Clemons (portrayed by Clarke Peters) is an NYPD detective at the 15th Precinct. He is later killed by Will Simpson to keep him from getting the police involved in the search for Kilgrave.

==== Robyn ====
Robyn (portrayed by Colby Minifie) is Jones' upstairs neighbor and the twin sister of Ruben.

==== Clair ====
Clair (portrayed by Danielle Ferland) is a cellist and a victim of Kilgrave who becomes a member of a support group established by Jones.

==== Emma ====
Emma (portrayed by Gillian Glasco) is an actress and a victim of Kilgrave who becomes a member of a support group established by Jones.

==== Jackson ====
Jackson (portrayed by Ryan Farrell) is a victim of Kilgrave who becomes a member of a support group established by Jones.

==== Donald ====
Donald (portrayed by Paul Pryce) is a victim of Kilgrave who becomes a member of a support group established by Jones.

==== Louise Thompson ====
Louise Thompson (portrayed by Lisa Emery) is a scientist and Kilgrave's mother. She is later forced to commit suicide by Kilgrave.

==== Dorothy Walker ====
Dorothy Walker (portrayed by Rebecca De Mornay) is Trish Walker's abusive mother and talent agent who becomes Jessica's foster mother when she was young. She was later killed by Gregory Sallinger.

==== Albert Thompson ====
Albert Thompson (portrayed by Michael Siberry) is a scientist and Kilgrave's father. After Albert tried to amplify his son's powers, Jessica later found him dead.

=== Introduced in season two ===
==== Griffin Sinclair ====
Griffin Sinclair (portrayed by Hal Ozsan) is Trish's new boyfriend and a news anchor. When he proposed to her, he asked Trish if "thank you" meant "yes". She told him she was not sure, and decided to break up with him instead. Sometime after breaking up with Trish, Griffin returned to his job as a field reporter, and covered the Syrian Civil War.

==== Steven Benowitz ====
Steven Benowitz (portrayed by Maury Ginsberg) is one of the lead attorneys of Hogarth Chao & Benowitz.

==== Char ====
Char (portrayed by Rachel McKeon) is the professional, trusted assistant of Jeryn Hogarth at Hogarth & Associates.

==== Vido Arocho ====
Vido Arocho (portrayed by Kevin Chacon) is the son of Oscar Arocho who befriends Jessica.

==== Eddy Costa ====
Eddy Costa (portrayed by John Ventimiglia) is a detective investigating the deaths of anyone involved with IGH who has crossed paths with Jessica Jones, and he discovers that the murders were caused by Jones' own mother, Alisa Jones. Following the death of Alisa by Jones' hands, Costa continued working with her until they located Gregory Sallinger, who had attempted to assassinate Jones and was linked to several other murders in New York City. Costa helped Jones capture Sallinger, as well as Trish Walker after her killing spree. Jones then put Costa in touch with Erik Gelden to collaborate on fighting crime.

==== Ruth Sunday ====
Ruth Sunday (portrayed by Lisa Tharps) is Eddy Costa's detective partner. She was killed when Alisa fell out of the window with her.

==== Karl Malus ====
Karl Malus (portrayed by Callum Keith Rennie) is a scientist who is one of the leaders of IGH. He was the one who saved the lives of Jessica Jones and Alisa Jones following a car accident and later gave powers to Trish. He committed suicide by blowing up his lab.

==== Shane Ryback ====
Shane Ryback (portrayed by Eden Marryshow) is a con artist working with Inez Green. Ryback was freed by Jeri Hogarth with the promise that he would use his supposed powers to cure her of ALS, as his lover, Green, had swindled her. After running away with Green, Ryback was killed by her, as she believed he had been unfaithful, unaware that Hogarth had orchestrated the murder as revenge.

=== Introduced in season three ===
==== Gillian ====
Gillian (portrayed by Aneesh Sheth) is Jessica's newest assistant who is sarcastic and friendly. She is transgender.

==== Grace Bennett ====
Grace (portrayed by Jessica Frances Dukes) is Trish's co-host on Style with Trish.

==== Brianna Gelden ====
Brianna "Berry" Gelden (portrayed by Jamie Neumann) is the sister to Erik Gelden and a prostitute, who was in danger at the hands of serial killer Gregory Sallinger. Brianna becomes Malcolm's newest love interest, under his protection.

== Guest characters ==
The following is a supplementary list of recurring guest stars that appear in lesser roles or make significant cameo appearances. The characters are listed, in order of appearance on the show, by the other MCU media or season in which they first appeared.

=== Introduced in other TV series ===
- Brett Mahoney (portrayed by Royce Johnson; first appears in season one): A sergeant in the NYPD's 15th Precinct.
- Claire Temple (portrayed by Rosario Dawson; first appears in season one): A nurse in Hell's Kitchen.
- Franklin "Foggy" Nelson (portrayed by Elden Henson; first appears in season two): A lawyer at Hogarth, Chao & Benowitz.
- Turk Barrett (portrayed by Rob Morgan; first appears in season two): A common thug who specializes in guns.
- Thembi Wallace (portrayed by Tijuana Ricks; first appears in season two): A news reporter at WJBT News.

=== Introduced in season one ===
- Roy Healy (portrayed by Joseph Ragno): A bartender working for Cage.
- Reva Connors (portrayed by Parisa Fitz-Henley): Cage's wife, who was killed by Jones under Kilgrave's control
- Brian Jones (portrayed by James Colby): Jessica's father who was killed in a car crash when she was young.
- Phillip Jones (portrayed by Billy McFadden): Jessica's younger brother who was killed in a car crash when she was young. Based on the comic character "Phillip Campbell" who first appeared in Alias #22 (July 2003).
- Len Sirkes (portrayed by Brett Azar): A loan shark who Jessica and Cage encounter during a case. Based on the comic character "Lone Shark" who appeared in Marvel Assistant-Sized Spectacular #2 (June 2009).
- Miklos Kozlov (portrayed by Thomas Kopache): A doctor and member of IGH who ran the program that gave Simpson his experimental pills.
- Maury Tuttlebaum (portrayed by Daniel Marcus): A morgue attendant at Riverbank Medical Center.
- Samantha Reyes (portrayed by Michelle Hurd): A district attorney.

Stan Lee makes a cameo appearance through an on-set photograph, the same one seen in Daredevil. In Iron Fist, Lee's character is identified as NYPD Captain Irving Forbush.

=== Introduced in season two ===
- Linda Chao (portrayed by Angel Desai): Hogarth and Benowitz's partner at Hogarth, Chao & Benowitz.
- Zakarian (portrayed by Jacqueline Antaramian): Hogarth's doctor.
- Robert Coleman / Whizzer (portrayed by Jay Klaitz): A subject of IGH who possesses super speed.
- Ian (portrayed by Anthony Grasso): The head of Walker's radio station.
- Maximillian "Max" Tatum (portrayed by James McCaffrey): A film director with a terrible past with Walker.
- Maynard Tiboldt (portrayed by Ben Van Bergen): A hypnotherapist hired by Trish to evaluate Jessica.
- Sonia Arocho (portrayed by Victoria Cartagena): Oscar's ex-wife who resorts to kidnapping their son Vido.
- Stirling Adams (portrayed by Mat Vairo): A former bartender who briefly dates Jessica, but is killed by her mother.
- Ronald Garcia (portrayed by Alfredo Narciso): The head of the ZCN Broadcasting Center.
- Dale Holiday (portrayed by Brian Hutchinson): A sadistic prison guard and serial killer.
- Torres (portrayed by Myrna Cabello): A doctor that cares for Walker.

Lee once again makes a cameo appearance through an on-set photograph, on an advertisement for the law firm Forbush and Associates.

=== Introduced in season three ===
- Cassie Yasdan (portrayed by Rileigh Skye McDonald): A young girl who was taken to Mexico by her father. Jessica returned Cassie to her mother.
- Mitch Yasdan (portrayed by Greg Abbey): A man who took his daughter Cassie from her mother after not getting custody of her causing an amber alert.
- Cody Willamet (portrayed by Dante Costabile): A sports figure and client of Hogarth's who keeps getting out of trouble.
- Andrew Brandt (portrayed by Matt Weiss): A minor criminal sought after by Trish and Jessica.
- Adrian (portrayed by Blake Morris): Trish's personal trainer.
- Peter Lyonne (portrayed by John Benjamin Hickey): Kith Lyonne's law professor husband, who is in an open relationship. He committed suicide in his bathtub while uploading a video that gave a bad name to Hogarth & Associates.
- Sal Blaskowski (portrayed by Barbara Tirrell): A female bookie that Erik owed money to. She was accidentally wounded by a disguised Trish.
- Dwayne Blaskowski (portrayed by Airon Armstrong): Sal's son and enforcer.
- Gor (portrayed by Ivica Marc): Brianna Gelden's pimp.
- Laurent Lyonne (portrayed by Michael Hsu Rosen): Peter and Kith Lyonne's elder son
- Caspar Marx (portrayed by Curran Connor): A chef and one of Salinger's victims who survived his time with him.
- Ronnie Velasco (portrayed by Mary McCann): The police chief of Wappinger Falls who causes trouble for Jessica. When Jessica tipped over the Silva's gazebo and started punching the ground, Ronnie tried to stop her only for Trish to hold her back by threatening to upload her interference. When Jessica was done, Ronnie witnessed the unearthing of a body bag containing Nathan Silva's corpse.
- Ana Silva (portrayed by Mateo Gomez): The mother of Nathan Silva who resides in Wappinger Falls who was reluctant to tell Jessica about Gregory Sallinger's friendship her son. When Jessica unearthed the corpse of Nathan from underneath the Silva family's gazebo, Ana was devastated by her son's death.
- Manuel Silva (portrayed by Leticia Castillo): The father of Nathan Silva who resides in Wappinger Falls who informed Jessica about Gregory Sallinger's friendship his son. When Jessica unearthed the corpse of Nathan from underneath the Silva family's gazebo, Manuela was shocked that his son was killed and buried in his backyard.
- Russell Costa (portrayed by Paco Lozano): Eddy Costa's husband.
- Joby (portrayed by Scott Stangland): A decoy hired by Sallinger.
- Mona Lee (portrayed by Ellen Mah): A worker at GT Agrochemical that was Sallinger's possible target.
- Officer Carl Nussbaumer (portrayed by Larry Mitchell): A corrupt police officer who Erik Gelden threatened to expose.
- Detective Imada (portrayed by Tina Chilip): A detective who suspects that Jones murdered Nussbaumer.
- Detective Defford (portrayed by Anthoula Katsimatides): A detective who suspects that Jones murdered Nussbaumer.
- Jace Montero (portrayed by Chaske Spencer): A property developer who committed arson around the city.

== See also ==
- Daredevil cast and characters
- Luke Cage cast and characters
- Iron Fist cast and characters
- The Defenders cast and characters
