= The Surrogate (2020 film) =

2020 American LGBT-related independent drama film

- Film poster
- Directed by: Jeremy Hersh
- Written by: Jeremy Hersh
- Produced by: Jonathan Blitstein; Julie Christeas; Taylor Hess
- Starring: Jasmine Batchelor; Chris Perfetti; Sullivan Jones; Brooke Bloom; Eboni Booth; William DeMeritt
- Cinematography: Mia Cioffi Henry
- Edited by: Cecilia Delgado
- Production companies: Tandem Pictures; Resonant Pictures
- Distributed by: Monument Releasing
- Release date: June 12, 2020
- Running time: 93 minutes
- Country: United States
- Language: English

The Surrogate is a 2020 American LGBT-related independent drama film written and directed by Jeremy Hersh, in his feature film debut. The film stars Jasmine Batchelor, Chris Perfetti, Sullivan Jones, Brooke Bloom, Eboni Booth and William DeMeritt. The film premiered on June 12, 2020, in virtual cinemas, due to the COVID-19 pandemic, and received generally positive reviews. The film was released to streaming services on September 1, 2020.

== Plot ==
Jess agrees to be a surrogate mother for her best friend Josh and his husband Aaron. When a prenatal test reveals that the baby will likely be born with Down syndrome, complications arise between the three of them. Josh and Aaron are unsure if they are prepared to care for a special needs child, and the associated financial costs, so they suggest Jess have an abortion. Jess, on the other hand, has different plans, she researches what it will take to raise a special needs child by talking to knowledgeable mothers and looking into public assistance.

== Cast ==
- Jasmine Batchelor as Jess
- Chris Perfetti as Josh
- Sullivan Jones as Aaron
- Brooke Bloom as Bridget
- Eboni Booth as Samantha
- William DeMeritt as Pierre
- Purva Bedi as Diana
- Leon Addison Brown as Stephen Harris
- Tonya Pinkins as Karen Weatherston-Harris
- Brandon Micheal Hall as Nate
- Layla Khoshnoudi as Gertrude
- Jennifer Damiano as Rachel
- Catherine Curtin as Sarah

== Production notes ==
During his initial research for the project, Hersh posted on a message board looking for an actual surrogate for consultation and advice for the film. Someone then took a screenshot of the message and posted it in a Facebook group, where he met a woman willing to relay her experiences. Hersh also consulted with her during the pre-production of the film. In an interview with Filmmaker Magazine, Hersh revealed that lead actress Jasmine Batchelor had never been in a film before, but her "level of craft was at this incredibly high caliber". Hersh found Batchelor through Erica Hart, the casting director, who had been following the actress ever since seeing her perform at Juilliard.

The film does not have a music soundtrack, instead relying on the dialogue alone.

== Critical reception ==
Nell Minow of RogerEbert.com said the film has "many layers of complex, sensitive, and controversial subjects...but Hersh never lets it get preachy...he keeps the focus on the characters and their struggles to reconcile one of life's most painful dilemmas, the sometimes-vertiginous gap between what we think and what we feel". She rated the film 3.5 out of 4. Dennis Harvey wrote in his review for Variety that the film is "engrossing and very well-acted". He also argued that Hersh could have just taken the safe route of stereotypical tropes like "debating the rights of the disabled...the hierarchy of blacks vs. gays as societal underclasses", but instead he took this "garrulous but always psychologically plausible tale" and didn't let the film turn into that kind of "dramatized abstract...its characters may illuminate a number of thorny issues, but they never exist just to illustrate them". The Hollywood Reporter said the film is driven by a performance of "stunning psychological insight and raw feeling" from Jasmine Batchelor. They also praised Hersh for making the film "compelling and grounded in a firm foundation of what feels like an authentic experience".

Kate Erbland from Indie Wire gave the film a grade of B+. She also praised Batchelor's performance calling it "riveting and raw". Erbland noted that while this is Hersh's first feature film, he doesn't quite "stick the landing...but its path through thorny questions and seemingly unanswerable dilemmas makes for a thought-provoking, well-crafted watch". Glenn Kenny from The New York Times deviated from the mainstream view, saying the film "feels like the vexed progeny of an elevator pitch and an ethics advice column". He concluded with sharp criticism for Hersh, stating he portrayed the characters Josh and Aaron, "as glib and shallow bourgeois brats he clearly had conceived them as all along". Film Threat said the movie "strives to hit every emotional string you have in your body...it is definitely an emotional rollercoaster but can be considered too much for some viewers". They rated the film 6/10.

On the review aggregator website Rotten Tomatoes, 94% of 36 critics' reviews are positive, with an average rating of 7.4/10. The critics consensus on Rotten Tomatoes reads: "Led by an outstanding performance from Jasmine Batchelor, The Surrogate probes the heart of a thorny dilemma with strength and sensitivity". On Metacritic, the film has a score of 73, based on reviews from 12 critics.

== See also ==
- Surrogacy
- LGBT parenting
- List of LGBT-related films of 2020
