= Grantham Coleman =

American actor (born 1990)

- Born: Grantham Harlan Coleman II; 1990 (age 35–36); Missouri City, Texas, U.S.
- Education: Juilliard School (BFA)
- Occupation: Actor
- Years active: 2012–present

Grantham Coleman is an American actor. He studied drama at The Juilliard School, graduating in 2011.

== Career ==
=== Stage ===
Coleman made one of his first professional appearances on stage in 2012, playing Romeo in a production of Romeo and Juliet at the Actors Theatre of Louisville. He then had a minor role in a production of As You Like It directed by Daniel J. Sullivan at the Shakespeare in the Park festival at the Delacorte Theater in New York. Later that year he appeared in Jackie Sibblies Drury's We Are Proud To Present... at the Soho Repertory Theatre. In 2013, Coleman played Anthony Justin ("AJ") James in an off-Broadway production of Tarell Alvin McCraney's Choir Boy at the Manhattan Theatre Club. A year later he reprised the role in a Geffen Playhouse production in Los Angeles. Also in 2013, he appeared in the two-hander One Night... by Charles Fuller at the Cherry Lane Theater alongside Rutina Wesley. He appeared in Buzzer in 2015, a production by Anne Kauffman at The Public Theater in New York.

Coleman played the title role in Hamlet in 2017 at the Old Globe, directed by Barry Edelstein. He would later reprise the role in 2021 when Edelstein brought the case back together to perform the play for radio.

In 2018 he played Ferdinand in The Tempest at the Walt Disney Concert Hall, in a joint production between the Old Globe and the Los Angeles Philharmonic. During 2019 Coleman featured as an "adorably goofy" Benedick in Much Ado About Nothing performed during the Shakespeare in the Park festival in New York. One of the performances of Much Ado About Nothing was broadcast as part of the Great Performances series on PBS; it was particularly notable as the play featured an all-Black cast. Coleman received a Viv award for his part in the play. Later that year Coleman played Martin Luther King Jr. in Robert Schenkkan's The Great Society on Broadway alongside Brian Cox; he was nominated for an Antonyo Award for his performance. In 2022 he appeared as Macduff in a production of Macbeth at the Longacre Theatre in New York which starred Daniel Craig.

=== Television and film ===
Alongside his stage career, Coleman has appeared in a number of television shows, beginning in 2013 with an appearance in an early episode of the FX series The Americans. In 2015, he played characters in single episodes of The Night Shift, Murder in the First, and NCIS. In 2016, Coleman appeared as Bonnie Ray William in two episodes of the Stephen King adaptation 11.22.63 on Hulu. He had further small appearances in Doubt, NCIS: Los Angeles and The Carmichael Show during 2017.

In 2019, Coleman made his first movie appearance, playing Bobby Seale, a co-founder of the Black Panthers, in Benedict Andrews' political thriller Seberg. He appeared as Baako in the black comedy thriller Black Bear in 2020 and as Sigmund in the TV movie Red Bird Lane on HBO Max in 2021. He had minor roles in Bardo, False Chronicle of a Handful of Truths in 2022 and Rustin in 2023.

He returned to the small screen in 2023 with his first featured roles, firstly in all ten episodes of the third series of Power Book III: Raising Kanan, where he played the former convict Ronnie Mathis, and then appearing in all eight episodes of the Paramount+ Western series Lawmen: Bass Reeves, playing the character Edwin Jones.

In 2024, Deadline announced Coleman had been cast in his first lead role, as Tal Garland in the adaptation of the Stephen L. Carter novel The Emperor of Ocean Park alongside Forest Whitaker.

== Filmography ==
Film performances
Year	Title	Role	Notes
2019	Seberg	Bobby Seale	
2020	Black Bear	Baako	
2021	Red Bird Lane	Sigmund	
2022	Bardo, False Chronicle of a Handful of Truths	CNN Reporter	
2023	Rustin	Blyden	

Television performances
Year	Title	Role	Notes
2013	The Americans	Grayson	Episode: "The Clock"
2015	The Night Shift	Terrence	Episode: "Back at the Ranch"
2015	Murder in the First	RC	Episode: "Number Thirty Nine"
2015	NCIS	Richard Doogan	Episode: "Blood Brothers"
2016	11.22.63	Bonnie Ray Williams	2 episodes
2017	Doubt	Darryl Smallins	Episode: "Then and Now"
2017	NCIS: Los Angeles	Spence Taylor	Episode: "Queen Pin"
2017	The Carmichael Show	Kevin	Episode: "Support the Troops"
2019	Great Performances	Benedick	Episode: "Much Ado About Nothing"
2023	Power Book III: Raising Kanan	Ronnie Mathis	10 episodes
2023	Lawmen: Bass Reeves	Edwin Jones	8 episodes
2024	The Emperor of Ocean Park	Talcott Garland	10 episodes
