= Jasmine Batchelor =

American actress

- Born: 1990 (age 35–36); Philadelphia, Pennsylvania
- Occupation: Actress
- Years active: 2012–present

Jasmine Batchelor is an American actress. She is best known for playing Jess in the independent drama movie The Surrogate and Maxine in the mystery thriller series The Emperor of Ocean Park.

== Early life ==
Batchelor was born in Philadelphia, Pennsylvania but raised in Atlanta, Georgia.She is a graduate of the Juilliard School and Wright State University.

== Career ==
Her first recurring role came playing Detective Tonie Churlish in the crime series Law & Order: Special Victims Unit. Her first lead role in a film was in the drama movie The Surrogate. She also starred in the drama film I'll Be There. She is currently portraying Maxine in the mystery thriller series The Emperor of Ocean Park.

== Filmography ==
=== Film ===
Year	Title	Role	Notes
2012	18 Actors	Rebound Girl	Short
2016	Pretty Crystals	Irene	Short
2020	The Surrogate	Jess	
2020	Virtue	Sheila	
2021	A Journal for Jordan	Gwen Canedy	
2023	Three Birthdays	Nina	
2023	I'll Be There	Grace	

=== Television ===
Year	Title	Role	Notes
2016	Miss 2059	Endar	9 episodes
2016	The Affair	Charlette	Episode; Episode #3.1
2018	The Good Fight	Renee	Episode; Day 464
2020	NCIS: New Orleans	Audrey Spencer	Episode; The Real You
2019-2022	New Amsterdam	Courtney	6 episodes
2019-2023	Law & Order: Special Victims Unit	Detective Tonie Churlish	12 episodes
2023	Law & Order: Organized Crime	Detective Tonie Churlish	Episode; With Many Names
2024	The Emperor of Ocean Park	Maxine	6 episodes
