= Aneesh Sheth =

American actress

- Born: January 5, 1982 (age 44); Pune, India
- Education: New York University Tisch School of the Arts
- Occupations: Actor, filmmaker, activist
- Years active: 2011–present

Aneesh Sheth (born January 5, 1982) is an Indian-American actress and transgender activist.

== Biography ==
Aneesh Sheth was born in India, but moved to the United States when she was little. Her parents were "very supportive" of theatrical arts and Sheth chose to pursue a career resulting in acting on stage starting at the age of 7. In 2008, Sheth went through her transition after she chose to help LGBTQ kids by joining The Trevor Project and The Stigma Project. After hearing transgender people speak, Sheth realized that she too was trans and decided to begin the process. On coming out to her family, she faced both support and opposition. "Nearly everyone said that they weren’t surprised. I did experience some loss in certain relationships, but it strengthened some others. You learn that life is short and you don't have time to waste on people who aren't going to fully accept you for who you are."

Her first major acting role was as Kami Sutra in the short lived NBC sitcom Outsourced. She only appeared in 2 episodes, but considered it a turning point in her career stating, "I should not limit myself because of who I am". Sheth has appeared as Gillian in the third and final season of the Marvel Cinematic Universe television series Jessica Jones, released in 2019. Sheth said that she liked that her character being trans was not a major issue and was treated like a regular thing adding, "there’s no mention of [Gillian] being trans within the show, nor a narrative around her identity. Which I think is wonderful because trans people exist in the world and it’s not always about their [trans] narrative." In a similar way, no mention is made of her character Amy being trans in the 2023 movie Red, White and Royal Blue.

== Filmography ==
Year	Title	Role	Notes
2011	Outsourced	Kami Sutra	2 episodes
2011	My Inner Turmoil	Priya	Short film
2012	Arbore	Cypress	Short film
2015	Crave	Maggie	TV Pilot; Also writer, producer and director
2015	Semi-Secret	Valerie Derasport	
2017	Difficult People	Wendy	Episode: "Sweet Tea"
2018	A Kid Like Jake	Dr. Laurel Hendricks	
2018	High Maintenance	Ardhi	Episode: "Fagin"
2018–19	New Amsterdam	Lila	3 episodes
2019	Jessica Jones	Gillian	8 episodes
2019	Insomnia	Kat	Miniseries; 2 episodes
2020	First One In	Preeti	
2021	The Other Two	Rhadika Kamini Patel	Episode: "Chase Becomes Co-Owner of the Nets"
2022	The Walking Dead	Jan	Episode: "Rogue Element"
2023	Foul Play	Jen Smith / Gwen Kindtale	2 episodes
2023	Red, White and Royal Blue	Amy Gupta	
TBA	Red, White & Royal Wedding	Amy Gupta	Post-production
