= Tiffany Mack =

American actress

- Born: Los Angeles, California
- Occupation: Actress
- Years active: 2016–present

Tiffany Mack is an American actress. She is best known for playing Mariah Garland in the mystery thriller series The Emperor of Ocean Park.

== Career ==
Macks first big role in her career was playing Florida Grange in the drama series Hap and Leonard. Her next recurring role was playing Zaya Okonjo in the superhero series Jessica Jones. She was cast as Mariah Garland in The Emperor of Ocean Park starring Forest Whitaker.

== Personal life ==
Outside of acting she likes to draw and dance amongst other things, remarking that she is invested in "all arts things. She is married to Aaron Mueller.

== Filmography ==
=== Film ===
Year	Title	Role	Notes
2017	Forsaken	Alice	
2018	Townmouse	Woman	Short

=== Television ===
Year	Title	Role	Notes
2016	iZombie	Destiny	Episode; Pour Some Sugar, Zombie
2016	Timeless	Doc	Episode; The Watergate Tape
2017-2018	Hap and Leonard	Florida Grange	12 episodes
2019	Jessica Jones	Zaya Okonjo	9 episodes
2019	SEAL Team	Brie Campbell	Episode; Danger Crossing
2024	The Emperor of Ocean Park	Mariah Garland	10 episodes
