= Jeremy Bobb =

American actor (born 1981)

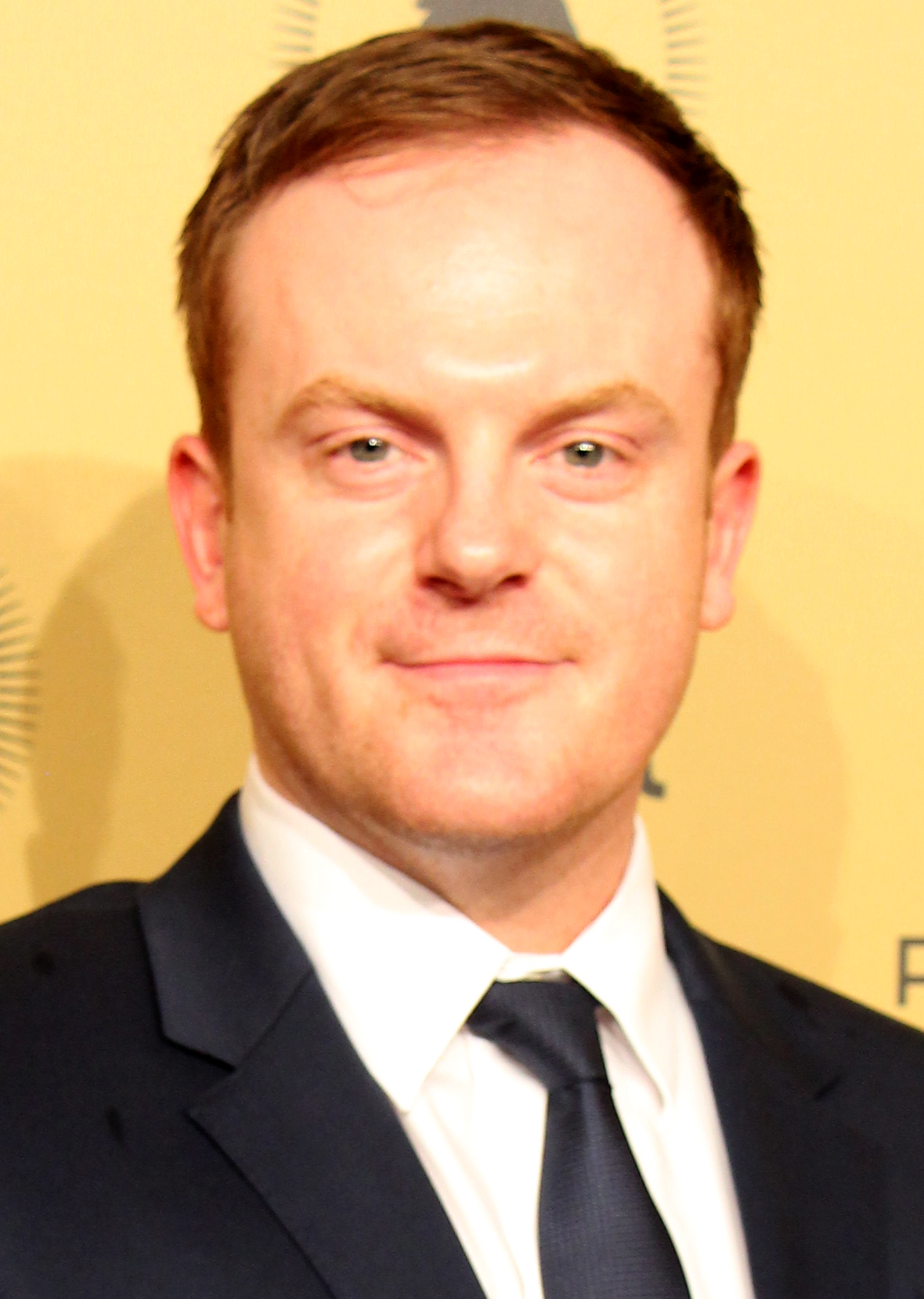
- Bobb at the 2015 Peabody Award
- Born: May 13, 1981 (age 45); Dublin, Ohio, U.S.
- Occupation: Actor
- Years active: 2005–present
- Known for: Hostages; The Knick; Russian Doll

Jeremy Bobb (born May 13, 1981) is an American actor who has appeared on stage, television and in feature films.

== Career ==
Bobb had a recurring role in CBS's 2013 drama Hostages as White House Chief of Staff Quintin Creasy and co-starred as Herman Barrow in the Cinemax TV series The Knick. In 2014, he played Stevie in the crime-drama film The Drop. In 2017 he played morally flexible frontier newspaperman A.T. Grigg in the Godless miniseries on Netflix. In 2019, Bobb appeared in the Netflix series Russian Doll. In 2023, he appeared as Detective Mayhew in the Peacock mini series The Continental.

== Personal life ==
Bobb attended Otterbein University and received a Bachelor of Fine Arts degree in 2003.

== Filmography ==
=== Film ===
| Year | Title | Role | Notes |
|---|---|---|---|
| 2007 | White Lies, Black Sheep | Josh | |
| 2010 | Boy Wonder | Artie | |
| 2013 | The Wolf of Wall Street | Police Officer | |
| 2014 | The Drop | Stevie | |
| 2017 | Going in Style | Donald Lewis | |
| 2017 | Marshall | John Strubing | |
| 2018 | Under the Silver Lake | Songwriter | |
| 2019 | The Wolf Hour | Officer Blake | |
| 2019 | The Kitchen | Rob Walsh | |
| 2020 | Funny Face | American Suit | |
| 2021 | South of Heaven | Frank | |
| 2022 | God's Country | Gus Wolf | |
| 2022 | Butcher's Crossing | Fred Schneider | |
| 2022 | Goodnight Mommy | Gary | |
| 2024 | Cabrini | Calloway | |

=== Television ===
| Year | Title | Role | Notes |
|---|---|---|---|
| 2010 | You Don't Know Jack | David Rivlin | TV movie |
| 2011–2020 | Law & Order: Special Victims Unit | Vincent Moran / Donny Greenway / ICE Agent Rory O'Toole | 3 episodes |
| 2013 | Blue Bloods | Jonathan Gelman | Episode: "Front Page News" |
| 2013 | Unforgettable | Treem | Episode: "Bigtime" |
| 2013 | Boardwalk Empire | Dickie Pastor | Episode: "New York Sour" |
| 2013 | Hostages | Quentin Creasy | 6 episodes |
| 2013–2016 | Inside Amy Schumer | Herman Barrow / Slap Chef | 2 episodes |
| 2014 | House of Cards | Nick Henslow | 3 episodes |
| 2014–2015 | The Knick | Herman Barrow | Main cast, 20 episodes |
| 2015 | Gotham | Owen Lloyd | Episode: "The Blind Fortune Teller" |
| 2015–2016 | Elementary | Agent Gary Burke | 2 episodes |
| 2016 | Billions | Hutch Bailey III | Episode: "YumTime" |
| 2016 | The Good Wife | Perry Dunst | Episode: "Monday" |
| 2016 | Mr. Robot | Joseph Green | Episode: "eps2.5_h4ndshake.sme" |
| 2017 | Manhunt: Unabomber | Stan Cole | 7 episodes |
| 2017 | Godless | A.T. Grigg | 6 episodes |
| 2017–2018 | Mosaic | Frank Scott | 8 episodes |
| 2018 | Escape at Dannemora | Dennis Lambert | 7 episodes |
| 2018–2020 | The Lake Erie Murders | Narrator (voice) | 17 episodes |
| 2019 | The Son | Eugene Monahan | 6 episodes |
| 2019 | Jessica Jones | Gregory Salinger / Foolkiller | Season 3, main cast |
| 2019–2022 | Russian Doll | Mike Kershaw | 6 episodes |
| 2020 | The Outsider | Alec Pelley | Miniseries |
| 2022 | The First Lady | Theodore Roosevelt | 2 episodes |
| 2023 | The Continental: From the World of John Wick | Mayhew | 3 episodes |
| 2024 | Them | Detective Ronald McKinney | 8 episodes |
| 2025 | Government Cheese | Manny Brinks | Main cast |
| 2026 | The Terminal List | Oliver Grey | 4 episodes |
| TBA | The Murder of JonBenét Ramsey | Pete Hofstrom | Upcoming series |
