= Rugir =

Rugir (Persian: روگير) may refer to:

- Rugir-e Hajji Mohammad Taqi
- Rugir-e Hasani
- Rugir-e Qaleh Hajji
- Rugir-e Taj Amiri
