= Clay Quartermain =

- Clay Quartermain as depicted in Strange Tales #167 (April 1968). Art by Jim Steranko.

Publication information
- Publisher: Marvel Comics
- First appearance: Strange Tales #163 (December 1967)
- Created by: Jim Steranko (writer / artist)

In-story information
- Alter ego: Clay Quartermain
- Team affiliations: S.H.I.E.L.D. S.H.I.E.L.D.'s Paranormal Containment Unit; Hulkbusters
- Abilities: Trained in espionage, firearms, hand-to-hand combat

Clay Quartermain is a fictional character, a secret agent appearing in American comic books published by Marvel Comics.

== Publication history ==
Created by writer-artist Jim Steranko, he first appeared in Strange Tales #163 (December 1967).

Described as a "blond-haired, fast-talking, grinning Burt Lancaster" sort, Clay Quartermain appears as an agent of the fictional espionage agency S.H.I.E.L.D., beginning in the feature "Nick Fury, Agent of S.H.I.E.L.D." in Marvel Comics' Strange Tales in 1967, and continuing into the subsequent series Nick Fury, Agent of S.H.I.E.L.D. in 1968. He was the S.H.I.E.L.D. liaison to the "Hulkbusters" military program, and a supporting character since The Incredible Hulk (vol. 2) #187 (May 1975).

A Life Model Decoy (LMD) replica of the character was a featured character in the 1988 miniseries Nick Fury vs. S.H.I.E.L.D.

Quartermain has since had guest appearances in issues of Alias, Cable, The Defenders, Marvel Team-Up, The Pulse, Silver Sable and the Wild Pack, and the miniseries Secret War; in the "Nick Fury" feature in the omnibus Marvel Holiday Special (January 1994); and in the "Elite Agents of S.H.I.E.L.D." feature in the one-shot Captain America 2000 (November 2000). He also led the S.H.I.E.L.D. Paranormal Containment Unit in the 2005–2006 series Nick Fury's Howling Commandos.

== Fictional character biography ==
Clay Quartermain is a high-ranking agent of the espionage agency S.H.I.E.L.D. who first worked with S.H.I.E.L.D. director Nick Fury during a conflict with Yellow Claw. Quartermain is part of the U.S. military's "Hulkbusters" operation, which attempted to capture and contain the Hulk. Quartermain and many other agents are seemingly killed by the "Deltan" variety of S.H.I.E.L.D. LMD androids (see below), but turns out to have survived.

Quartermain is later retconned into being a former romantic interest of Jessica Jones as well as the leader of S.H.I.E.L.D.'s Paranormal Containment Unit and a new incarnation of the S.H.I.E.L.D. "Hulkbusters" unit while recruiting She-Hulk. He is also an advisor to a co-called commander during the Hulk's rampage.

In the Alias series, Quartermain works with Jessica Jones to uncover a conspiracy against the President of the United States by investigating Mattie Franklin, a superheroine who was trapped in mysterious circumstances. Additionally, it is revealed Quartermain initially met Jones while the latter was recovering from a months-long ordeal with the Purple Man.

Quartermain is found dead in a suspected attack of the Red Hulk. It is later revealed that Quartermain was killed by Doc Samson after inadvertently learning of a plot by Thunderbolt Ross and Samson to keep the Red Hulk's identity secret.

=== LMD doppelgänger ===
A Life Model Decoy of the character is part of a self-aware, renegade "Deltan" variety of S.H.I.E.L.D.'s LMDs. The most advanced of the Deltite LMDs, he rebels upon learning it was not human, and is killed after several confrontations. The LMD of Quartermain later returns as an ally of Deadpool and Spider-Man.

== Other versions ==
An alternate universe version of Clay Quartermain from Earth-1610 appears in the Ultimate Marvel imprint.

== In other media ==
- Clay Quartermain appears in Nick Fury: Agent of S.H.I.E.L.D., portrayed by Adrian Hughes.
- Clay Quartermain appears in The Avengers: Earth's Mightiest Heroes, voiced by Troy Baker. This version is a field agent of S.H.I.E.L.D. and an acquaintance of the Avengers.
