= Kamali, Fars =

Village in Fars province, Iran

Kamali Persian: كمالي
- Village
- Location within Iran
- Coordinates: 27°33′53″N 53°07′37″E
- Country: Iran
- Province: Fars
- County: Lamerd
- District: Kheyrgu
- Rural District: Kamali

Population (2016)
  - Total: 1,312
- Time zone: UTC+3:30 (IRST)

Kamali (Persian: كمالي) (Note: Also romanized as Kamālī) is a village in, and the capital of, Kamali Rural District of Kheyrgu District, Lamerd County, Fars province, Iran.

== Demographics ==
=== Population ===
At the time of the 2006 National Census, the village's population was 1,236 in 248 households, when it was in Kheyrgu Rural District of Alamarvdasht District. The following census in 2011 counted 1,297 people in 325 households. The 2016 census measured the population of the village as 1,312 people in 362 households.

After the census, the rural district was separated from the district in the formation of Kheyrgu District, and Kamali was transferred to Kamali Rural District created in the new district.
