= Qaleh-e Moradi =

Qaleh-e Moradi قلعه مرادي
- Village
- Location within Iran
- Coordinates: 27°30′32″N 53°14′24″E
- Country: Iran
- Province: Fars
- County: Lamerd
- Bakhsh: Alamarvdasht
- Rural District: Kheyrgu

Population (2006)
  - Total: 147
- Time zone: UTC+3:30 (IRST)
  - Summer (DST): UTC+4:30 (IRDT)

Qaleh-e Moradi (Persian: قلعه مرادي, also Romanized as Qal‘eh-e Morādī) is a village in Kheyrgu Rural District, Alamarvdasht District, Lamerd County, Fars province, Iran. At the 2006 census, its population was 147, in 27 families.
