= Kamali Rural District =

Rural district in Fars province, Iran

Kamali Rural District Persian: دهستان کمالی
- Rural District
- Location within Iran
- Coordinates: 27°33′30″N 53°09′17″E
- Country: Iran
- Province: Fars
- County: Lamerd
- District: Kheyrgu
- Capital: Kamali
- Time zone: UTC+3:30 (IRST)

Kamali Rural District (Persian: دهستان کمالی) is in Kheyrgu District of Lamerd County, Fars province, Iran. Its capital is the village of Kamali, whose population at the time of the 2016 National Census was 1,312 in 362 households.

== History ==
After the 2016 census, Kheyrgu Rural District was separated from Alamarvdasht District in the formation of Kheyrgu District, and Kamali Rural District was created in the new district.
