= Devil's Reign =

2021-2022 Marvel Comics event

- Publisher: Marvel Comics
- Publication date: December 2021 – May 2022
- Main character(s): Daredevil; Elektra; Fantastic Four; Iron Man; Captain America; Spider-Man (Ben Reilly); Jessica Jones; Luke Cage; Spider-Man (Miles Morales); Mayor Wilson Fisk; Doctor Octopus; Superior Four; Moon Knight; Purple Man; Spider-Woman; Thunderbolts; X-Men

Creative team
- Writer: Chip Zdarsky
- Penciller: Marco Checchetto

"Devil's Reign" is an American comic book event written by Chip Zdarsky with art by Marco Checchetto, published from December 2021 to May 2022 by Marvel Comics. In the series, in a ploy to increase his power, Mayor Wilson Fisk outlaws all superheroes in New York City.

The series was adapted to the Marvel Cinematic Universe (MCU) across the first two seasons of the Disney+ series Daredevil: Born Again, starring Vincent D’Onofrio as Mayor Wilson Fisk, and to the seventh season of the video game Marvel Rivals, with Fisk voiced by Chris Okawa.

== Premise ==
In a ploy to increase his power, Mayor Wilson Fisk has outlawed superheroes ("vigilantes") in New York City.

== Plot ==
Mayor Wilson Fisk discovers physical evidence proving that he once knew Daredevil's true identity, noticing gaps in his own memory after the fact. Outraged, Fisk confronts Daredevil, who taunts him. Consequently, Fisk outlaws vigilantism in the city. To enforce his new law, Fisk sets up Thunderbolts units. Moon Knight, Danny Rand, Reed Richards, and Sue Storm are apprehended by the Thunderbolts and incarcerated in the Myrmidon. Luke Cage speaks out against Fisk while being filmed by onlookers. Fisk visits a captured Purple Man, cutting off the latter's finger to create a staff with mind-controlling abilities.

The remaining heroes gather at Avengers Mansion, where Tony Stark announces he plans to run for mayor opposite Fisk. The other heroes decide that Luke Cage is a better candidate, angering Stark. At City Hall, Fisk and Doctor Octopus discuss their plans to sway the populace of New York into reelecting Fisk by amplifying Purple Man's powers. Doctor Octopus uses Reed Richards's inter-dimensional gateway to summon alternate-universe Octopus versions of Hulk, Ghost Rider, and Wolverine. Meanwhile, Taskmaster fights Spider-Man, leaving Spider-Man severely injured.

Spider-Man is then brought to the police station, where he is rescued by the Thing and Human Torch. Luke Cage holds a rally to announce his mayoral campaign. At the Myrmidon, Sue Storm discusses the situation with her lawyer Kirsten McDuffie, who gives Sue a paperclip. Fisk discusses his plans with Purple Man, who notes that the Purple Children erased their memories of Daredevil's identity. Jessica Jones realizes that Fisk is using Purple Man to influence the city, prompting the Avengers to act immediately. They are intercepted by Doctor Octopus and his alternate selves; Stark is revealed to be Chameleon in disguise and in league with Doctor Octopus.

Two weeks later, Doctor Octopus has released Octobot drones to enforce Fisk's zero-tolerance policy, effectively wiping out all crime in the city. Daredevil visits Nelson, who is recovering in the hospital. Sue Storm uses the paperclip to remove her power-dampening collar, meeting with Reed Richards and breaking out of the Myrmidon with the other jailed heroes. The Champions battle Rhino, who saves the team from incoming Octobots. He explains that Fisk ordered the Thunderbolts to hunt down a group of children, who Miles Morales identifies as the Purple Children. Fisk discovers that his staff can restore memories and uses it on himself, rediscovering Daredevil's secret identity of Matt Murdock.

As the Purple Children are apprehended by the Thunderbolts, Jessica arrives with the Champions in an attempt to rescue them. They are driven away by Abomination, but are able to rescue one of the Purple Children, Joseph. The remaining Purple Children's' powers are given to their father to increase his power. Fisk then orders Purple Man to kill the superheroes. While Spider-Man works on reverse-engineering neural disruptors to protect the heroes from Purple Man, Joseph tells them that their only option to stop him is to kill him. The Avengers then go out to search for Purple Man, before discovering that he has taken control of the Thunderbolts and the general populace. Meanwhile, Fisk beats Matt's identical twin Mike Murdock to death, mistaking him for Matt.

McDuffie informs Daredevil of "Matt's" death, causing him to leave the main battle and hunt down Fisk, who is confronted by Elektra. Daredevil arrives, angering Fisk. The real Iron Man, Moon Knight, and the Fantastic Four arrive at the battle, while Joseph seeks out Purple Man. Luke Cage gives his neural disruptor to Joseph, who attempts to counter Purple Man. Cage fights off Purple Man's control and encourages Joseph, who defeats his father and is reunited with his siblings. At the same time, Daredevil uses Fisk's staff, forcing Fisk to hesitate while Daredevil subdues him. Daredevil then attempts to kill Fisk, but is stopped by Elektra who asks him what kind of symbol he wants to be. They leave Fisk to the authorities, automatically making Cage the new mayor. Fisk is taken to the Stromwyns, choosing to refuse their offer and fighting through their robots, leaving the role of Kingpin to his son, Butch Pharris.

=== Aftermath ===
A funeral is held for Mike Murdock, with Matt using the funeral to fake his death. Luke Cage later meets with Spectrum, with the two taking down Crossbones and the Thunderbolts agents with him. Upon defeating them, Cage and Spectrum are approached by the press and public relations specialist Helen Astrantia, who has been tasked with re-framing the Thunderbolts brand in a positive way with Spectrum leading them. As Spectrum does not want the job and flies off, Astrantia suggests Clint Barton as the Thunderbolts' leader. The next morning, Cage has his first press conference as mayor of New York City.

== Issues involved ==
=== Main series ===
Title	Issues	Writer	Artist	Colorist	Debut date	Conclusion date
Devil's Reign	1–6	Chip Zdarsky	Marco Checchetto	Marcio Menyz	December 8, 2021	April 6, 2022
Devil's Reign: Omega	1	Chip Zdarsky, Rodney Barnes, Jim Zub	Rafael de Larorre, Guillermo Sanna, Luciano Vecchio	Dljjo Lima, Javier Tartaglia, Carlos Lopez, Federico Blee	May 25, 2022	

=== Tie-in issues ===
Title	Issues	Writer(s)	Artist(s)	Colorist	Debut date	Conclusion date
Daredevil: Woman Without Fear	1–3	Chip Zdarsky	Rafael de Latorre	Federico Blee	January 12, 2022	March 2, 2022
Devil's Reign: Moon Knight	1	Jed MacKay	Federico Sabbatini	Lee Loughridge	March 2, 2022	
Devil's Reign: Spider-Man	1	Anthony Piper	Ze Carlos	Erick Arciniega	February 23, 2022	
Devil's Reign: Superior Four	1–3	Zac Thompson	Davide Tinto	Matt Milla	January 12, 2022	March 9, 2022
Devil's Reign: Villains for Hire	1–3	Clay McLeod Chapman	Manuel Garcia	Dono Sanchez-Almara	January 19, 2022	March 23, 2022
Devil's Reign: Winter Soldier	1	Jackson Lanzing & Collin Kelly	Nico Leon	Felipe Sobreiro	January 26, 2022	
Devil's Reign: X-Men	1–3	Gerry Duggan	Phil Noto		January 19, 2022	March 23, 2022
Moon Knight (vol. 9)	8	Jed MacKay	Alessandro Cappuccio	Rachelle Rosenberg	February 9, 2022	
Spider-Woman (vol. 7)	18–19	Karla Pacheco	Pere Perez	Frank D'Armata	January 12, 2022	February 2, 2022

== Collected editions ==
Title	Material collected	Published date	ISBN
Trade Paperbacks
Devil's Reign	Devil's Reign (2021) #1-6, Devil's Reign: Omega (2022) #1	23 August 2022	978-1302932848
Devil's Reign: X-Men	Devil's Reign: X-Men #1-3 and Devil's Reign: Winter Soldier	30 August 2022	978-1302934590
Devil's Reign: Superior Four	Devil's Reign: Superior Four #1-3 and Devil's Reign: Spider-Man	23 August 2022	978-1-302-94589-3
Devil's Reign: Villains For Hire	Devil's Reign: Villains For Hire #1-3 and Devil's Reign: Moon Knight	30 August 2022	978-1-302-94590-9
Omnibuses
Devil's Reign Omnibus	Devil's Reign #1-6, Spider-Woman (2020) #18-19, Daredevil: Woman Without Fear #1-3, Devil's Reign: Superior Four #1-3, Devil's Reign: Villains for Hire #1-3, Devil's Reign: Winter Soldier #1, Devil's Reign: X-Men #1-3, Devil's Reign: Spider-Man #1, Moon Knight (2021) #8, Devil's Reign: Moon Knight #1, Devil's Reign: Omega #1	9 Jan 2024	Marco Checchetto cover: 978-1302952921
Devil's Reign Omnibus	Devil's Reign #1-6, Spider-Woman (2020) #18-19, Daredevil: Woman Without Fear #1-3, Devil's Reign: Superior Four #1-3, Devil's Reign: Villains for Hire #1-3, Devil's Reign: Winter Soldier #1, Devil's Reign: X-Men #1-3, Devil's Reign: Spider-Man #1, Moon Knight (2021) #8, Devil's Reign: Moon Knight #1, Devil's Reign: Omega #1	9 Jan 2024	In-Hyuk Lee DM cover: 978-1302952938
Daredevil by Chip Zdarksy Omnibus Vol.2	Daredevil vol. 6 #31–36, Daredevil: Woman Without Fear (2022) 1-3, Devil's Reign (2021) 1-6, Devil's Reign Omega (2022) 1, Daredevil vol. 7 1-14	31 Dec 2024	Rafael De Latorre cover: 978-1302956264
Daredevil by Chip Zdarksy Omnibus Vol.2	Daredevil vol. 6 #31–36, Daredevil: Woman Without Fear (2022) 1-3, Devil's Reign (2021) 1-6, Devil's Reign Omega (2022) 1, Daredevil vol. 7 1-14	31 Dec 2024	Marco Checchetto DM cover: 978-1302956271

== In other media ==
- "Devil's Reign" was adapted to the Marvel Cinematic Universe (MCU) across the first two seasons of the Disney+ series Daredevil: Born Again (2025–2026), starring Vincent D'Onofrio as Wilson Fisk, with the Powers Act banning vigilantism and the use of superhuman abilities within city limits adapted as the "Safer Streets Iniatiative", and the Thunderbolt Units adapted as the Anti-Vigilante Task Force (AVTF), with Cole North portrayed by Jeremy Earl.
- "Devil's Reign" was adapted to the video game Marvel Rivals as the narrative backdrop of "Season 7: The Hunt Is On" in March 2026, featuring Chris Okawa as the voice of Wilson Fisk.
