= Chahar Taq, Lamerd =

Village in Fars province, Iran

Chahar Taq Persian: چهارطاق
- Village
- Location within Iran
- Coordinates: 27°30′27″N 53°16′20″E
- Country: Iran
- Province: Fars
- County: Lamerd
- District: Kheyrgu
- Rural District: Kheyrgu

Population (2016)
  - Total: 731
- Time zone: UTC+3:30 (IRST)

Chahar Taq (Persian: چهارطاق) (Note: Also romanized as Chahār Ţāq) is a village in, and the capital of, Kheyrgu Rural District of Kheyrgu District, Lamerd County, Fars province, Iran. The previous capital of the rural district was the village of Kheyrgu (now a city).

== Demographics ==
=== Population ===
At the time of the 2006 National Census, the village's population was 402 in 83 households, when it was in Alamarvdasht District. The following census in 2011 counted 543 people in 144 households. The 2016 census measured the population of the village as 731 people in 223 households. It was the most populous village in its rural district.

After the census, the rural district was separated from the district in the establishment of Kheyrgu District.
