= Jessica Jones (comic book) =

2016–2018 comic book series

- Cover of Jessica Jones #1 (October 2016); Art by David Mack

Publication information
- Publisher: Marvel Comics
- Schedule: Monthly
- Format: Ongoing series
- Genre: Superhero
- Publication date: List: (vol. 1) October 2016 – May 2018 (vol. 2) July 2018 – March 2019
- Main character: Jessica Jones

Creative team
- Created by: Brian Michael Bendis; Michael Gaydos
- Written by: List: (vol. 1) Brian Michael Bendis (vol. 2) Kelly Thompson
- Artist: List: (vol. 1) Michael Gaydos (vol. 2) Mattia de Lulis
- Colorist: List: (vol. 1) Matt Hollingsworth

Jessica Jones is an American comic book series published by Marvel Comics, featuring Jessica Jones as its protagonist. The series was written by Brian Michael Bendis with art from Michael Gaydos. The series ran for 18 issues as part of both Marvel's Marvel NOW! and Marvel Legacy relaunches and lasted from December 2016 until May 2018, when Bendis left Marvel for DC Comics. A digital exclusive relaunch with Kelly Thompson taking over from Bendis and Mattia de Luis taking over from Gaydos occurred in July 2018. The series is the third to feature Jones as a protagonist following Alias (2001–4) and The Pulse (2004–6), which both featured Bendis and Gaydos on the creative teams (Gaydos drew the last four issues of The Pulse).

== Publication history ==
The relaunched series was announced by Marvel in July 2016 with a release date that fall. The idea to bring back Jones in the comics was brought on through conversations Bendis had with Melissa Rosenberg, the creator of Netflix's Jessica Jones adaptation. Said Bendis, "Any time two writers are sitting there, talking about the character, both writers are formulating a pitch. You can't help it. It's the way your brain is trained. After talking about Jessica at WonderCon, I emailed Melissa later in the week and went, “Shit, I think I might have to do this. I'm thinking about doing the comic again, because the last conversation we had made me think of this.”

In an interview with Comic Book Resources, Bendis discussed how the new portrayal of Jones would be influenced by the changes in the Marvel Universe since 2004: "A lot has happened in the Marvel Universe over the past ten years, cosmic and seismic events. We’re all normal people, too, and that allows for unique mysteries and detective stories, ones that I'm going to lean into. With that came this overwhelming feeling that “something happened, and no one is talking about it.”

After Bendis' departure, many expected the series to be cancelled as part of a wave of Marvel cancellations in late 2017. The final issue, released in March 2018 (cover dated May) noted that the series would continue, "[leaving Jones] to an all new team next issue." The series has been compiled into three trade paperbacks, released in May and November 2017, as well as in April 2018.

Two months following the first volume's conclusion, a new serial run of Jessica Jones debuted as a digital exclusive written by Kelly Thompson and illustrated by Mattia de Luis.

== Reception ==
The series holds an average rating of 7.8 out of 10 on comics review aggregation website Comic Book Roundup, indicating generally favorable reviews from 149 critics. The first and last five issues were received well, but issues 6 to 11 had more mixed reviews. Of the first few issues, IGN's Jesse Schedeen said "It's been a long time coming, but Jessica Jones has the solo book she deserves again. And with both Brian Bendis and Michael Gaydos back at the helm, this new series has little trouble recapturing the appeal of its predecessor. The fact that so much about Jessica's life has reverted to the old status quo isn't a drawback, but rather one of the book's main selling points." Issue #7, which had the lowest score of the series at 6.8, was described by Graphic Policy as "...convoluted, unrealistic, and hackneyed. It is the epitome of what men think women want and are like. Bendis portrays Jones as a one-dimensional, agencyless, manic pixie detective for hire in her own story."

== Sales ==
The comic's first issue was the 22nd best-selling comic of October 2016, with 74,291 estimated sales. The series stayed in the Diamond Comic Distributors top 100 list until May 2017, when it dropped to 115th. After a jump to 46th in October 2017 with 43,392 sales, the series fell to 113th the following month. The comic's final issue was the 112th best-selling comic of March 2018, selling 17,553 issues.

== Collected editions ==
Title	Material collected	Publication date	ISBN
Jessica Jones Vol. 1: Uncaged!	Jessica Jones #1–6	May 2017	978-1302906351
Jessica Jones Vol. 2: The Secrets of Maria Hill	Jessica Jones #7–12	November 2017	978-1302906368
Jessica Jones Vol. 3: Return of the Purple Man	Jessica Jones #13–18	April 2018	978-1302906375
Jessica Jones: Blind Spot	Jessica Jones: MDO Digital Comic #1–3	November 2018	978-1302912925
Jessica Jones: Purple Daughter	Jessica Jones: Purple Daughter MDO Digital Comic #1–3	April 2019	978-1302915117
Jessica Jones: Blind Spot	Jessica Jones: MDO Digital Comic #1–3, Jessica Jones: Purple Daughter MDO Digital Comic #1–3	March 2026	978-1302968694
