= Power Woman =

Power Woman may refer to:

- Nele DB
- Power Girl, the Earth-Two cousin of Superman in DC Comics
- Jessica Jones or Power Woman, the wife of Luke Cage in Marvel Comics
