= Alias (comics) =

Comic book series that introduced Jessica Jones

- Promotional art for cover of Alias #23; Art by David Mack and Mark Bagley

Publication information
- Publisher: MAX (Marvel Comics)
- Schedule: Monthly
- Genre: Mystery, superhero
- Publication date: September 2001 – November 2003
- No. of issues: 28
- Main characters: Jessica Jones P.I.; Carol Danvers; Luke Cage; Scott Lang; Jessica Drew P.I. (The Underneath); Purple Man (Purple)

Creative team
- Created by: Brian Michael Bendis
- Written by: Brian Michael Bendis
- Artist: Michael Gaydos
- Letterers: Richard Starkings; Oscar Gongora; Wes Abbott; Cory Petit
- Colorist: Matt Hollingsworth
- Editors: Stuart Moore; Kelly Lamy; Nanci Quesada/Dakesian; Joe Quesada

Collected editions
- Omnibus: ISBN 0-7851-2121-8

Alias is a comic book series created by writer Brian Michael Bendis and artist Michael Gaydos. It was published by Marvel Comics under Marvel's MAX imprint for a total of 28 issues from 2001 to 2004.

The protagonist of Alias is Jessica Jones, a former costumed superhero named Jewel who left that life behind to become a private investigator. The running thread is Jessica's character development, as her past and personality are revealed to the reader while, simultaneously, she tries to come to terms with them herself.

Characters from the series moved to Bendis' subsequent series The Pulse. The series received generally positive reviews from critics.

Alias was the basis of the first season of the Netflix Marvel Cinematic Universe (MCU) series Jessica Jones, which premiered in November 2015. Jessica Jones, a follow-up ongoing series to Alias created by Bendis and Gaydos as a tie-in to the television series, began publication in 2016.

== Publication history ==
Alias was one of the titles that launched Marvel's "R-Rated" MAX imprint. It was written by Bendis and illustrated for most of its run by Michael Gaydos, with covers by David W. Mack. Bendis relates in a text piece on the letters page of the book's final issue that it was one of the reasons the imprint was created. Marvel Publishing President Bill Jemas read a draft of the script for the first issue of Alias (which, characteristically, starts with the word "fuck") and exclaimed, "Why couldn't we publish this?"

Being under the MAX imprint imposed certain other limitations on what the creators could do in the series. Bendis gave this as one reason for ending the series and moving the characters to The Pulse.

In a 2005 interview, Bendis revealed that originally, Alias was plotted to be an explicitly out-of-continuity story following a reinvention of superhero private investigator Jessica Drew returning to her P.I. roots, before deciding to have his reinvention simply be a new unrelated brunette P.I. also named Jessica, deciding the character had a "distinct background and voice from Drew's", giving the character the new surname "Jones" while still keeping the first name "Jessica" (after Drew) on the basis of how "two [people] can have the same first name".

Previously, Bendis commented:

"I was at one time toying with doing Jessica Drew because she has the best hair of any superhero in comics, but this book is entirely different than what that idea was to be. This character is totally different in every way but sexual gender. And there's that Jessica name that's not going to help me convince anyone. Any writer can tell you that the development process can be a sparkling and surprising one. You start in one place and end up in an entirely different one. I was also toying with a pornographic version of Dial H for Hero, doesn't mean that this is that book either."

Some of the flashbacks to Jessica Jones's past are drawn in the style of classic 1960s, 1970s, 1980s and 1990s Marvel Comics issues.

== Story arcs ==
=== "Alias Investigations" and "B Level" (#1–9) ===
Tasked to look for a missing woman, private investigator Jessica Jones finds herself caught in a conspiracy involving Captain America and the President of the United States. Subsequently, she is hired to find the recently missing Rick Jones. The first issue introduces her relationship with Luke Cage, whom she sleeps with after meeting him at a bar. The arc also establishes Jessica's friendship with Carol Danvers, who attempts to set her up with Scott Lang. Other characters appearing in the arc include Matt Murdock and Man Mountain Marko.

=== "Come Home" (#11–15) ===
Jessica Jones is assigned to look for a missing girl rumored to be a mutant in a small, prejudiced town. She discovers the girl is a runaway and brings her home.

Issue #15 overlaps with Daredevil (Vol. 2) #36, which was also written by Brian Michael Bendis. Both issues depict the same scene, in which a disguised Natasha Romanova visits Matt Murdock at his law office, from two different perspectives. The Alias scene focuses on Jessica and Luke Cage, who argue about their relationship while stood guard outside Murdock's office, while the Daredevil version of the scene depicts his conversation with Natasha. The issue goes on to show Jessica's first date with Scott Lang.

=== "The Underneath" (#10, 16–21) ===
J. Jonah Jameson hires Jessica to uncover Spider-Man's identity. Later, Mattie Franklin, the latest Spider-Woman and Jameson's stepdaughter, goes missing and Jessica is asked to find her. In the course of her investigation she discovers that Mattie is embroiled in a criminal underworld producing Mutant Growth Hormone, a drug designed to give ordinary people super-powered abilities. Along the way, Jones meets an unexpected ally in fellow private investigator Jessica Drew, the original Spider-Woman, who is also investigating Franklin's disappearance. Meanwhile, Jessica's relationship with Scott Lang becomes strained after an encounter with Madame Web dredges up bad memories from her past.

=== "The Secret Origins of Jessica Jones" (issues #22–23) ===
Issues #22-23 depict Jessica's teenage years, revealing that she attended Midtown High School with Peter Parker, whom she secretly had a crush on and was present when he was bitten by the spider that gave him his powers. Jessica, then known as Jessica Campbell, loses her parents and brother in a car crash involving truck carrying hazardous materials. After waking up from a coma, Jessica is taken in by the Jones family, and soon discovers that she has developed super-powers. The story ends with Jessica deciding to become a superhero.

=== "Purple" (issues #24–28) ===
Family members of those murdered by the Purple Man ask Jessica to find evidence of those murders that he never confessed to. Jessica is initially reluctant, due to her history with the Purple Man. After drinking and ending up at Luke Cage's apartment, Jessica tells Luke about her history with the Purple Man. During her career as a superhero called Jewel, Jessica encountered the Purple Man at a restaurant. He mind-controlled Jessica for eight months, forcing her to bathe him, watch him have sex with other women, and making her beg for his attention. One day, in a fit of rage the Purple Man ordered Jessica to go and kill superheroes. Although the ensuing fight broke the mind-control over her, Jessica was mistaken for a threat by the Avengers and badly beaten. Jean Grey helped Jessica awaken from her resulting coma, and implanted a psychic defense in her mind in case of future encounters with the Purple Man.

After confronting the Purple Man in prison, he escapes and Jessica is forced to deal with him and her past trauma. Jean Grey triggers Jessica's psychic defense, allowing her to defeat him. In the aftermath of the fight, Jessica tells Scott Lang that she is three months pregnant, and that he is not the father. Later that day, Luke arrives to confess his feelings for her. She tells him that she is pregnant with his child, and the series ends with them about to begin a new chapter of their lives.

== Collected editions ==
Title	Material collected	Date published	ISBN
Alias Investigations: B Level	Alias #1–9	May 2003	978-0785111412
Alias Vol. 2: Come Home	Alias #11–15	February 2003	978-0785111238
Alias Vol. 3: The Underneath	Alias #10, 16–21	June 2003	978-0785111658
Alias Vol. 4: The Secret Origins of Jessica Jones/Purple	Alias #22–28	November 2004	978-0785111672
Alias Ultimate Collection Vol. 1	Alias #1–15	May 2009	978-0785137320
Alias Ultimate Collection Vol. 2	Alias #16–28	February 2010	978-0785144908
Alias Omnibus	Alias #1–28, What If? Jessica Jones had Joined the Avengers	March 2006	978-0785121213

These have since been rereleased with the title of Jessica Jones: Alias.

== Critical reception ==
The entire series received generally positive reviews from critics. According to Comicbook Roundup, the series received an average rating of 7.5 out of 10 based on 28 reviews.

== Awards ==
The series won the Comics Buyer's Guide Award for "Favorite Comic Series" in 2003, and the Harvey Award for "Best New Series" in 2002.

The series was also nominated for two Eisner Awards in 2004: "Best Continuing Series" and "Best Serialized Story" (for "The Secret Origin of Jessica Jones" & "Purple" in Alias #22–28).

== In other media ==
Alias was adapted into the first season of the Marvel Cinematic Universe television series Jessica Jones. Carol Danvers was replaced by Trish Walker (a composite character of Danvers, Foolkiller, and Patsy Walker) due to the simultaneous development of Captain Marvel (2019).
