= Powerless (comics) =

2004–2005 comic book limited series published by Marvel Comics

- Cover for the collected edition of Powerless. Art by Alex Maleev

Publication information
- Publisher: Marvel Comics
- Format: Limited series
- Genre: Superhero
- Publication date: August 1, 2004 — January 1, 2005
- No. of issues: 6
- Main character(s): William Watts; Peter Parker; Logan; Matt Murdock; Frank Castle; Bruce Banner; Norman Osborn; Wilson Fisk; Eric Magnus; Gwen Stacy

Creative team
- Written by: Matt Cherniss; Peter Johnson
- Artist: Michael Gaydos
- Colorist: Lee Loughridge

Powerless is an American comic book published by Marvel Comics. The six-issue limited series–written by Matt Cherniss and Peter Johnson, and illustrated by Michael Gaydos–began its monthly publication on August 1, 2004 and ended on January 1, 2005. It features characters from the Marvel Universe in a world where superpowers do not exist.

== Plot summary ==
A psychologist named William Watts wakes up in a hospital after a three-day coma. Fresh in his mind is the world of Earth-616, which he experienced while asleep. As William returns to his mundane daily life, he encounters three familiar faces: Peter Parker, a high-school student who is pressured by Oscorp CEO Norman Osborn to conduct industrial espionage against Stark Industries; Matt Murdock, a blind lawyer who battles an uphill case against crime boss Wilson Fisk to absolve disgraced cop Frank Castle of murder; and Logan, an amnesiac soldier who is led to believe he murdered Charles Xavier, one of William's patients.

Inspired by Matt's conviction, William leaves his bystander position and begins to act to help the three: he helps reveal Charles' murder was done by a third party, citing Logan to investigate Eric Magnus; he convinces Castle to reveal vital information to Matt's case; and he puts Peter in touch with the authorities to apprehend Osborn, who attempts to murder Peter's girlfriend Gwen Stacy, but gets himself accidentally killed instead. Castle is freed, and when Matt is killed in retaliation, Castle assassinates Fisk. The series ends with William contemplating how the coma has shaken him from the stupor of life, as he reflects on his coma identity as Uatu.

== Publication history ==
The comic book limited series Powerless–written by Matt Cherniss and Peter Johnson, and illustrated by Michael Gaydos–began monthly publication by Marvel Comics with the release of its first issue on August 1, 2004, and concluded with the launch of its sixth and final issue on January 1, 2005. A collected edition of Powerless was released on January 5 of the same year.

=== Issues ===
Issue	Publication date	Ref.
#1	August 1, 2004	
#2	September 1, 2004	
#3	October 1, 2004	
#4	November 1, 2004	
#5	December 1, 2004	
#6	January 1, 2005	

=== Collected editions ===
Title	Material collected	Release date	ISBN	Ref.
Powerless	Powerless #1–6	January 5, 2005	ISBN 0-7851-1511-0	
