= Jessica Jones =

Comic book superheroine

- Artwork from The Pulse #14 (May 2006). Pictured clockwise from top left: Jones as Jewel; with husband Luke Cage; with daughter Danielle; as Knightress. Art by Mike Mayhew.

Publication information
- Publisher: Marvel Comics
- First appearance: As Peter's classmate: (Retroactive); The Amazing Spider-Man #4 (June 1963); As Jessica Jones: Alias #1 (November 2001)
- Created by: Brian Michael Bendis (writer); Michael Gaydos (artist); (Based on Jessica Drew by Archie Goodwin and Marie Severin, and the unnamed character by writer Stan Lee and artist Steve Ditko)

In-story information
- Full name: Jessica Campbell Jones-Cage
- Species: Human mutate
- Team affiliations: New Avengers; Defenders; The Pulse Magazine; A-Force; Avengers; Alias Private Investigations; Daily Bugle
- Partnerships: Luke Cage; Carol Danvers
- Notable aliases: Jewel; Knightress; Power Woman
- Abilities: Superhuman strength and durability; Accelerated healing factor; Skilled hand-to-hand combatant; Psionic Resistance; Flight; Expert detective

Jessica Campbell Jones-Cage, professionally known as Jessica Jones, is a superhero appearing in American comic books published by Marvel Comics. The character was created by writer Brian Michael Bendis and artist Michael Gaydos and first appeared in Alias #1 (November 2001) as part of Marvel's MAX, an imprint for more mature content, and was later retroactively established to have first appeared in The Amazing Spider-Man #4 (June 1963) in the Silver Age of Comic Books as an unnamed classmate of Peter Parker, created by writer-editor Stan Lee and artist Steve Ditko. Within the context of Marvel's shared universe, Jones is a former superhero who becomes the owner (and usually sole employee) of Alias Private Investigations. Bendis envisioned the series as centered on the private investigator superhero Jessica Drew, designing and characterising Jones as a reinvention of Drew returning to her P.I. origins, only deciding to make her a new P.I. character once he realized that the main character he was writing had a distinct-enough voice and background to differentiate her from Drew, though deciding to still name the character Jessica (after Drew) on the basis of how "two [people] can have the same first name".

Jones has since starred in three ongoing series: Alias, The Pulse, and Jessica Jones. Alias ran for 28 issues before ending in 2004, while The Pulse ran for 14 issues from April 2004 to May 2006. Jessica Jones debuted in October 2016, initially published as a tie-in with the self-titled television series. She became a member of the New Avengers, alongside her husband Luke Cage during Marvel's 2010 Heroic Age campaign. After the events of Devil's Reign in which Cage became the Mayor of New York City, Jones is now the first lady of New York City.

She has used various aliases throughout her history, including Jewel, Knightress, Mrs. Cage, and Power Woman. Jessica Jones has been described as one of Marvel's most powerful female heroes.

Krysten Ritter portrays the character in the Marvel Cinematic Universe (MCU) streaming television series Jessica Jones (2015–2019), The Defenders (2017), and Daredevil: Born Again (2026–present). Elizabeth Cappuccino portrayed a young Jones in the first and second seasons of Jessica Jones. Tara Strong voices the character in the video games Lego Marvel's Avengers, Marvel Heroes, and Marvel Ultimate Alliance 3: The Black Order, while Michelle Phan voices a Vietnamese American version of the character in the video game Marvel Avengers Academy.

== Creation ==
Jessica Jones debuted in the Marvel MAX imprint series Alias in November 2001. The character and series were created by writer Brian Michael Bendis and artist Michael Gaydos. While Jones was created in 2001, she was retroactively established to have appeared earlier: in Alias #22, it is revealed that Jones appears just off-panel in the events of Amazing Fantasy #15 (August 1962), the first appearance of Spider-Man, and Bendis's story in The Amazing Spider-Man #601 retroactively establishes her to have first appeared in The Amazing Spider-Man #4 (June 1963) as an unnamed classmate of Peter Parker. Alias ran for 28 issues from 2001 to 2004, with most covers drawn by David W. Mack. After the end of the series, Jones and other characters from the series moved to Bendis' subsequent series, The Pulse. In a 2005 interview, Bendis revealed that "Originally, Alias was going to star Jessica Drew, but it became something else entirely. Which is good, because had we used Jessica, it would have been off continuity and bad storytelling." Previously, Bendis commented:

"I was at one time toying with doing Jessica Drew because she has the best hair of any superhero in comics, but this book is entirely different than what that idea was to be. This character is totally different in every way but sexual gender. And there's that Jessica name that's not going to help me convince anyone. Any writer can tell you that the development process can be a sparkling and surprising one. You start in one place and end up in an entirely different one. I was also toying with a pornographic version of Dial H for Hero, doesn't mean that this is that book either."

While initially scripting and plotting Alias as following a previous reinvention of Drew as a private investigator, ultimately, in actively developing the title, Bendis decided to make her a new character, Jones, with a "distinct background and voice from Drew's", while deciding to still give this character the first name Jessica.

Jessica Jones appeared as a regular character throughout the 2010-2013 New Avengers series, from issue #1 (August 2010) through its final issue, #34 (January 2013). In a Marvel Comics podcast, Bendis expressed his desire to incorporate Jones into the parallel universe Ultimate Marvel imprint. An alternate version of Jones consequentially appears as a senior at the Ultimate Peter Parker's high school in Ultimate Spider-Man #106, becoming a recurring supporting character in the series.

== Fictional character biography ==
=== Origin ===
Midtown High student Jessica Campbell goes to school with Peter Parker, on whom she has a crush and is present when he is bitten by the irradiated spider which gives him his powers. She attempts to talk to him at that moment only to flee out of shyness after he reacts from his spider bite.

Jessica's father receives tickets to Walt Disney World from his boss Tony Stark. On the way home, their car collides with a military convoy carrying radioactive chemicals. Her family is killed, and she spends several months in a coma. Upon waking up, she is placed in an orphanage and adopted by Alisa Jones and Mr. Jones. Jessica later discovers that her radiation exposure granted her super strength, limited invulnerability, and flight.

Jessica's adoptive parents re-enroll her at Midtown High, where she is ostracized by her classmates, especially Flash Thompson. Peter Parker (who has since become Spider-Man and lost his Uncle Ben) senses in Jessica a kindred spirit—someone who has also lost her family due to a tragic circumstance. Jessica mistakes his kind attention for pity and lashes out at him. She later witnesses a fight between Spider-Man and the villain Sandman in her school. This inspires her to use her abilities for positive ends.

=== Early years ===
As Jewel, Jones has a fairly uneventful superhero career until she intervenes in a disturbance at a restaurant involving Zebediah Killgrave, the Purple Man. Killgrave uses his power of mind control to place Jones under his command, psychologically torturing her and forcing her to aid his criminal schemes. After Killgrave sends her to kill Daredevil at the Avengers Mansion, Jones is rescued by Carol Danvers, the only Avenger who actually knows her. Jones undergoes psychic therapy with Jean Grey of the X-Men, who places a special mental command in Jones's subconscious to protect her from further mind control. During this time, Jones begins a brief romantic relationship with S.H.I.E.L.D. agent Clay Quartermain.

Due to the traumatic violation of her mind by Killgrave and the fact that she was barely noticed missing for eight months, a demoralized and depressed Jones gives up her costumed superhero life. She briefly adopts a darker identity as the Knightress and interrupts a crime meeting between the Owl and a mafioso, through which she meets up with fellow superhero Luke Cage. After defeating the Owl, she and Cage develop a lasting friendship. No longer a superhero, Jones opens a private detective agency. Longtime friend Carol Danvers sets Jones up with Scott Lang (the second Ant-Man), and the two date for several months. She also has an off-and-on affair with Cage.

Killgrave, still obsessed with Jones, escapes from high-security incarceration, but with the mental defenses Grey gave her, Jones breaks his control and knocks him out.

Later, Cage and Jones admit their feelings for each other. After she becomes pregnant with their child, they commit to their relationship.

=== The Pulse and Young Avengers ===
Jones takes a leave from the detective business and joins the staff of the Daily Bugle newspaper as a superhero correspondent and consultant, becoming a main character of the comic book The Pulse and a contributor to the same-name fictional newspaper supplement within. A pregnant Jones is attacked by the Green Goblin after the Bugle reported that he was secretly industrialist Norman Osborn. In response, Cage retaliates, and Osborn is exposed as the Goblin upon his defeat and incarceration.

Jones quits her job with the Bugle after publisher J. Jonah Jameson uses the paper to smear the New Avengers. Jones and Cage are living together when she gives birth to their child, whom they name Danielle after Cage's best friend, Danny Rand. Cage and Jones marry.

Jones appears as a supporting character in Young Avengers until the series ended. She returns in Avengers: The Children's Crusade #6 in which she, Beast, and Hawkeye attempted to defuse the situation between the Avengers and X-Men who were fighting over who was to punish the Scarlet Witch. She helps fight Doctor Doom and is present when Stature and the Vision are killed.

=== "Civil War", "Secret Invasion" and "Dark Reign" ===
In Marvel's 2006–2007 crossover storyline "Civil War", Jones and Cage reject Iron Man and Ms. Marvel's offer to join the Superhuman Registration Act. As part of the New Avengers, Jones moves into Doctor Strange's Sanctum Sanctorum, but after an attack involving the Hood, Jones is shaken by the experience. Desperate to protect her child, she leaves the New Avengers and registers for the Superhuman Registration Act, ending her relationship with Cage.

During the "Secret Invasion" storyline, Jones is captured and replaced with a Skrull. The real Jones appears in "Secret Invasion" #7, in which she joins in the heroes' fight against the Skrulls and is reunited with Luke Cage. After the Skrulls surrender, the Skrull impersonating Edwin Jarvis disappears with Danielle, leaving Jones desperate.

Jones is unaware that Cage has asked Norman Osborn for help in their search for Danielle. Osborn helps Cage recover Danielle, who is reunited with Jones. Spider-Man reveals himself as Peter Parker to the New Avengers, leaving Jones shocked to see that her former classmate is Spider-Man. She then tells Peter of her former crush on him, only to find out that he did not recognize her all this time, let alone remember her name, only remembering her as "Coma Girl", upsetting her. Jones later assists the Avengers in rescuing Hawkeye after he is captured by Osborn. Jones reveals that she was inspired to become a superheroine after witnessing an early battle between Spider-Man and Sandman. Peter then tries to convince Jones to return to the life of a superhero, suggesting that she could provide a better example for her daughter by going into action as a hero rather than simply telling her daughter about her old career.

=== 2010–present ===
During the storylines of Marvel's 2010 "Heroic Age" branding campaign, Jones takes Peter's advice seriously and takes up the identity of Jewel once again as a member of the New Avengers. She and Cage decide to hire a nanny, interviewing characters featured from other comics set in the Marvel Universe. Ultimately, Squirrel Girl is chosen as Danielle's nanny. Jones changes her codename to Power Woman to both honor her husband, Power Man (Luke Cage) and because she considers it a more inspiring choice for Danielle. However, following several incidents revolving around Thule Society attacking Avengers Mansion, and Norman Osborn's threat, Jones quits the team and goes into hiding, realizing that it is too dangerous for Danielle to remain in Avengers Mansion due to the numerous potential threats.

Jones later appears as an ally to the Mighty Avengers team formed by Luke Cage. Jones and Danielle live in the apartment of the Gem Theater, which was serving as the Mighty Avengers' base. She and Cage are confronted by the Superior Spider-Man and his Spider Robots, who offer Jones a place on a different type of Avengers team that was to be run by him. Jones swiftly finds a babysitter for her child and refuses before delivering a powerful punch to Spider-Man's face for his threat. Jones and Cage later switch apartments with an old friend of Cage, David Griffith. While moving in, Jones speaks with Blue Marvel about what it is like to raise a child of superheroes and expresses both her support and annoyance at Cage's choice to start another team of Avengers.

In October 2016, Jessica Jones, a new ongoing series, debuted. Another title, Defenders, was launched in 2017. Jones is one of its main characters.

In 2022, The Variants, a five-issue limited series by writer Gail Simone and artist Phil Noto, began. The series is about Jones taking on a case that leads her to meet alternate universe versions of herself.

In 2026, Jones was featured in a five-issue mini-series titled Alias: Red Band, in which she tracks a serial killer with the aid of Typhoid Mary.

== Powers and abilities ==
After coming into contact with experimental chemicals and spending some time in a coma, Jessica Jones emerged with superhuman abilities. She possesses superhuman strength and durability, as well as flight, and can block mind control. She is strong enough to lift 10 tons and has the capacity to pick up a two-ton police car with little effort. Her strength has allowed her to lift up a giant-sized Goliath by the nostrils and toss him a short distance, break Atlas's nose, and render her fellow superheroine Jessica Drew unconscious with a single punch to the face. She later withstood being punched by a human on Mutant-Growth Hormone, sustained only mild bruising and a bloody nose, and was able to recover in moments, after being shocked by Jessica Drew's venom blasts. Despite this resistance to harm, Jones sustained severe injuries, including a damaged spine and neck, a detached retina, and a broken nose after being attacked by both the Vision and Iron Man. She is also able to heal faster and more effectively than normal rate.

Jones is also able to fly, and while she was able to fly quite well during her early years as a heroine, she has admitted that her flying ability degenerated while she was no longer an active hero. She has since displayed improved flying ability after joining the New Avengers.

After her ordeal at the hands of the Purple Man, Jones was given a degree of psionic protection by Jean Grey of the X-Men. This psionic protection was sufficient to protect Jones against a second attack by the Purple Man, though she had to "trigger" this resistance on her own.

In addition to her superhuman powers, Jones is a skilled detective and investigative journalist.

== Cultural impact and legacy ==
=== Critical reception ===
George Marston of Newsarama called Jessica Jones one of the "best female superheroes of all time," asserting, "Jessica Jones isn't your typical superhero – like her husband, Luke Cage, she doesn't even have a superhero codename that's stuck. But that's part of what makes her so great." Gavia Baker-Whitelaw of The Daily Dot referred to Jones as one "greatest female superheroes of all time" and "a truly modern subversion of the superhero genre".

Shawn S. Lealos of Screen Rant referred to the character as a "huge star," stating, "Jessica Jones became a household name when her Marvel Netflix series was a critical hit." Gary Walker of CBR.com called her one of Marvel's "most seasoned street-level heroes," stating, "Jessica Jones has the abilities of someone who should be helping out Captain Marvel or even the Guardians of the Galaxy. Using her private investigator skill-set, she's one hell of a vigilante and one resourceful mother!"

Rosie Knight of Nerdist described the character as one of the "most brilliant women who solve crimes in the pages of your fave comic." Ned Beauman of The Guardian called her "one of the bravest, wittiest and most sensitive portraits of a female character that superhero comics have ever seen. Plus, she had a realistic body and didn't try to battle evil in a gold bikini and stiletto heels."

=== Accolades ===
- In 2016, The Hollywood Reporter ranked Jessica Jones 28th in their "50 Favorite Female Characters" list.
- In 2016, Entertainment Weekly ranked Jessica Jones 39th in their "Most Powerful Superheroes" list.
- In 2017, The Daily Dot ranked Jessica Jones 21st in their "Top 33 female superheroes of all time" list.
- In 2018, CBR.com ranked Jessica Jones 7th in their "Marvel's 20 Most Seasoned Street-Level Heroes" list.
- In 2018, GameSpot ranked Jessica Jones 25th in their "50 Most Important Superheroes" list.
- In 2019, ComicBook.com ranked Jessica Jones 23rd in their "50 Most Important Superheroes Ever" list.
- In 2019, CBR.com ranked Jessica Jones 6th in their "Marvel: 10 Best Street Level Heroes" list.
- In 2020, Scary Mommy ranked Jessica Jones 4th in their "Looking For A Role Model? These 195+ Marvel Female Characters Are Truly Heroic" list.
- In 2020, CBR.com ranked Jessica Jones 3rd in their "10 Best Detectives In Marvel Comics" list.
- In 2020, TheWrap included Jessica Jones in their "24 Badass Female Superheroes" list.
- In 2021, CBR.com ranked Jessica Jones 16th in their "20 Most Powerful Female Members Of The Avengers" list and 20th in their "20 Strongest Female Superheroes" list.
- In 2022, Newsarama ranked Jessica Jones 22nd in their "Best female superheroes" list.
- In 2022, The A.V. Club ranked Jessica Jones 16th in their "100 best Marvel characters" list.
- In 2022, Sportskeeda ranked Jessica Jones 5th in their "Ten best detectives in comics" list.
- In 2022, Bustle ranked Jessica Jones 18th in their "35 Best Female Marvel Characters Who Dominate The MCU & Comics" list.
- In 2022, Nerdist included Jessica Jones in their "8 Awesome Women Detectives in Comics" list.
- In 2022, CBR.com ranked Jessica Jones and Luke Cage 2nd in their "10 Healthiest Marvel Couples" list and 4th in their "10 Best Marvel Couples" list.
- In 2022, Screen Rant included Jessica Jones in their "10 Best Street-Level Heroes In Marvel Comics" list.

== Literary reception ==
=== Volumes ===
==== Alias - 2003 ====
According to Diamond Comic Distributors, Alias #19 was the 63rd best selling comic book in February 2003. Alias #28 was the 73rd best selling comic book in November 2003.

Graeme Mcmillian of Wired stated, "The comic book that introduced Jessica Jones launched Marvel's "R-rated" Max imprint, finally letting fans know that their favorite superheroes did, in fact, know how to swear, they just felt very uncomfortable doing it. Taking full advantage of the freedoms offered by the imprint, creators Brian Michael Bendis and Michael Gaydos created Jones to be one of the company's most well-rounded female characters: flawed, bitter, self-destructive, and far more optimistic than she would ever allow anyone else to see. The roots of Jessica Jones are all here." Guillermo Kurten of Screen Rant ranked the Alias comic book series 5th in their "Brian Michael Bendis' best comic books" list, saying, "Alias was Bendis' gritty run alongside artist Michael Gaydos on superhero-turned-private investigator Jessica Jones. In this series, Jessica Jones was once known as the superhero Jewel but turned away from that life. Alias was praised for its approach as a psychological character study, with the series unraveling pieces of Jessica Jones' past and developing her character as she learns to heal from her trauma."

==== Jessica Jones - 2016 ====
===== Vol. 1 =====
According to Diamond Comic Distributors, Jessica Jones #1 was the 22nd best selling comic book in October 2016.

Jesse Schedeen of IGN gave Jessica Jones #1 a grade of 8.8 out of 10. The issue features Bendis's writing and Gaydos' "heavy black lines and generally moody style," Schedeen writes. "The book has a vague noir quality, but also a humble slice-of-life one as well. This is a series that can showcase the shining heroes of the Marvel Universe and its most ordinary citizens. It's been a long time coming, but Jessica Jones has the solo book she deserves again. ... The fact that so much about Jessica's life has reverted to the old status quo isn't a drawback, but rather one of the book's main selling points." Blair Marnell of Nerdist gave Jessica Jones #1 a grade of 4 out of 5, stating, "It is a lot of fun to see her back in action, even if she doesn't quite have the same edge that she did in her original run. There's some minor swearing in the issue, but it feels a little tame ... If we didn't know that Gaydos drew these pages within the last year, we'd swear that this was a lost story from his original run."

===== Vol. 2 =====
According to Diamond Comic Distributors, Jessica Jones #2 was the 78th best selling comic book in November 2016. Sean Edgar of Paste included the issue in the magazine's "Best Comic Book Covers of November 2016" list.; and Joe Ruggirello of IGN gave Jessica Jones #2 a grade of 8.9 out of 10, asserting, "It just feels right to have the Bendis/Gaydos version of Jessica Jones back ... for a series that seems to pick up right where we left off 12 years ago. ... [T]his new series wouldn't be the same without Michael Gaydos. His rendering of past Luke and Jessica is made poignant by their current state, the passage of time and damage done clearly expressed in their eyes."

==== Jessica Jones - Marvel Digital Original (Jessica Jones: Blind Spot - 2018) ====
According to Diamond Comic Distributors, Jessica Jones - Marvel Digital Original #1 was the 460th best selling graphic novel in 2018.

Chase Magnett of ComicBook.com gave Jessica Jones - Marvel Digital Original #1 a grade of 5 out of 5, saying, "Jessica Jones is in very good hands. This first, surprise issue nails everything that readers have come to want from the character. The dialogue is pitch perfect, taking readers on a tour of the Marvel universe with plenty of small jokes, affectionate exchanges, and banter. There is a great detective story that plays out like a Chandler novel with an excellent added touch of drawing out details with inset panels. Most of all, there is a lot of heart both in Jessica's attitude and the family she has built. There is simply a lot to like about this comic that serves as both an introduction and continuation of one of Marvel's best. What a pleasant surprise."

Jesse Schedeen of IGN included the Jessica Jones - Marvel Digital Original comic book series in their "Top Comics to Buy This Week" list in the week of October 29, 2019, stating, "Jessica Jones is one of the many major new characters Brian Bendis co-created during his long tenure at Marvel, and a heroine in need of a new steward now that Bendis has moved to DC. She found that in Kelly Thompson, the Marvel writer perhaps best suited to continue Jessica's troubled journey. For better or worse, Marvel elected to publish Thompson and Mattia De Lulis' Jessica Jones miniseries in digital-only form earlier this year. Whether it flew under the radar at the time or you simply prefer print to digital, now's your chance to see Jessica flourish under a new creative team."

Sam Stone of CBR.com called the Jessica Jones - Marvel Digital Original comic book series one of the "best Jessica Jones stories," asserting, "Arriving in 2018, Jessica Jones: Blind Spot was a three-issue Marvel Digital series by Kelly Thompson and Mattia De Lulis. This was a new team to take on the character, but they smartly kept the private investigation aspects of her story and added a new look. In this, Jessica investigated a serial killer in New York City killing women with powers. When someone framed Jessica, she went to Doctor Strange for help and the body count began to rise. This kept Jones at her street-level best, telling a hard-boiled detective story."

==== Jessica Jones: Purple Daughter - 2019 ====
According to Diamond Comic Distributors, Jessica Jones: Purple Daughter #1 was the 321st best selling graphic novel in 2019.

Peyton Hinckle of ComicsVerse wrote, "You can't really talk about Jessica Jones: Purple Daughter without talking about the art and, more specifically, the artist. Mattia De Iulis pulls out what might be his best work for this series. Realistic, yet distinctive, Iulis has a style that naturally lends itself to darker comics (like Jessica Jones: Purple Daughter). An artist with heavily stylized linework just wouldn't have given the series the same weight and sense of reality. Part of the reason why we feel like Jessica's life really is falling apart is because she has a relatable face. Iulis' work is so realistic that it almost feels like readers are peaking into Jessica's non-fictitious story. As emotions run high for Jessica, emotions run high for readers as well. The second artist, Filipe Andrade, penciled the fake reality scene, where Jessica briefly thinks she's an idyllic little housewife. Iulis' realistic style definitely wouldn't have worked for this portion of the story. Andrade's heavily stylized linework perfectly emphasizes the distance Jessica has from reality at this point in the plot. This series flew under a lot of comic fans' radar. Since it's an online-only series, it didn't get publicity from LCBS or an array of variant covers. It's not nearly as flashy as most of Marvel's recent publications but, quality wise, it's better. From the storyline to the art, this series excels in almost every way. If you've never read Jessica Jones, Jessica Jones: Purple Daughter is for you…and, honestly, if you've read tons of Jessica Jones' arcs, Jessica Jones: Purple Daughter is still for you. It's what so few comics are nowadays: complex, entertaining, and visually stunning. Don't miss out on it."

Christian Jones of Stardust gave Jessica Jones: Purple Daughter #1 a 9-star rating, saying, "Kelly Thompson expertly establishes the event that has torn Luke and Jessica's lives apart and the ensuing trauma of that. As a reader, you feel the doubt, the anger and the helplessness that these characters feel. As a mother, Jessica is placed in the most horrifying position that a parent can be placed in. Absolute and unconditional love for her child whilst having to face her worst nightmare every time she looks at her baby. Jessica Jones creator Brian Michael Bendis' great talent was humanising his characters, but Thompson has taken it to a whole other level. The artwork by Mattia de Lulis is simply wonderful. There's a photographic realism to his work that suits the story and characters perfectly. The characters are the focus of every panel with the background being less distinct unless it serves the scene. This allows the reader to be really drawn in by the story without becoming distracted by superfluous details. The use of colour, shading, and lighting is also used to the utmost effect, creating a truly convincing piece of neo-noir on the printed page. If Marvel Comics should ever revisit the Noir universe, a Jessica Jones caper set amongst seedy whiskey-soaked, smoke-filled bars in New York's criminal underworld is a must. After Brian Michael Bendis' triumphant run, Kelly Thompson's assured direction of Jessica Jones looks set to flourish. Bendis created a cynical, flawed, world-weary, reluctant superhero. It's exciting to see what facets Thompson will bring to one of Marvel Comics most interesting characters."

==== Jessica Jones: Blind Spot - 2020 ====
According to Diamond Comic Distributors, Jessica Jones: Blind Spot #1 was the 128th best selling comic book in January 2020. Jessica Jones: Blind Spot #2 was the 150th best selling comic book in January 2020.

Grace wright of Screen Rant called Jessica Jones: Blind Spot #1 a "brilliant new take", saying, "While Blind Spot is significant for a number of reasons, Thompson hits on one of the biggest in a letter at the end of the first issue: it's the first time Jessica Jones's original creative team, Bendis and Gaydos, have passed the torch to a new writer and artist in a solo book. Jessica Jones made her first appearance in Alias #1 almost two decades ago, and has been making expletive-filled waves in the Marvel Universe ever since. Jessica has certainly come a long way from her days begging for an audience at the front gates of the Avengers mansion, with her marriage to Luke Cage and the birth of their daughter, Dani Cage. Bendis and Gaydos have seen her through a number of trials and evolutions, but Thompson and De Iulis are ready to grab the character's reins and take her back to... a new sort of origin. Blind Spot successfully gives readers a new insight into Jessica Jones, without trodding on any of the character's development in years past. In fact, before one of Jessica's many haunting decisions reappears, she is more intently focused on her domestic life than any sort of imminent doom. Jessica seems to have grown, picking out the correctly-shaped cereal for her toddler, as opposed to whiskey for herself. While that isn't where Jessica is going to stay, it's a nice acknowledgment of Bendis and Gaydos' work, setting the tone for Thompson and De Iulis as they undertake the mighty feat of forging their own path in Jessica's story."

==== The Variants - 2022 ====
According to Diamond Comic Distributors,The Variants #1 was the 94th best selling comic book in June 2022.

Hannah Rose of CBR.com called The Variants #1 an "intriguing first issue", stating, "Simone captures Jessica's essence well, balancing her hardened if heavy-handed cynicism with her vulnerability and humanity. The sequence where Jess tries on varying shades of lipstick under the watchful eye of the sales clerk is one of the best instances of this softer, more insecure, and human side of the otherwise badass and uncompromising character. Similarly, her more compassionate side is forced out by Daredevil as both hero and attorney, calling on her to assist one of his clients, a girl similarly manipulated by the Purple Man. Jess and Daredevil's relationship here is an uneasy one, their trust in one another is tested thanks to Daredevil's lie-detecting powers, yet the respect between them is plain as day. Powerhouse artist Phil Noto takes the reigns in Variants #1. His line art is elegant, smooth, fluid, and pretty to look at. He sticks to realistic body proportions with just enough stylistic liberty to keep everything easy on the eye and purely in the realm of fiction. He uses a soft, muted color palette with occasional washes of color, especially blue and fuschia. But, for the most part, he keeps things grounded with an appropriately sad, drab beige. Variants #1 demonstrates an excellent understanding of an often underutilized character, exploring her mindset and morals in the aftermath of a harrowing event. Unfortunately, its use of the multiverse leaves viewers wanting more. Time will tell if these different versions of Jessica's character and the alternate worlds they inhabit can be given the attention they deserve."

Jenna Anderson of ComicBook.com gave The Variants #1 a grade of 5 out of 5, asserting, "The Variants #1 is not only a beautifully-constructed new look at the Marvel multiverse that fans know and love, it's a truly stunning and revolutionary new chapter in the ongoing story of Jessica Jones. Gail Simone's script brings the heartfelt, but world-weary tone that Jessica uniquely embodies, while laying the groundwork for a fascinating new twist on doppelgangers from another universe. When coupled with Phil Noto's effortlessly cool and timeless art, The Variants is an absolute knockout for Marvel Comics, and I could not be more excited to see what else it has in store."

== Other versions ==
Multiple versions of Jessica Jones have appeared in Marvel's multiverse.

=== House of M ===
In the 2005 "House of M" storyline, Jones was apparently dating Scott Lang.

=== What If ===
In What If Jessica Jones Had Joined the Avengers?, Jessica Jones accepts Captain America's offer to work for the Avengers. Perceiving that something was amiss with Scarlet Witch, Jones alerts the Avengers before Scarlet Witch can take action, preventing the events of "Avengers Disassembled" and "House of M". Jones goes on to marry Captain America, becoming Jessica Rogers.

In What If Jessica Jones Was Bitten By The Radioactive Spider?, Jones is bitten by the radioactive spider in place of Peter Parker, becoming Spider-Girl. Jones exposes Norman Osborn as the Green Goblin after he murders Jessica's family, leading Osborn to commit suicide and her to quit after the public blames her for his death. Years later, Jones works as a bartender for Luke Cage, but finds the Green Goblin has returned and has begun killing crime bosses to get her attention. Though out of shape, she defeats him with her acid breath and unmasks the new Goblin as Peter, who was attempting to inspire her to become a hero again to revive his career. As Peter is arrested, Jones forms a partnership with beat cop Misty Knight and suggests forming a private detective agency.

=== Ultimate Spider-Man ===
In Ultimate Spider-Man, Jessica Jones appears as a senior student in the school Peter Parker attended. She was the executive producer of the school's television network. She later became jealous of Mary Jane Watson's superior film skills, and attempted to deduce Spider-Man's secret identity for the school newspaper, becoming suspicious of Peter Parker. After the events of Ultimatum, Jones claimed to have abandoned her attempts to figure out who Spider-Man was and instead wanted to focus on his heroics.

=== Spider-Man Loves Mary Jane ===
In Spider-Man Loves Mary Jane, Jones is a student at Mary Jane's high school and was a former friend of Mary Jane until she became a goth. Mary Jane spent more time with Jones after her breakup with Ned Leeds and became more goth-like until Jessica told Mary Jane it did not fit her.

=== Infinity Wars ===
During the events of "Infinity Wars", Gamora used the Infinity Gems to fold the universe in half, resulting in the creation of Warp World, where characters and histories were merged. Jessica Jones was merged with Janice Lincoln and became this universe's version of the Beetle. She is also the fiancé of Scott Banner (an amalgamation of Scott Lang and Bruce Banner).

=== Spider-Man: Life Story ===
In Spider-Man: Life Story, Jessica Jones briefly dated Peter Parker after his split with Mary Jane and helped him track down the elderly Norman Osborn. Much like her Earth-616 counterpart, Jones later founded Alias Investigations.

=== Secret Wars ===
During the "Secret Wars" storyline, several versions of Jessica Jones appear in the domains of Battleworld:

- In the Battleworld domain of Arcadia, Luke Cage and Jones assisted in fighting a horde of zombies from the Deadlands.
- In the Battleworld domain of the Walled City of New York, Cage and Jones are married and live in Harlem.

== In other media ==
=== Television ===
Jessica Jones appears in Marvel's Netflix television series, portrayed by Krysten Ritter as an adult and Elizabeth Cappuccino as a teenager. This version was involved in a childhood car accident that killed her and her parents. After she was revitalized, Jones was adopted by talent agent Dorothy Walker, befriended her adopted sister Trish Walker, and went on to graduate high school years before Peter Parker attended. She possesses superhuman abilities, having been experimented on by Karl Malus after the car accident, and she dedicated herself to being a superheroine.

- Introduced in a self-titled series, as an adult, Jones encountered Kilgrave, who enslaved her for eight months until she broke free after killing Luke Cage's wife Reva Connors on Kilgrave's orders, and opened her own detective agency. During the first season (2015), Jones and Cage form an unlikely partnership to battle Kilgrave.
- Jones appears in The Defenders (2017), in which she and Cage join Matt Murdock / Daredevil and Danny Rand / Iron Fist in founding the eponymous group and combating the Hand.
- In the second (2018) and third (2019) seasons of Jessica Jones, she comes into further conflict with her revealed to be alive mother Alisa, serial killer Gregory Sallinger, and Trish Walker.
- Jones appears in Daredevil: Born Again (2026–present), by which time she has begun raising a daughter, Danielle, with Cage. Despite having grown weaker since Danielle's birth, Jones joins Murdock in combating Wilson Fisk's Anti-Vigilante Task Force (AVTF).

=== Video games ===
- Jessica Jones appears as an unlockable playable character in Marvel Avengers Alliance.
- Jessica Jones appears as an unlockable playable character in Marvel Future Fight.
- Jessica Jones appears as an unlockable playable character in Lego Marvel's Avengers, voiced by Tara Strong.
- Jessica Jones appears in Marvel Avengers Academy, voiced by Michelle Phan.
- Jessica Jones appears as an assist character in Marvel Heroes, voiced again by Tara Strong. This version is a member of the Heroes for Hire.
- Jessica Jones appears in Marvel War of Heroes.
- Jessica Jones appears as an unlockable playable character in Marvel Puzzle Quest.
- Jessica Jones, based on the MCU incarnation, appears as a playable character in Marvel Strike Force. This version is a member of the Defenders and A-Force.
- Jessica Jones appears as an NPC in Marvel Ultimate Alliance 3: The Black Order, voiced again by Tara Strong. This version is a member of the Defenders.
- Jessica Jones appears in Marvel Snap.
