= Rowgir-e Taj Amiri =

Rowgir-e Taj Amiri روگيرتاج اميري
- Village
- Location within Iran
- Coordinates: 27°33′25″N 53°08′39″E
- Country: Iran
- Province: Fars
- County: Lamerd
- Bakhsh: Alamarvdasht
- Rural District: Kheyrgu

Population (2006)
  - Total: 154
- Time zone: UTC+3:30 (IRST)
  - Summer (DST): UTC+4:30 (IRDT)

Rowgir-e Taj Amiri (Persian: روگيرتاج اميري, also Romanized as Rūgīr-e Tāj Amīrī) is a village in Kheyrgu Rural District, Alamarvdasht District, Lamerd County, Fars province, Iran. At the 2006 census, its population was 154, in 28 families.
