= Kheyrgu =

City in Fars province, Iran

Kheyrgu Persian: خيرگو
- City
- Location within Iran
- Coordinates: 27°30′58″N 53°15′01″E
- Country: Iran
- Province: Fars
- County: Lamerd
- District: Kheyrgu

Population (2016)
  - Total: 1,821
- Time zone: UTC+3:30 (IRST)

Kheyrgu (Persian: خيرگو) (Note: Also romanized as Kheyrgū; also known as Khargū) is a city in, and the capital of, Kheyrgu District of Lamerd County, Fars province, Iran. As a village, it was the capital of Kheyrgu Rural District until its capital was transferred to the village of Chahar Taq.

== Demographics ==
=== Population ===
At the time of the 2006 National Census, Kheyrgu's population was 1,051 in 215 households, when it was a village in Kheyrgu Rural District of Alamarvdasht District. The following census in 2011 counted 1,227 people in 315 households. The 2016 census measured the population of the village as 1,821 people in 523 households. It was the most populous village in its rural district.

After the census, the rural district was separated from the district in the formation of Kheyrgu District. Kheyrgu was elevated to the status of a city.
