= Jessica Jones season 1 =

Jessica Jones
- Season 1
- Promotional poster
- Showrunner: Melissa Rosenberg
- Starring: Krysten Ritter; Mike Colter; Rachael Taylor; Wil Traval; Erin Moriarty; Eka Darville; Carrie-Anne Moss; David Tennant
- No. of episodes: 13

Release
- Original network: Netflix
- Original release: November 20, 2015

Season chronology
- Next → Season 2

The first season of the American television series Jessica Jones, which is based on the Marvel Comics character of the same name, follows Jessica Jones, a former superhero who opens her own detective agency after her superhero career comes to an end at the hands of Kilgrave. It is set in the Marvel Cinematic Universe (MCU), sharing continuity with the films and other television series of the franchise. The season was produced by Marvel Television in association with ABC Studios and Tall Girls Productions, with Melissa Rosenberg serving as showrunner.

Krysten Ritter stars as Jones, while David Tennant plays Kilgrave. The two are joined by principal cast members Mike Colter, Rachael Taylor, Wil Traval, Erin Moriarty, Eka Darville, and Carrie-Anne Moss. Jessica Jones entered development in late 2013, with Rosenberg reworking a series she had previously developed for ABC. Ritter was cast as Jones in December 2014, and production took place in New York City from February to August 2015. The season addresses issues of rape and assault, and was always intended to be far more "adult" than other Marvel projects, particularly in terms of sex. The show's cinematography took inspiration from Neo-noir, while visual effects house Shade VFX focused on creating "invisible" effects that would support its realistic approach.

The first two episodes of the season premiered in New York City on November 17, 2015, with the full season of 13 episodes released on Netflix on November 20 to an estimated high viewership and critical acclaim. Critics praised the performances of Ritter and Tennant, as well as the season's noir tone, approach to sexuality, and coverage of darker topics such as rape, assault and posttraumatic stress disorder. The season was awarded a Peabody Award in the category of "Entertainment and Children's programs", and a Hugo Award for short form dramas. A second season of Jessica Jones was ordered on January 17, 2016.

== Episodes ==
No. overall	No. in season	Title	Directed by	Written by	Original release date
1	1	"AKA Ladies Night"	S. J. Clarkson	Melissa Rosenberg	November 20, 2015
Jessica Jones, an alcoholic private investigator "gifted" with superhuman strength, delivers a subpoena to strip club owner Gregory Spheeris for lawyer Jeri Hogarth (who is having an affair with her assistant Pam behind the back of her wife Dr. Wendy Ross-Hogarth), exposing her abilities to him in the process. While not working, Jones spies on Luke Cage, a bar owner who sees her looking into his bar and offers her free alcohol as a "Ladies Night" promotion, leading to the two sleeping together. She leaves upset after seeing a photo of a woman in his bathroom. Jones is approached by Barbara and Bob Shlottman after their daughter Hope began acting differently and disappeared. Jones discovers that Hope is with Kilgrave, a man with mind control abilities who once controlled Jones, leaving her with PTSD, and who she believed was dead. Jones wants to flee, but is convinced by her friend and foster-sister Trish Walker to help Hope. Jones finds Hope and delivers her to her parents, but Kilgrave's hold is still over her, and she murders her parents on his orders. Jones leaves, shaken, but goes back inside, determined to help Hope and take down Kilgrave for good.
2	2	"AKA Crush Syndrome"	S. J. Clarkson	Micah Schraft	November 20, 2015
Jones is investigated by Detective Oscar Clemons, who discovers photos she took of Cage. Jones lies to Cage that she had been hired by the husband of a woman who Cage had slept with. Cage, having not known that the woman was married, confronts the woman about it and breaks things off. She goes to her husband who attacks Cage with a group. Jones arrives and helps fight off the men, and learns that Cage is gifted with super strength and unbreakable skin. Hogarth agrees to represent Hope if Jones can prove that Kilgrave exists and has these powers. Jones remembers leaving Kilgrave to die after he was hit by a bus, and now tracks down the ambulance driver who had picked him up. The driver had been compelled to donate both his kidneys to Kilgrave, and is now on dialysis. Jones finds the operating doctor who anonymously donated the dialysis machine. He agrees to testify for Hope, and reveals that he operated on Kilgrave without anesthesia since that would have blocked Kilgrave's abilities. When Hogarth meets with Hope, the latter reveals that Jones was once under Kilgrave's control as well.
3	3	"AKA It's Called Whiskey"	David Petrarca	Story by : Liz Friedman; Teleplay by : Liz Friedman & Scott Reynolds	November 20, 2015
Jones and Cage bond over their mutual powers, while Jones also tracks down a surgical grade anesthetic to subdue Kilgrave with. Hogarth, now divorcing Wendy (who discovered the affair) and unwilling to risk herself and her reputation despite Kurata's testimony, arranges for Walker to interview Hope about Kilgrave live on her radio talk show. Walker asks that anyone who believes they have been approached or controlled by Kilgrave contact Hogarth, and then publicly insults Kilgrave on air. Angered, Kilgrave sends police sergeant Will Simpson to kill Walker, with Jones having to use the anesthetic on Walker to convince Simpson that she is dead and that he has carried out his orders. Jones follows Simpson back to Kilgrave's hideout, who compels Simpson to walk off a balcony. Jones again convinces Simpson that he has carried out this order by knocking him out and taking him to the street below, telling him as he wakes that he has jumped and she caught him. Searching through the house that Kilgrave was occupying, Jones discovers a room full of recent photographs of her. The woman in the photo in Cage's bathroom is revealed to have been his wife, who, unbeknownst to Cage, was previously murdered by Jones under Kilgrave's orders. Overcome with guilt, Jones breaks things off with Cage.
4	4	"AKA 99 Friends"	David Petrarca	Hilly Hicks Jr.	November 20, 2015
Jones accepts a case from jewelry designer Audrey Eastman who seeks evidence of her husband cheating. Jones tracks Eastman's husband to a rendezvous with his girlfriend only to discover a trap set by Eastman herself, who blames gifted people for the death of her mother during "the incident" (Note: "The incident" refers to the Battle of New York depicted in the film The Avengers (2012).) and who learned of Jones' powers from Spheeris. Angered as she recalls the death of her own parents, Jones convinces the Eastmans to leave her alone with a show of her power and a bluff over the number of other gifted in the city. Hogarth and Jones process a large number of people claiming to have been controlled by Kilgrave, forming a support group for those legitimately affected by him. Simpson attempts to apologize to a frightened Walker over his action while under Kilgrave's control; they eventually bond over the experience. Jones uses surveillance footage provided by Simpson and clues offered by the Kilgrave support group to learn that the photographer spying on her for Kilgrave is her drug addicted neighbor Malcolm Ducasse.
5	5	"AKA The Sandwich Saved Me"	Stephen Surjik	Dana Baratta	November 20, 2015
Jones recalls her brief time as a superhero as she debates whether to save Ducasse or to use him as a means of locating Kilgrave. It is revealed that she first met Kilgrave while saving Ducasse from muggers; he compelled her to go off with him. Walker and Simpson begin a romantic relationship, with Jones allowing him to assist in a plot to capture Kilgrave. Simpson supplies ex-special operations skills and contacts, including access to a hermetically sealed room in which Kilgrave could be kept once the effects of the anesthetic wear off. They follow Ducasse to his daily meeting with Kilgrave where photographs of Jones are exchanged for drugs, which Kilgrave had forced Ducasse to become addicted to so he would obey Kilgrave even after his powers wore off, after around 12 hours of no contact. Simpson shoots Kilgrave with the anesthetic; Jones refuses to let him kill Kilgrave so he can be used to prove Shlottman innocent. Jones gets Kilgrave to Walker and the getaway car, but they are attacked by hired bodyguards who escape with the unconscious Kilgrave. Jones then resolves to help Ducasse overcome his addiction. Kilgrave calls her and promises to leave Ducasse alone in exchange for daily pictures of her; after seeing that Ducasse is serious about getting clean, she begrudgingly accepts the depraved offer.
6	6	"AKA You're a Winner!"	Stephen Surjik	Edward Ricourt	November 20, 2015
Kilgrave uses his powers to win a poker game, and spends his winnings to purchase Jones's childhood home. After paying a fellow inmate to beat her, Shlottman confesses to Jones that she is pregnant with Kilgrave's child and has been trying to miscarry. Jones gives her an abortion pill; Hogarth secretly intends to take the fetal remains. Cage hires Jones to help find the brother of someone, who has evidence on the death of Cage's wife Reva Connors. Connors had left Cage instructions to find a box she had hidden, but it was not there when he looked. Jones recalls Kilgrave having Connors lead them to the box, with Jones digging it up before killing Connors. Jones and Cage find the missing brother, and are given the file of the bus driver that accidentally hit Kilgrave (and who Cage believes hit Connors). Seeing that the driver had been drunk, Cage seeks revenge. Jones intervenes and confesses that Kilgrave forced her to kill Connors. Cage leaves, unable to forgive her for hiding the truth and instigating an intimate relationship with him.
7	7	"AKA Top Shelf Perverts"	Simon Cellan Jones	Jenna Reback & Micah Schraft	November 20, 2015
A drunk Jones, having been asked by Hogarth to convince Wendy to sign divorce papers, accosts Wendy in a subway and almost kills her. Wendy refuses to sign the papers. Ducasse helps Jones back to her apartment, where they find her neighbor Ruben, dead. Knowingly blaming Kilgrave, Jones devises a desperate plan: get herself imprisoned in a supermax prison so when Kilgrave inevitably comes for her, his abilities will be caught on camera. Walker and Simpson have their own plan, with Simpson following Kilgrave's security detail, though he does not tell Walker when he finds them at Jones's old house. Ducasse disposes of Ruben's body, though Jones finds him. Enacting her plan, Jones goes to a police station with Ruben's severed head and confesses to his murder. Her processing is interrupted when Kilgrave takes control of the station and declares his love for Jones, as she was the first person to resist him. He invites her "home", and Simpson later watches as Jones voluntarily enters the house with Kilgrave.
8	8	"AKA WWJD?"	Simon Cellan Jones	Scott Reynolds	November 20, 2015
Jones spends several days living with Kilgrave. Though he takes her phone so she cannot record him, she secretly gets Simpson's when she catches him sneaking into the house to plant a bomb. Not willing to let Kilgrave die until Shlottman is free, Jones tells Kilgrave about the bomb. Kilgrave, in an effort to prove that his nature was forced upon him, shows Jones a pendrive (which Connors had hidden in the box) containing footage of his parents experimenting on him as a child, and him eventually stopping them by his command. Jones shows Kilgrave that he can do good with his powers by convincing him to save several people. She visits Walker and asks whether she should stay with Kilgrave and try to use his abilities to change the world for good. When Jones, knowing that Kilgrave will harm some of his "servants" if she does not return, goes back to Kilgrave, she instead uses a distraction to incapacitate him, and flies away with him. Then, Simpson is seriously injured by his own bomb, which Kilgrave left for him.
9	9	"AKA Sin Bin"	John Dahl	Jamie King & Dana Baratta	November 20, 2015
Walker races Simpson to the hospital, where he insists on seeing a Dr. Miklos Kozlov from his days as an army sergeant. Kozlov gives him some pills, and his injuries heal miraculously. Jones imprisons Kilgrave in the hermetically sealed room, where she plans to torture him until he reveals his abilities on camera. Hogarth warns her that this would forfeit their case in court, and that the D.A. has offered a 20 year plea deal to Shlottman if she pleads guilty. Jones convinces Shlottman to not take the deal, and devises a new plan. From the footage of Kilgrave's experiments, Jones discovers the names of his parents, Louise and Albert Thompson, and from photographs realizes that his mother is a member of the support group. Jones confronts her and Albert, and convinces them to face their son. Jones also forces Clemons to act as a witness. In the cell, Kilgrave is remorseful, but Louise attempts to kill him to stop him from hurting anyone again, and he makes her kill herself. Jones saves Albert from a similar fate, but Kilgrave escapes, with Jones discovering that she is immune to his powers.
10	10	"AKA 1,000 Cuts"	Rosemary Rodriguez	Dana Baratta & Micah Schraft	November 20, 2015
Kilgrave forces Hogarth to take him to a doctor; she goes to Wendy, hoping Kilgrave will force her to sign their divorce papers, but Kilgrave instead orders Wendy to kill Hogarth with a thousand cuts as revenge. Pam arrives, and accidentally kills Wendy to stop her by hitting her in the head with a vase. Thompson reveals that Kilgrave's abilities are a virus that he releases, and that a vaccine could be created from Jones's blood as Jones appears to have become immune to Kilgrave's influence. Simpson, under the influence of Kozlov's drugs (that enhance combat performance and numb pain) arrives at the cell, where Clemons is guarding the evidence needed to imprison Kilgrave. Set on killing Kilgrave instead, Simpson kills Clemons and destroys the evidence. He finds Walker with Thompson, who is unsuccessful in creating the vaccine, but she sends Simpson away when she sees how unstable he is, managing to take some of his pills from him in the process. Kilgrave gets Shlottman released from prison and trades her for his father; Shlottman kills herself, freeing Jones to kill Kilgrave.
11	11	"AKA I've Got the Blues"	Uta Briesewitz	Scott Reynolds & Liz Friedman	November 20, 2015
Jones remembers waking up after a car accident as the sole surviving member of her family and being adopted by the Walkers in a publicity stunt by Trish's abusive adoptive mother, to help bolster Trish's fame as the star of child television program Patsy! Jones discovered her abilities soon after. Now, Jones covers up Shlottman's death and Kilgrave's involvement in it, and begins searching morgues for Thompson's body as a lead. Affected by an increasing lack of sleep, Jones is injured in an accident, but does manage to find Clemons' body and deduces that Simpson killed him rather than Kilgrave. She agrees to meet with Simpson, and he attacks her in her apartment, overpowering the injured Jones. Walker arrives and uses Simpson's pills to help Jones defeat him. Not used to the pills, Walker requires medical attention. As she recovers in the hospital, Kozlov retrieves the unconscious Simpson from Jones's apartment, and Kilgrave warns Jones that he has found Cage; Jones finds Cage herself, in time to see his bar explode with him inside.
12	12	"AKA Take a Bloody Number"	Billy Gierhart	Hilly Hicks Jr.	November 20, 2015
Cage survives the explosion, and reveals to Jones that he was ordered by Kilgrave to destroy his bar. Walker learns that Kozlov works for "IGH", a company that also paid for Jones's medical bills after her childhood car accident, and potentially played a part in her gaining abilities. After Cage recounts the events leading up to the explosion, in which he followed Jones to confront Kilgrave, they realize that Kilgrave is keeping Thompson alive to try and boost his abilities, and may be testing his increasing hold over people. While they investigate, Cage forgives Jones for her role in Connors' death, and the two begin to grow close again. They find a nightclub where Kilgrave tested his enhanced powers, and are confronted by him there. He reveals that he has been controlling Cage the whole time, having made him forgive Jones to earn her trust, and now unleashes Cage on Jones, escaping while they fight. Police soon arrive and are overpowered by Cage, but Jones manages to shoot him in the head with one of their shotguns at point blank range.
13	13	"AKA Smile"	Michael Rymer	Story by : Jamie King & Scott Reynolds; Teleplay by : Scott Reynolds & Melissa Rosenberg	November 20, 2015
With Cage unconscious and requiring medical attention, nurse Claire Temple—who has previous experience treating gifted individuals (Note: As depicted in the first season of Daredevil.)—agrees to look after him while Jones tracks down Kilgrave, who is unsatisfied with Thompson's efforts to increase his abilities so far. Thompson has been using the fetal remains that Hogarth kept, and believes that a full dose of his extracted drug could now make Kilgrave powerful enough to control Jones. Using Cage's phone, Jones tracks Kilgrave to the apartment of a wealthy couple, whom he has enslaved, in time to see Thompson die. Cage awakens, and decides to leave. Jones confronts Kilgrave at the couple's yacht, where he takes Walker hostage. When Jones allows this, Kilgrave believes that he finally has control over her again. However, when he tells her to say "I love you", Jones says it to Walker instead, and snaps Kilgrave's neck. Jones is arrested for the murder, but Hogarth secures her release, leaving her to get calls from people around the city who have heard of her heroics and seek her assistance.

== Cast and characters ==
=== Main ===
- Krysten Ritter as Jessica Jones
- Mike Colter as Luke Cage
- Rachael Taylor as Patricia "Trish" Walker
- Wil Traval as Will Simpson
- Erin Moriarty as Hope Shlottman
- Eka Darville as Malcolm Ducasse
- Carrie-Anne Moss as Jeri Hogarth
- David Tennant as Kilgrave

=== Recurring ===
- Susie Abromeit as Pam
- Robin Weigert as Wendy Ross-Hogarth
- Nichole Yannetty as Nicole
- Kieran Mulcare as Ruben
- Clarke Peters as Oscar Clemons
- Colby Minifie as Robyn
- Danielle Ferland as Clair
- Gillian Glasco as Emma
- Ryan Farrell as Jackson
- Paul Pryce as Donald
- Lisa Emery as Louise Thompson
- Michael Siberry as Albert Thompson

=== Notable guests ===
- Royce Johnson as Brett Mahoney
- Rosario Dawson as Claire Temple

== Production ==
=== Development ===
In October 2013, Marvel Comics and Disney announced that Marvel Television and ABC Studios would provide Netflix with live action series centered around Daredevil, Jessica Jones, Iron Fist, and Luke Cage, leading up to a miniseries based on the Defenders. Melissa Rosenberg was brought on to showrun the Jessica Jones series, to be reconfigured as a "page one do-over" from an original project she had developed in December 2010 for ABC. In December 2014, the official title was revealed to be Marvel's A.K.A. Jessica Jones, but that was shortened to Marvel's Jessica Jones in June 2015. The season consists of 13 hour-long episodes.

=== Writing ===
The writers for the season worked in Los Angeles, with one member of the writing team on set in New York City for filming. Edward Ricourt, a member of Marvel Studios' writer program who had written a Luke Cage film script that had never come to fruition, was brought on to advise the series since it introduced the character. Actress Carrie-Anne Moss talked about how the scripts developed through the production of the season, explaining that the dialogue usually did not change much while filming, but scenes were altered to accommodate the filming locations when necessary. Rosenberg stated that, since Jones is a private investigator, there would be some procedural elements to the show, "but that's not our focus. There are cases. In particular, there is a large case that carries over the season." Elaborating on this, Marvel Television head Jeph Loeb said that the "fun about being a private detective is that the line between what's legal and what's not legal gets very blurred [...] her drive is not always necessarily to solve the case, as much as it is to go, 'Okay, can I pay the rent? How am I going to get through this day?'" He also added that inspiration for the season came from "the noir films from the '40s" and "film[s] like Chinatown."

Describing the tone of the season, Loeb said, "When we first started talking about Daredevil, we promised that we were telling a story that was first a crime drama and then a superhero show. This is more of a psychological thriller. This speaks to when you think about what happened to Jessica and what sort of destroyed her life and how she tried to put it together, and then to have to confront the person who deconstructed her world, that's a very powerful, emotional place to start from." On approaching rape and trauma in the season, Rosenberg wanted to avoid actually showing rape, which she called "lazy storytelling" and often a way to "spice up" male characters, and preferred to just make the trauma a part of the characters' everyday lives rather than an "issue" for the season to tackle. When asked about the adult nature of the season, including the use of sex, Rosenberg explained that Marvel would only not allow showing nudity and the use of the word "fuck" in the season. Regarding all of the social issues the season covered, such as "issues of choice, interracial relationships, domestic violence, [and] issues of consent" while also exploring "feminism and being a woman in this world", Rosenberg said, "It was never our intention going in [to hit a social issue], and I think the minute you intend to do that, you're stepping up on a soap box. If you're digging into the dark side of the human psyche and all the different experiences we go through, and as women we go through, you're going to find those things. If you treat them honestly and with respect, you're also going to hit social issues."

=== Casting ===
The main cast for the season includes Krysten Ritter as Jessica Jones, Mike Colter as Luke Cage, Rachael Taylor as Patricia "Trish" Walker, Wil Traval as Will Simpson, Erin Moriarty as Hope Shlottman, Eka Darville as Malcolm Ducasse, Carrie-Anne Moss as Jeri Hogarth, and David Tennant as Kilgrave.

Appearing in recurring roles for the season are Susie Abromeit as Pam, Colby Minifie and Kieran Mulcare as Robyn and Ruben, Nichole Yannetty as Nicole, Clarke Peters as Oscar Clemons, Michael Siberry and Lisa Emery as Albert and Louise Thompson, and Robin Weigert as Wendy Ross-Hogarth. Danielle Ferland, Gillian Glasco, Ryan Farrell, and Paul Pryce also recur as victims of Kilgrave who join a support group established by Jones, while Rosario Dawson and Royce Johnson reprise their roles of Claire Temple and Brett Mahoney, respectively, from Daredevil.

=== Design ===
Stephanie Maslansky returned as the costume designer for Jessica Jones from Daredevil, and was assisted on the first episode by Jenn Rogien, who crafted Jessica Jones' leather jacket, faded jeans, and boots costume. On Jones's costume, Maslansky said she "considers her clothing to be an armor and a shield and something that helps her maintain a distance from other people and privacy. It keeps her from having to deal with the rest of humanity in a certain sort of way." At least 10 versions of Jones's jacket were made, which started as an Acne Studios leather motorcycle jacket that had any "bells and whistles and any additional superfluous design details" removed. 20 pairs of jeans were used, with both sets of clothing being aged and distressed.

Because Jones's costume does not evolve much throughout the season, Maslansky used flashbacks to show how her costume had evolved to the present day: for "pre-Kilgrave" Jessica Jones, Maslansky gave the character "more pulled together" clothes, albeit "still kind of edgy" clothes that did not change who she was as a character, but were just "different". For instance, in a flashback to Jones working in a corporate environment, she does not wear a suit, instead "wear[s] her jeans and find[s] a really cool jacket, maybe a vintage thing, maybe something that she borrowed from Trish". For a flashback where Jones wears a large sandwich costume, a "variety" of costumes were ordered online, with the chosen suit then distressed to "look dirty and old"; "a mere shadow of its former sandwich self," becoming "more of a hoagie than a sandwich." In another flashback, Jones imagines escaping Kilgrave's control. The bright yellow dress the character wears in the dream sequence was chosen for its juxtaposition to the character's real situation, with Maslansky calling it "so beautiful and so free and so light". In a third flashback, Walker presents Jones with a potential vigilante costume—a white and turquoise jumpsuit with a dark purple "diamond" symbol at the waist, which is reminiscent of Jones' Jewel costume in the comics—but she rejects it.

For Kilgrave, Maslansky used many suits created by designer Paul Smith, rather than custom-making them as she originally planned, as Smith "was all about purple" in the previous fashion season. On the suits, Maslansky added that the designers "wanted to find a place where we could utilize clothing in shades of purple, but not go so over the top that it would look silly and that he would stop feeling ominous or menacing." Expanding on this, Maslansky called purple a traditionally "fairly friendly color, and he's anything but friendly. So I had to find ways to make him be ominous and frightening and terrifying. I found that I needed the right proportion of shades of purple to other shades that were similar: navy, black, maroon." Maslansky felt Luke Cage was also someone "who wears his clothing like an armor," with his wardrobe consisting of T-shirts, jeans, leather jackets or an army jacket. For a character like Trish Walker, who does not have the same kind of "statement costume" as Jones, Maslansky tried to create a certain character style. Maslansky said that Walker's uniform is fashion, so "even when she was hanging around the house, she was wearing a pair of rag & bone jeans with a Chloé top, and this was her version of a T-shirt and jeans." Maslansky added that Robin was "a blast to dress" because of her "quirky" personality, yet she was still able to "put herself together aesthetically." For Malcolm, as his story progressively became brighter throughout the season, so did his wardrobe, becoming "a little brighter and a little more hopeful."

=== Filming ===
In February 2014, Marvel announced that Jessica Jones would be filmed in New York City. In April, Marvel Comics' editor-in-chief Joe Quesada stated that the show would be filming in areas of Brooklyn and Long Island City that still look like the old Hell's Kitchen, in addition to sound stage work. The season went into production in February 2015 in the Bronx at Lehman College with the working title Violet and aimed to film each episode over nine days, on average. Filming concluded in mid- to late August. Other filming locations in New York City used included the East Village's Horseshoe Bar for Luke's Bar; the 33rd Street PATH station and a PATH train; the 101st Street area for the exterior of Jessica's apartment (with the interior apartment settings created on a sound stage); Douglaston, Queens for Jessica's childhood home; the Angel Orensanz Center for Jessica and Luke's fight in "AKA Take a Bloody Number"; Williamsburgh Savings Bank Tower and Pier 88 for locations in "AKA Smile"; the Meatpacking District; Nolita; near the 39th Street entrance to the Lincoln Tunnel; Tribeca; Bryant Park; Union Square; Gramercy Park; Greenpoint, Brooklyn, near the Newtown Creek Wastewater Treatment Plant; Long Island City, including the Allied Extruder Factory for the weed-growing facility, with exteriors shots taken from near Calvary Cemetery; the Queensboro Bridge on the Queens side; the Manhattan Bridge; the Brooklyn Navy Yard; Bethesda Terrace and Fountain in Central Park; and Industry City.

Concerning inspirations on the season, Loeb revealed that "Chinatown [...] is one of the things that influenced Brian Michael Bendis and Michael Gaydos when they created the character. So those kind of beautiful, long, wide expansive shots, where people sort of come into frame and go back out of frame and someone's in the foreground and then someone is way in the background and they're having a conversation, that's the stuff that makes it interesting." Director of photography Manuel Billeter and episodic director S. J. Clarkson took inspiration from the comics in terms of their color palette while looking to the works of Wong Kar-wai as reference to create "unconventional" compositions, with Billeter explaining, "There were a lot of foreground elements [and] headroom as well, and we never wanted to show an open frame. We wanted to create a sense of claustrophobia." Billeter shot the season with a Red Epic Dragon camera in 4K resolution, with 5K used for some visual effects shots, and with Panavision PVintage lenses; he focused mostly on static frames and "good composition" but did occasionally employ a camera dolly or steadicam. For lighting, Billeter noted that many New York street lamps had been changed from sodium-vapor lamps to LEDs, so he tried to recreate the "warm, dirty color of sodium vapor" for night exterior scenes.

Production designer Loren Weeks described Marvel's Hell's Kitchen as having "a little more [East] Village quality". To achieve the explosion at Luke's Bar, Weeks said, "We could not take out the windows [at Horseshoe Bar], which are [made up of] multiple small colored glass and metal frames. We didn't know frankly when we picked that location that we would have that explosion... What we did was build a fireproof box in the entrance and we had a cannon in there which blew out debris and smoke and some fire. And then we did a lighting effect on the inside and then the rest of the explosion was handled by visual effects." For the scenes on the PATH train and station, location manager Jason Farrar noted that production had exclusive use of the tracks and platform during the day when ridership was low to get their shots.

=== Visual effects ===
Shade VFX created over 600 effects shots for the season, with "invisible" effects "the showpiece, helping to push forward the darker elements the series." Therefore, effects supervisor Karl Coyner and producer Julie Long worked closely with the crew on set to "execute stunts, set extensions, explosions, wetwork and fire sequences" while filming, rather than have Shade create those effects digitally. An effect that Shade was required to create was tinting Kilgrave's skin purple "in a few key scenes" where he is using his powers, a nod to the comic iteration's purple-skinned appearance.

=== Music ===
At the 2015 San Diego Comic-Con, Sean Callery revealed he was composing music for Jessica Jones, eventually stating that the music required for each episode ranged from 9 to 20 minutes, totaling approximately 415 minutes of music for the season. A soundtrack album for the season was released by Marvel Music digitally on June 3, 2016.

All music composed by Sean Callery, unless otherwise noted.

Jessica Jones (Original Soundtrack)
No.	Title	Music	Length
1.	"Jessica Jones Main Title"		1:09
2.	"Then There's the Matter of You"		1:18
3.	"Fire Escape Night Shift"		4:16
4.	"Alias Investigations"		2:28
5.	"Fight at Luke's Bar"		2:21
6.	"Nurse Jessica"		2:13
7.	"Rescuing Hope from the Hotel Bed"		3:50
8.	"Kidnapping Kilgrave"		3:20
9.	"Sleepover at Luke's"		3:03
10.	"Jessica on the Move"		2:44
11.	"Cockroach"		3:09
12.	"Luke's Revenge on the Bus Driver"	Sean Callery & Jamie Forsyth	2:31
13.	"Elevator Massacre"		2:52
14.	"Looking for Kilgrave–Bus Accident Vision"		1:56
15.	"Hospital Cat and Mouse"		3:11
16.	"Gift from Trish"		2:55
17.	"Kilgrave Escapes His Glass Prison"		1:41
18.	"Tailing Malcolm"		2:22
19.	"Jessica Confesses to Luke"	Sean Callery & Jamie Forsyth	2:58
20.	"Restaurant Flashback"		1:48
21.	"Jones–Cage Match"	Sean Callery & Jamie Forsyth	2:58
22.	"Final Justice for the Purple Man"		2:33
23.	"Maybe It's Enough the World Thinks I'm a Hero"		2:17
Total length:			59:53

=== Marvel Cinematic Universe tie-ins ===
On existing in the MCU, specifically in the same world as the other Netflix series, Rosenberg said, "Jessica Jones is a very, very different show than Daredevil. We exist in a cinematic universe, [and] the mythology of the universe is connected, but they look very different, tonally they're very different... That was my one concern coming in: Am I going to have to fit into Daredevil or what's come before? And the answer is no." On references or "easter eggs" in the season, Rosenberg explained that "A little is always there and in the writer's room we have some fanboys that know all this stuff and they're all geeking out with different stuff [...] a lot of references are to the [Alias comic]." She also said that nods to the larger MCU are in the season, with each episode having a "little something in it."

Jeryn Hogarth is closely associated with Iron Fist in the comics, and also worked with Luke Cage as part of those characters' Heroes for Hire team. Like Daredevil, the season makes references to the events of The Avengers and the Avengers (specifically Hulk and Captain America, though not by name). Jessica also mentions Angela del Toro as another private investigator, who in the comics is the hero White Tiger and has connections with K'un-Lun and Iron Fist. Paul Tassi, writing for Forbes, was disappointed with how the season fit into the larger MCU, feeling the season seemed "removed from the world of The Avengers" and did not acknowledge Daredevil enough given that "it's supposed to be sharing at least this little corner of the Marvel Cinematic Universe with it." Eric Francisco of Inverse countered that Jessica Jones's lack of overt connections to the MCU was "the show's chief advantage. Besides demonstrating how physically wide open the MCU's scope really is, Jessica Jones also proves the MCU's thematic durability."

== Marketing ==
In May 2015, Marvel announced plans to reprint Alias, the comic that the series is based on, with new covers from David Mack, the original cover artist on the comic who is also providing artwork for the series' opening credits. The reprints, which were all released digitally in June 2015, and up to issue 15 in two trade paperbacks in September, were intended to both celebrate the history of Jessica Jones, and introduce new audiences to the character ahead of the release of the season. In late September through early October, Marvel and Netflix released short teasers for the season, which chronicled a day of Jones' life. Also in early October, Marvel digitally released a 12-page one-shot comic by the original Alias creative team—Bendis, Gaydos, and Mack titled Marvel's Jessica Jones—set in the universe of the television series. The one-shot was created as an exclusive for New York Comic Con, where a print version was distributed. The comic sees Jessica Jones coming into contact with Daredevil character Turk Barrett, and includes a short sequence featuring Daredevil, to celebrate "the connective tissue that will build between the series." Also during New York Comic Con, Marvel set up a street marketing campaign, and screened "AKA Ladies Night" on October 10, while at the Marvel Booth fans could take their picture with the Alias Investigations desk, with Kilgrave's eyes appearing in the background of the final animation. Marvel additionally partnered with Uber during the event to provide select riders with complimentary trips to or from the convention in custom designed SUVs.

A full trailer was released at the end of October, with Meagan Damore of Comic Book Resources feeling that it helped establish the same tone as Daredevil and introduced "Marvel's creepiest villain yet" with Kilgrave. She also compared Jessica to some of the other female characters of the MCU—Black Widow, Melinda May, and Peggy Carter—feeling that Jessica stood out from the others because she does not have "a sense of togetherness" and was the most relatable because of her struggle with trauma, and that the season would have the amount of creative space required to explore the character that the other female characters were lacking. A second trailer was released on November 10, 2015. Sarene Leeds of The Wall Street Journal felt that this trailer highlighted empowerment, compared to the first that "was about illustrating the fear behind Jones's past". The season held its premiere in New York City on November 17.

== Release ==
=== Streaming ===
The first season of Jessica Jones was released on November 20, 2015, on the streaming service Netflix, in all territories where it is available, in Ultra HD 4K. In January 2015, a month after Marvel announced a 2015 release for the season, Ted Sarandos had said that it was "too hard to say now" if the season would actually release in 2015, with Netflix's plan to release a Marvel series approximately a year apart from each other after Daredevil's April 2015 release. However, Netflix soon confirmed that the season would indeed release in 2015, announcing the November 20 release date in September. The season was enhanced to be available in high-dynamic-range video (HDR) after its initial release by post-production vendor Deluxe.

The season, along with the additional Jessica Jones seasons and the other Marvel Netflix series, was removed from Netflix on March 1, 2022, due to Netflix's license for the series ending and Disney regaining the rights. The season became available on Disney+ in the United States, Canada, United Kingdom, Ireland, Australia, and New Zealand on March 16, ahead of its debut in Disney+'s other markets by the end of 2022.

=== Home media ===
The season was released on DVD in Region 1 and Blu-ray in Region A on August 22, 2017, in Region 2 and Region B on December 5, 2016, and in Region 4 on December 7, 2016.

== Reception ==
=== Audience viewership ===
As Netflix does not reveal subscriber viewership numbers for any of their original series, Symphony Technology Group compiled data for the season based on a sample size of 15,000 people using software on their phones that measures television viewing by detecting a program's sound. According to Symphony, from September to December 2015, episodes of Jessica Jones averaged 4.8 million viewers during a 35-day viewing cycle. The data was presented by Alan Wurtzel, NBCUniversal president of research and media development, in a presentation aimed to provide "perspective" when stating "digital platforms are hurting the traditional TV business". Netflix CCO Ted Sarandos responded to the data by saying that "the whole methodology and the measurement and the data itself doesn't reflect any sense of reality of anything that we keep track of." A further study from Symphony, for the same time period, found Jessica Jones to be one of the four most watched series in the 18 to 24 demographic, ahead of any broadcast network series. The marketing analytics firm Jumpshot determined the season was the fifth-most viewed Netflix season in the first 30 days after it premiered, garnering 26% of the viewers that the second season of Daredevil received, which was the most viewed season according to Jumpshot. Jumpshot, which "analyzes click-stream data from an online panel of more than 100 million consumers", looked at the viewing behavior and activity of the company's U.S. members, factoring in the relative number of U.S. Netflix viewers who watched at least one episode of the season.

=== Critical response ===
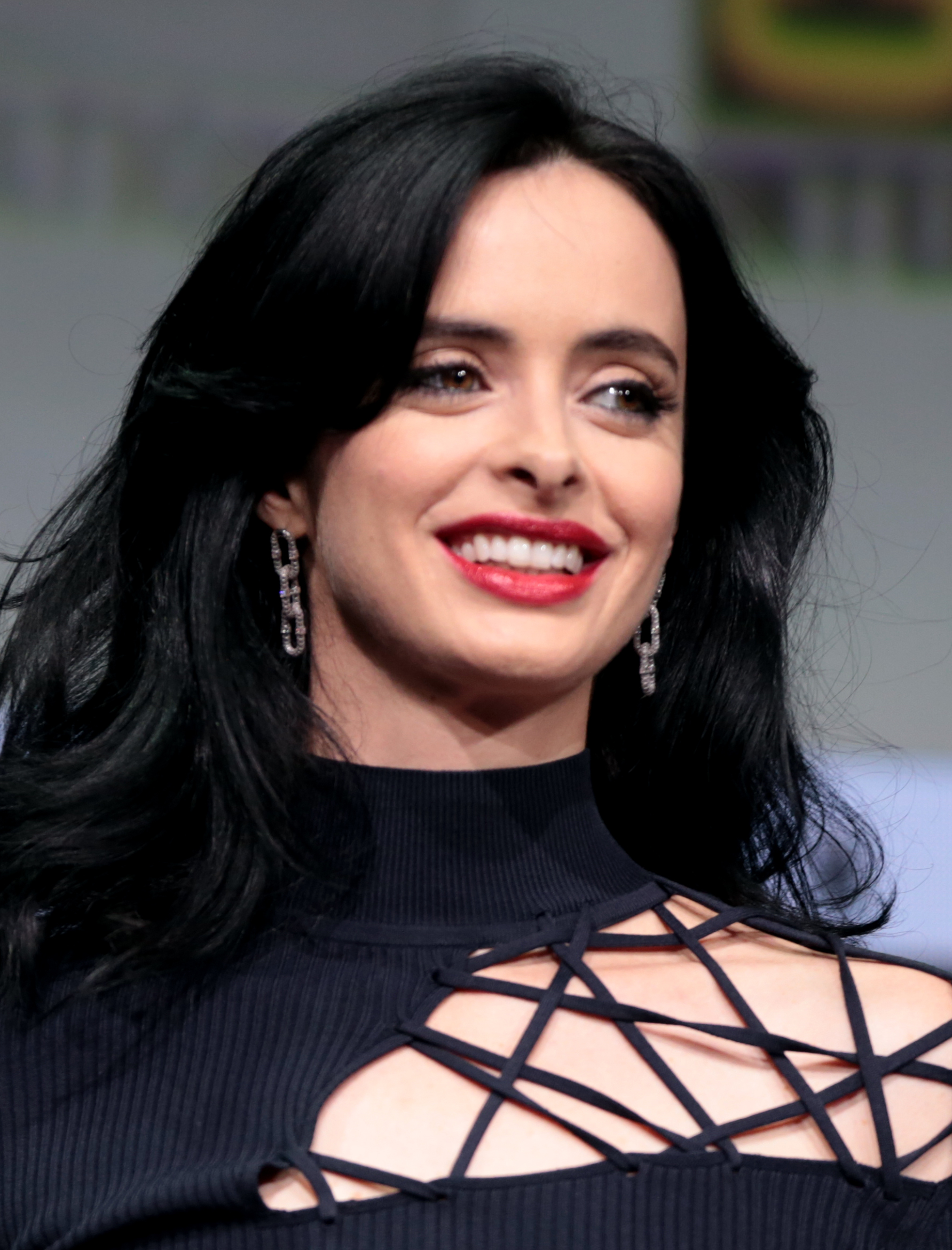
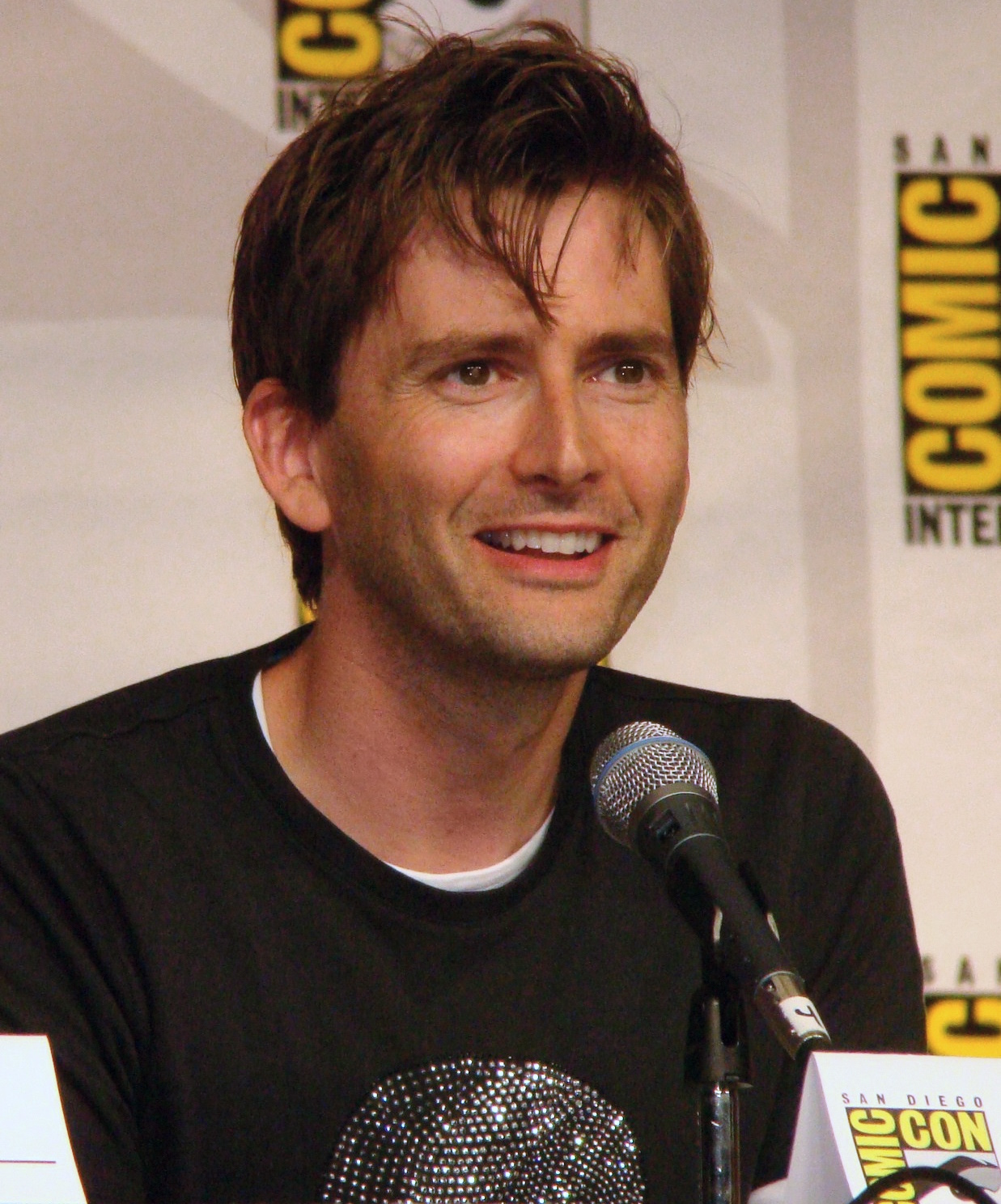
Krysten Ritter (left) and David Tennant (right) received near universal praise for their portrayals of Jessica Jones and Kilgrave, respectively, with Ritter able to "display her impressive range" to give "an exceptional performance", and Tennant being called "a horrific joy to behold".

The review aggregator website Rotten Tomatoes reported a 94% approval rating with an average rating of 8.20/10 based on 80 reviews. The website's critical consensus reads, "Jessica Jones builds a multifaceted drama around its engaging antihero, delivering what might be Marvel's strongest TV franchise to date." Metacritic, which uses a weighted average, assigned a score of 81 out of 100 based on 32 critics, indicating what the website considers to be "universal acclaim".

The early screening of the first episode at New York Comic Con was met by a very positive reaction from the crowd. George Marston of Newsarama gave the first episode a 10 out of 10, saying the season "strikes a balance between self-aware noir and Marvel's first flirtations with psychological horror....not just another hit for Marvel and Netflix, but a landmark moment for female superheroes on TV." Eric Goldman of IGN felt that "Jessica Jones starts out with a strong premiere episode that [...] easily goes further than anything in the MCU in terms of sexuality." He called Ritter "a commendably tough, sardonic" Jessica Jones and praised the supporting cast for the strong impressions they made, later scoring the episode an 8.5 out of 10. Evan Valentine of Collider gave the episode 5 stars out of 5, feeling that Tennant would "ascend to the same level as Tom Hiddleston's Loki and Vincent D'Onofrio's Wilson Fisk as one of the cornerstones of villainy in the MCU". Katharine Trendacosta of io9 also had positive thoughts on "AKA Ladies Night", highlighting the episode's use of light and color, especially with purple, and the way it portrays New York as how it "actually looks—not overly bright and shiny and clean, but not suffering a never-ending power-outage either". Abraham Riesman noted the episode's presentation of sexuality, which "was shockingly and refreshingly honest", compared to Marvel's other films and television series. He concluded by applauding the season's bringing up of the topics of rape and PTSD.

Reviewing the first seven episodes of the season, Maureen Ryan of Variety gave positive thoughts on Jessica Jones, stating, "The show, which features an exceptional performance from Krysten Ritter and sure-handed guidance from executive producer Melissa Rosenberg, is not just a contender for the title Best Marvel-related TV property; in a supremely crowded TV scene, it is one of the year's most distinctive new dramas." Jack Shepard of The Independent, also on the first seven episodes, felt the season "not only matches [Daredevil] but exceeds expectations." Shepard gave exceptional praise to Tennant's Kilgrave, feeling he was one of the best villains produced by Marvel, and possibly "the best on-screen comic book villain since Heath Ledger's Joker." Forbes' Merrill Barr stated that after seeing the first seven episodes, "the answer is a resounding yes" if lightning could strike twice for Marvel Television, claiming, "In no uncertain terms, Jessica Jones is the best thing Marvel Television has ever produced. It contains all the hopeful anticipation of [Agents of ] S.H.I.E.L.D., all the feminist-overtones of Agent Carter and all the grittiness of Daredevil."

Deadline Hollywood's Dominic Patten also had praise for the season, particularly Rosenberg's influence on it, the coverage of topics such as "PTSD, abuse, assault, shame, and death" and the cast, highlighting Tennant's Kilgrave as the actor's best role as well as the MCU's best villain. Mary McNamara from the Los Angeles Times felt Jessica Jones "rewrote the definition of superhuman" and was "a marvel", lauding the season's "breathtaking" examination of recovery from a sexually, emotionally and physically abusive relationship. Daniel Fienberg for The Hollywood Reporter was also positive, saying the season "looks and feels a bit like a cable anti-hero series—but it's really more of a post-hero story, making it fascinating and unique in a marketplace that doesn't lack for costumed do-gooders of all types." His one criticism was that "the show shares Jessica's monomaniacal fixation on [Kilgrave] and the result is a sort of narrative claustrophobia [...] Everything in these opening episodes ties back to Kilgrave and Kilgrave is such a twisted figure that it's hard for any light to get in." Melissa Maerz of Entertainment Weekly was slightly more critical of the season, awarding it a "B". Though Maerz felt Ritter was a good choice for Jessica and enjoyed the cinematography, she felt the season "could've made for a gritty character drama if it weren't for the noir clichés (saxophone music, shadows through glass) and a procedural structure that's very CSI: Marvel. The show's biggest weakness is the same as Jessica's: It starts out with extraordinary potential, but somewhere along the way, it loses what make it special."

Goldman, later reviewing the whole season, gave it a 9.3 out of 10. He commended all the actors, the relationship between Jessica and Trish, and the episode "Sin Bin", though was critical of the character Robyn. Additionally, Goldman also felt the season spent "too many scenes devoted to Jeri's marital strife" and that it hit its peak "a bit before the actual end of the season" similar to Daredevil, with most of the thrilling moments earlier in the season.

=== Analysis ===
Libby Hill of the Los Angeles Times commented on how Jessica Jones exposed modern day sexism and misogyny through Kilgrave's use of the phrase "Smile", calling the season "the most innocuous and incisive cultural critique" from Marvel to date. Hill likened an early scene that shows Kilgrave asking Jones to smile, and her obliging, to "similar well-meaning scenarios [that] play out in the real world time and again each day" many in the form of gendered street harassment, that resonates with many women. Hill also added that "Kilgrave serves as an exaggerated representation of perceived consent," due to the response he gives later in the season to Jessica about never knowing if someone is doing what they want or what he tells them to do. She concludes that "Jessica Jones is revolutionary because in acknowledging casual misogyny and exaggerating its most destructive tendencies, it exposes the pervasive toxicity therein. It does all of this without making a show of its politics, instead resting easy on the knowledge that all too many women will relate to the subtleties of its premise." Amy C. Chambers, writing for The Science and Entertainment Laboratory, noted how the season moved away from sexism even more so than the comics, by changing Kilgrave's abilities from pheromone-based, with a particular effect on women, to viral, with equal effect no matter gender, indicating that "powerlessness is not gendered."

Kwame Opam at The Verge chose to examine rape and the nature of consent in the season. Comparing Jessica Jones to other television series that have depicted rape (Game of Thrones, Orange Is the New Black, and Outlander), Opam felt that "since rape is one of the show's core themes, we never need to see it [...] rape is a foundational part of the text, and its presence is constant. Even if it's invisible, it's always there." He also felt the season took the time to examine how rape happens and what it means, especially in terms of power and consent, concluding, "Jessica Jones moves the conversation about rape forward by treating it as a complex subject worth investigating, rather than as spice for a story [...] Maybe we don't need to see it anymore to grasp how violent it is. Maybe our energies are better spent thinking deeply about why it happens at all." The Guardian's Lili Loofbourow also discussed the season's depiction of rape and consent, noting the complications that come with Kilgrave telling his victims how to feel rather than just how to act, and saying, "however exceptional Kilgrave's power seems, the moral quagmire it produces is all too common. It's the condition of the rape victim who had an orgasm during her assault. It's the condition of the soldier trained to kill when he suspects his targets are innocent. It's the condition of the battered woman who goes back to her abuser and stays "of her own free will". It's the condition of...any person, really, who agrees, whatever the context, to consent to forgo consent in the future." Loofbourow also discussed the character of Simpson, comparing his power-inducing red pill to the anti-feminist "red pillers", and noting that his taking of the pills "renders him not just dangerously delusional, but so utterly at odds with nature and reality of any kind that he will forget to breathe unless he counteracts the pill's effects."

=== Accolades ===
Jessica Jones was included on multiple Best and Top TV shows of 2015 lists, ranking on People's (1st, along with Daredevil), Indiewire and The Star-Ledger's (2nd), NPR's (3rd), ScreenCrush's (4th), Digital Spy's (5th), Complex's (6th), Vulture's (7th), Slate's (9th), and TV Guide's (11th). It was also included on un-ranked lists from Maureen Ryan of Variety, Mary McNamara of the Los Angeles Times, The Week, and Wired. In December 2015, IGN named Jessica Jones the Netflix's best original series released to date, and it was named one of the Best New Shows of 2015 by Ryan, as well as the tenth best new show of 2015 by Entertainment Weekly's Jeff Jensen. The Atlantic named "AKA WWJD?" one of the best television episodes of 2015. Additionally, Jessica Jones was the second most trending television series search on Google for 2015.

Year	Award	Category	Nominee(s)	Result	Ref.
2016	Critics' Choice Awards	Best Actress in a Drama Series	Krysten Ritter	Nominated	
2016	Dorian Awards	TV Performance of the Year – Actress	Krysten Ritter	Nominated	
2016	Empire Awards	Best TV Series	Jessica Jones	Nominated	
2016	Glamour Awards	International TV Actress	Krysten Ritter	Won	
2016	Gotham Awards	Breakthrough Series – Long Form	Jessica Jones	Nominated	
2016	Hugo Awards	Best Dramatic Presentation, Short Form	"AKA Smile"	Won	
2016	Nebula Awards	Ray Bradbury Award for Outstanding Dramatic Presentation	Scott Reynolds, Melissa Rosenberg, and Jamie King (for "AKA Smile")	Nominated	
2016	Online Film & Television Association Award	Best New Theme Song in a Series	Sean Callery	Nominated	
2016	Online Film & Television Association Award	Best New Titles Sequence	Jessica Jones	Nominated	
2016	Peabody Awards	Entertainment and Children's programs	Jessica Jones	Won	
2016	People's Choice Awards	Favorite Sci-Fi/Fantasy TV Actor	David Tennant	Nominated	
2016	Primetime Creative Arts Emmy Awards	Outstanding Main Title Design	Jessica Jones	Nominated	
2016	Primetime Creative Arts Emmy Awards	Outstanding Main Title Theme Music	Sean Callery	Won	
2016	Webby Awards	Special Achievement: Best Actress	Krysten Ritter	Won	
2016	Saturn Awards	Best Actress on Television	Krysten Ritter	Nominated	
2016	Saturn Awards	Best New Media Television Series	Jessica Jones	Nominated	
2016	Saturn Awards	Best Supporting Actor on Television	David Tennant	Nominated	
2016	TCA Awards	Outstanding New Program	Jessica Jones	Nominated	
