= Shah Bahram, Fars =

Shah Bahram شاه بهرام
- Village
- Location within Iran
- Coordinates: 27°32′15″N 53°12′37″E
- Country: Iran
- Province: Fars
- County: Lamerd
- Bakhsh: Alamarvdasht
- Rural District: Kheyrgu

Population (2006)
  - Total: 124
- Time zone: UTC+3:30 (IRST)
  - Summer (DST): UTC+4:30 (IRDT)

Shah Bahram (Persian: شاه بهرام, also Romanized as Shāh Bahrām; also known as Shāh Barān and Showrūn) is a village in Kheyrgu Rural District, Alamarvdasht District, Lamerd County, Fars province, Iran. At the 2006 census, its population was 124, in 27 families.
