= Rowgir-e Qaleh Hajji =

Rowgir-e Qaleh Hajji روگيرقلعه حاجي
- Village
- Location within Iran
- Coordinates: 27°33′09″N 53°09′48″E
- Country: Iran
- Province: Fars
- County: Lamerd
- Bakhsh: Alamarvdasht
- Rural District: Kheyrgu

Population (2006)
  - Total: 173
- Time zone: UTC+3:30 (IRST)
  - Summer (DST): UTC+4:30 (IRDT)

Rowgir-e Qaleh Hajji (Persian: روگيرقلعه حاجي, also Romanized as Rūgīr-e Qal‘eh Ḩājjī; also known as Rūgīr-e Qal‘eh 'ājjī) is a village in Kheyrgu Rural District, Alamarvdasht District, Lamerd County, Fars province, Iran. During the 2006 census, its population was 173, in 41 families.
