= Rowgir-e Hasani =

Rowgir-e Hasani روگيرحسني
- Village
- Location within Iran
- Coordinates: 27°32′25″N 53°11′32″E
- Country: Iran
- Province: Fars
- County: Lamerd
- Bakhsh: Alamarvdasht
- Rural District: Kheyrgu

Population (2006)
  - Total: 281
- Time zone: UTC+3:30 (IRST)
  - Summer (DST): UTC+4:30 (IRDT)

Rowgir-e Hasani (Persian: روگيرحسني, also Romanized as Rūgīr-e Ḩasanī; also known as Rūgīr-e 'asanī) is a village in Kheyrgu Rural District, Alamarvdasht District, Lamerd County, Fars province, Iran. At the 2006 census, its population was 281, in 64 families.
