= Rowgir-e Hajji Mohammad Taqi =

Village in Fars, Iran

Rowgir-e Hajji Mohammad Taqi روگيرحاجي محمدتقي
- Village
- Location within Iran
- Coordinates: 27°33′22″N 53°09′27″E
- Country: Iran
- Province: Fars
- County: Lamerd
- Bakhsh: Alamarvdasht
- Rural District: Kheyrgu

Population (2006)
  - Total: 199
- Time zone: UTC+3:30 (IRST)
  - Summer (DST): UTC+4:30 (IRDT)

Rowgir-e Hajji Mohammad Taqi (Persian: روگيرحاجي محمدتقي, also Romanized as Rūgīr-e Ḩājjī Moḩammad Taqī; also known as Rowgir-e Rashidi) is a village in Kheyrgu Rural District, Alamarvdasht District, Lamerd County, Fars province, Iran. At the 2006 census, its population was 199, in 44 families.
