= Michael Gaydos =

American comics artist

- Area: Artist

Michael Gaydos is an American comics artist.

== Career ==
At Marvel Comics he has worked with Brian Michael Bendis on Alias, the last storyline of its follow up, The Pulse, and the current sequel comic, Jessica Jones. He has also illustrated the mini-series Powerless and Daredevil Redemption.

Gaydos' DC Comics work includes the series Manhunter (Vol. 3), issues 31–38, and Pearl, which reunited him with Brian Michael Bendis.

His work outside the Big Two include illustrating Virgin Comics' Snake Woman, a story for Fox Atomic Comics’ original graphic novel, The Nightmare Factory, and a Devlin Waugh story for 2000 AD.

=== Television ===
On February 21, 2024, Gaydos and Bendis were announced as executive producers on the television series adaptation of Pearl for Amazon Prime Video.
