= Kheyrgu District =

District in Fars province, Iran

Kheyrgu District Persian: بخش خیرگو
- District
- Location within Iran
- Coordinates: 27°32′59″N 53°13′35″E
- Country: Iran
- Province: Fars
- County: Lamerd
- Capital: Kheyrgu
- Time zone: UTC+3:30 (IRST)

Kheyrgu District (Persian: بخش خیرگو) is in Lamerd County, Fars province, Iran. Its capital is the city of Kheyrgu, whose population at the time of the 2016 National Census was 1,821 people in 523 households.

== History ==
After the 2016 census, Kheyrgu Rural District was separated from Alamarvdasht District in the formation of Kheyrgu District. The village of Kheyrgu was elevated to the status of a city.

== Demographics ==
=== Administrative divisions ===
Kheyrgu District
Administrative Divisions
Kamali RD
Kheyrgu RD
Kheyrgu (city) (Note: Became a city after the 2016 census)
RD = Rural District
