= The Pulse (comics) =

Comic book series published by Marvel Comics

- The cover for The Pulse #14, the final issue.

Publication information
- Publisher: Marvel Comics
- Schedule: Bimonthly
- Publication date: April 2004 – May 2006
- No. of issues: 14; The Pulse Special Edition #1
- Main character(s): Jessica Jones; Ben Urich; Kat Farrell; Luke Cage; J. Jonah Jameson; Joseph "Robbie" Robertson

Creative team
- Created by: Brian Michael Bendis
- Written by: Brian Michael Bendis
- Artist(s): Brent Anderson (Issues 6 to 7); Michael Lark (Issues 8 to 10); Michael Gaydos (Issues 11 to 14)
- Penciller(s): Mark Bagley (Issues 1 to 5); Brent Anderson (Issues 6 to 7); Michael Lark (Issues 8 to 10)
- Inker(s): Scott Hanna (Issues 1 to 5); Michael Lark (Issues 8 to 10); Stefano Gaudino (Issues 9 to 10); Michael Gaydos (Issues 11 to 14)
- Letterer: Vc Cory Petit
- Colorist(s): Matt Hollingsworth; Pete Pantazis; Frank D'ARMATA; Brian Reber

Collected editions
- Thin Air: ISBN 0-7851-1332-0
- Secret War: ISBN 0785114785
- Fear: ISBN 0785119515

The Pulse is a comic book series published by Marvel Comics, written by Brian Michael Bendis, about the people who work on "The Pulse," a weekly section in the fictional Daily Bugle newspaper, focusing on superheroes.

The main star of the book is Jessica Jones, a former superhero and private investigator, previously seen in the Alias series. Jones works as a specialist consultant for "The Pulse" with journalists Ben Urich and Kat Farrell. Other cast members include Luke Cage, superhero and boyfriend to Jessica, the Bugle's publisher, J. Jonah Jameson, and senior editor Joseph "Robbie" Robertson.

== Story arcs ==
Thin Air (Issues #1-5)

In the first story arc, the Green Goblin's true identity is revealed to the public after an investigation by The Daily Bugle into the murder of a Bugle journalist. After an extended battle with Spider-Man and Luke Cage, the Goblin is arrested and sent to prison for the first time in the character's 40-year history. Also, Ben Urich reveals to Peter Parker that he is aware that Peter is Spider-Man.

Secret War (Issues #6-9)

In the second story arc, in a tie-in to the Secret War mini-series, Jessica and Luke are attacked by Lucia von Bardas who leaves Luke in a coma. The hospital where Luke is being cared for is attacked and Luke disappears. Jessica fails to get help from the Bugle in locating him and must find him herself.

House of M (Stand-alone issue #10)

In a House of M tie-in, Kat Farrell meets Hawkeye, who is alive in this reality and despondent over recovering the memory of his life in the regular 616 universe (most specifically his death at the hands of the Scarlet Witch).

The Pulse Special Edition #1

A 50-cent promo printed on cheap newsprint. Made to look like a copy of the Daily Bugle's Pulse publication, covering the events of the House of M universe. Articles are "Headline News," "Global News," "Politics," "History Today," "Science," "Sports," "Arts and Leisure" and "Personal Growth."

Fear (Issues #11-13)

Ben Urich starts to investigate a down and out "C-list" hero named D-Man. With Luke Cage now an Avenger, Jessica Jones's water breaks while she, Luke Cage and best friend Carol Danvers are picking out a new costume design for him. Carol Danvers rushes Jessica to the hospital. Jessica gives birth to a baby girl, and refuses to give The Daily Bugle the agreed upon exclusive story. At the same time J. Jonah Jameson's slanderous coverage of the Avengers' unveiling (in New Avengers #15) brings Jessica to quit her job at the Bugle.

Finale (Stand-alone Issue #14)

Jessica Jones tells her baby girl, Danielle, about the first time she met Luke Cage. Jessica decides to consent to be his wife, though she has not informed Luke (she would marry him in New Avengers Annual #1).

== Collected editions ==
The series has been collected into trade paperbacks:

- Volume 1: Thin Air (collects 1–5, 2004, ISBN 0-7851-1332-0)
- Volume 2: Secret War (collects 6–9, 2005, ISBN 0-7851-1478-5)
- Volume 3: Fear (collects 11-14 and New Avengers Annual #1, 2006, ISBN 0-7851-1951-5)

Also published in Complete Collection

- Jessica Jones - The Pulse: The Complete Collection (collects 1–9, 11-14 and New Avengers Annual #1, 2014, ISBN 0-7851-9086-4)

== See also ==
- Deadline
