= Purple Man =

Supervillain appearing in Marvel Comics

- Cover of New Thunderbolts #10 (September 2005). Art by Tom Grummett.

Publication information
- Publisher: Marvel Comics
- First appearance: Daredevil #4 (November 1964)
- Created by: Stan Lee (writer); Joe Orlando (artist)

In-story information
- Alter ego: Zebediah Killgrave
- Species: Human mutate (Note: In Marvel Comics, the term "mutate" is used as a noun to designate characters that received superpowers from an external source, as opposed to Marvel's mutants.)
- Place of origin: Rijeka, Croatia
- Team affiliations: Purple Children; Villains for Hire; Hood's Gang
- Abilities: Mind control, manipulation, and brainwashing; Regeneration

The Purple Man is a supervillain appearing in American comic books published by Marvel Comics. Created by writer Stan Lee and artist Joe Orlando, the character first appeared in Daredevil #4 (1964) as an adversary of the superhero Daredevil, though he later became and endured as the archenemy of Jessica Jones. The Purple Man is the alias of Zebediah Killgrave, a Croatian spy who is exposed to chemicals that turn his skin purple and give him the ability to produce pheromones that allow him to control people's minds and actions through verbal suggestion.

A version of the character named Kilgrave was portrayed by David Tennant in the Marvel Cinematic Universe television series Jessica Jones.

== Publication history ==
Purple Man first appeared in Daredevil #4 (November 1964) and was created by writer Stan Lee and artist Joe Orlando.

== Fictional character biography ==
Zebediah Killgrave is born in Rijeka, Croatia. A physician turned international spy, he is sent to infiltrate a chemical refinery and is accidentally doused with a chemical that turns his hair and skin purple. Despite being caught and questioned, he is released after offering a weak alibi. Several more incidents like this demonstrate that the nerve gas gave Killgrave the ability to command the wills of other people. Calling himself the Purple Man, Killgrave embarks on a criminal career, where he is largely a Daredevil villain, fighting him early in his career and being imprisoned in a cell designed to damp his power, until he escapes and moves to San Francisco, building a small criminal enterprise over two years, only for Daredevil to topple it when he and Black Widow move to the city.

Early in his criminal career, he uses his mind-control powers to force a woman to become his wife. Before recovering and leaving him, she becomes pregnant with his daughter, Kara Killgrave. Kara inherits his discoloration and powers and becomes the Alpha Flight-affiliated superhero called the Purple Girl, and later Persuasion in Alpha Flight issue #41.

The character largely disappears from comic books during the 1980s although he does face Spider-Man, Moon Knight, Daredevil, Power Man, and Iron Fist in Marvel Team-Up Annual #4. He also appears in the graphic novel Emperor Doom in which Doctor Doom uses him to power the "psycho-prism", a machine that allows Doom to control the minds of everyone on Earth. During the process, Purple Man finds out that he cannot control Doom's mind even at close range, as Doom's mental fortitude is too great.

He reappears in the pages of X-Men, as the mastermind behind Nate Grey's rise to celebrity status as a miracle worker in New York. He has been subtly manipulating both the population of Manhattan and Nate himself into accepting and embracing himself as a modern messianic figure, who would then become so psychologically empowered by hero worship that he could change reality, using the full potential of his mutant power. The plan fails when Nate learns the truth and loses his confidence, thus reducing his power. Killgrave goes once more into hiding.

During Jessica Jones's time as the superhero Jewel, Killgrave uses his mind-control powers to subdue her, forcing her to live with him while psychologically torturing her for several months. He ultimately sends her off to kill Daredevil. The incident with Purple Man leaves her so traumatized that she leaves her life as a superhero behind and becomes a private investigator. Later, the Purple Man escapes again and tries controlling Jessica to kill the Avengers, but she manages to resist and knocks him out. Daredevil later has the Purple Man imprisoned in the Raft, a jail designed for super-powered criminals.

He escapes briefly when Electro creates a riot at the Raft during the first issues of New Avengers. Purple Man uses the opportunity to try to mind-control Luke Cage into killing the then soon-to-be-Avengers and threatens Jones, who is pregnant with Cage's child. Unknown to the Purple Man, drugs had been added to his food to negate his power during his imprisonment, so he is unable to control Cage, who beats him to a pulp in response to his demands.

Later, the Purple Man returns shortly before (and during) the House of M storyline and manipulates the Thunderbolts, while being manipulated himself by Baron Zemo, who uses the moonstones he recently acquired to free Killgrave from prison, leaving an illusion in his place so that the authorities would not be aware of his escape. With his pheromones distributed through New York's water system and Zemo's moonstones used to project his voice wherever necessary, the Purple Man enslaves the entire city. Under Zemo's direction, he uses the city's superhumans as his personal army to attack the Thunderbolts, whom he worked to turn against each other. Eventually, he is defeated by the Thunderbolts member Genis-Vell, after which Zemo teleports the Purple Man back and tortures him for his failure before sending him back to prison once more.

During the Scared Straight crossover between Thunderbolts and Avengers Academy, Purple Man is revealed to be incarcerated in the Raft Maximum Security Penitentiary, as Tigra warns her Academy students not to look at his face or read his lips. During a subsequent power outage caused by Academy member Hazmat, Killgrave, at the head of a small gang of mind-controlled inmates, again crosses paths with Luke Cage, now supervisor of a Thunderbolts team composed of Raft prisoners. Cage makes short work of Killgrave and his "recruits", revealing that the nanites that maintain control over his Thunderbolts also shield him from Purple Man's influence.

During the Fear Itself storyline, Purple Man and a majority of inmates are freed after the Raft is severely damaged by the transformation of the Juggernaut into Kuurth: Breaker of Stone and the subsequent damage caused by Kuurth's escape. Before escaping the Raft, Purple Man attempts to kill a comatose Puppet Master in the prison infirmary, and makes statements indicating that he was behind the Puppet Master's manipulation of Misty Knight's Heroes for Hire organization, using them to establish a criminal organization by proxy while incarcerated. He is prevented from killing the Puppet Master by Heroes for Hire operatives Elektra and the Shroud, who Killgrave attacks with a mob of mind-controlled inmates driven into a frenzy. When the heroes hold their own against the assault, Purple Man changes tactics and turns them against each other. He subsequently escapes the Raft via the Hudson River.

During Daredevil's time in San Francisco after the exposure of his secret identity, he encounters Purple Man's children, who inherited their father's powers. After Matt saves the children from their father, they use a machine their father created to enhance his powers to boost their own and erase the world's knowledge of Matt's identity as Daredevil. Purple Man's son Benjamin controls Carol Danvers and makes her believe that she threw Purple Man into the Sun.

== Powers and abilities ==
The Purple Man's body produces chemical pheromones which, when inhaled or absorbed through the skin, allow Killgrave to control others' actions as long as he is physically present. These abilities can overwhelm most, but sufficiently strong-willed people, such as Doctor Doom and Kingpin, have been able to resist its influence, and Daredevil has been able to resist Killgrave as the powers rely on full sensory manipulation, Daredevil's blindness hindering the amount of input he receives and making it easier for him to resist what he picks up. Moon Knight defeated the Purple Man by wearing earplugs that prevented him from hearing the villain's commands; he, Daredevil, and other heroes gagged the Purple Man before giving him to the police to prevent him from commanding others.

== Other versions ==
- An alternate timeline version of Killgrave appears in Marvel 1602 #3. This version became president for life of the United States and accidentally sent Captain America back in time while trying to kill him.
- An alternate universe version of Zebediah "Zeb" Killgrave from Earth-58163 appears in House of M. This version lacks powers and is a member of a human resistance movement who works undercover as a lobbyist for a mutant government.

== In other media ==
=== Television ===
David Tennant as Kilgrave in the television series Jessica Jones.

- Zebediah Killgrave appears in the X-Men: The Animated Series episode "No Mutant Is an Island", voiced by Colin Fox. This version is a mutant telepath.
- The Purple Man appears in The Avengers: Earth's Mightiest Heroes, voiced by Brent Spiner. This version was previously imprisoned in the Raft.
- A character based on the Purple Man named Kevin Thompson / Kilgrave appears in Jessica Jones, portrayed by David Tennant as an adult and James Freedson-Jackson as a child. This version gained his powers after being experimented on by his scientist parents as a child, who sought to cure a neurodegenerative disease. Additionally he enslaved Jessica Jones for months and became obsessed with her when she broke free of his control. In the first season, Kilgrave attempts to prove his love to Jessica by creating chaos for her to solve, but she eventually overcomes his abilities and kills him.

=== Video games ===
- The Purple Man appears in Marvel Avengers Alliance.
- The Purple Man appears in Marvel Avengers Academy.
