= Kheyrgu Rural District (Lamerd County) =

Rural district in Fars province, Iran

Kheyrgu Rural District Persian: دهستان خیرگو
- Rural District
- Location within Iran
- Coordinates: 27°32′59″N 53°16′25″E
- Country: Iran
- Province: Fars
- County: Lamerd
- District: Kheyrgu
- Capital: Chahar Taq

Population (2016)
  - Total: 8,611
- Time zone: UTC+3:30 (IRST)

Kheyrgu Rural District (Persian: دهستان خیرگو) is in Kheyrgu District of Lamerd County, Fars province, Iran. Its capital is the village of Chahar Taq. The previous capital of the rural district was the village of Kheyrgu (now a city).

== Demographics ==
=== Population ===
At the time of the 2006 National Census, the rural district's population (as a part of Alamarvdasht District) was 6,259 in 1,314 households. There were 6,757 inhabitants in 1,752 households at the following census of 2011. The 2016 census measured the population of the rural district as 8,611 in 2,529 households. The most populous of its 25 villages was Kheyrgu (now a city), with 1,821 people.

After the census, the rural district was separated from the district in the establishment of Kheyrgu District.
