= Amazing-Man (Centaur Publications) =

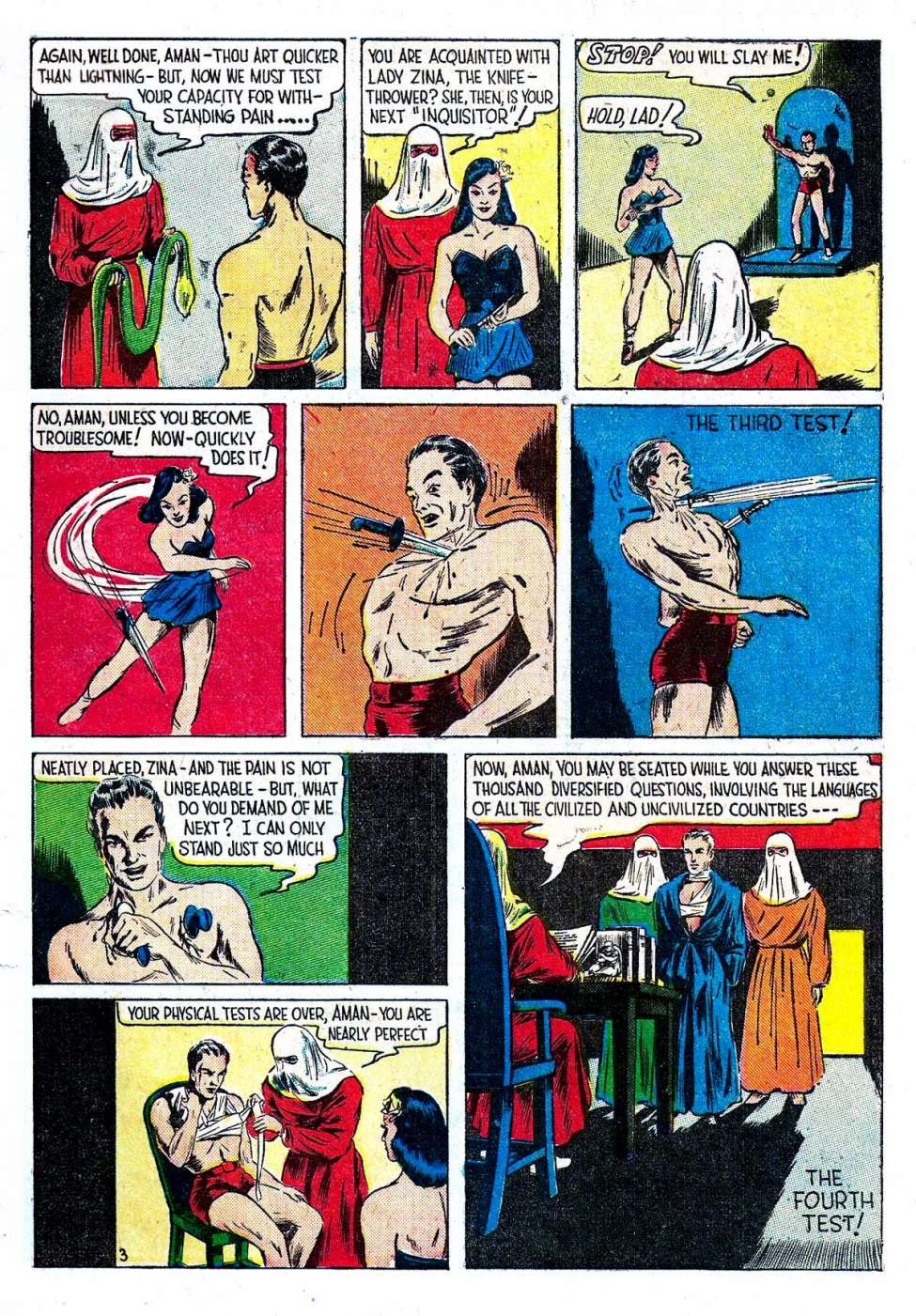
- Amazing-Man Comics #5 (Sept. 1939), first appearance of the Amazing-Man, art by Bill Everett.

Publication information
- Publisher: Centaur Publications; Malibu Comics; Marvel Comics
- First appearance: Centaur: Amazing-Man Comics #5 (Sept. 1939); Malibu: Protectors #2 (October 1992); Marvel: The Immortal Iron Fist #8 (August 2007)
- Created by: Centaur: Bill Everett; Malibu: R. A. Jones; Thomas Derenick; Marvel: Ed Brubaker; Matt Fraction; David Aja

In-story information
- Alter ego: John Aman
- Team affiliations: Malibu: Protectors; Marvel: Immortal Weapons; Secret Avengers
- Notable aliases: Prince of Orphans (Marvel), The Green Mist of Death
- Abilities: Slightly superhuman strength, speed, and endurance Ability to turn into a green mist

Amazing-Man (John Aman) is a comic book superhero whose adventures were published by Centaur Publications during the 1930s to 1940s in the Golden Age of Comic Books. Historians credit his creation variously to writer-artist Bill Everett or to Everett together with Centaur art director Lloyd Jacquet. Amazing-Man first appeared in Amazing-Man Comics #5 (Sept. 1939)—there were no issues numbered #1–4.

During the Golden Age of Comic Books, Centaur Publications produced Amazing-Man's eponymous series, Amazing-Man Comics, which ran from issues #5–26 (Sept. 1939 – Feb. 1942). Amazing-Man was the second superhero to have a comic book named after him, after Superman. In 1941, Centaur also included Amazing-Man in their war comic, Stars and Stripes Comics #2–6 (June–Dec. 1941). The book was cancelled in 1942 when the company went out of business.

The character influenced the creation and origin of Charlton Comics' 1960s superhero Peter Cannon, Thunderbolt, as well as Marvel Comics' Iron Fist character in the 1970s, and DC Comics' hero of the same name.

== Development ==
In a letter from Everett's wife, Grace, she revealed that the character was created in response to the National Periodical character Superman. "I'm going to spend all day tomorrow at the Public Library, doing some research work for Bill. He has a new character, for a strip which [Lloyd] Jaquet wants him to do in competition with the new one now being syndicated – called the “Superman' I think. We've wracked our brains for a new kind of character; and all I can think of now is to back over some old folk tales, foreign ones if necessary, and try to find some unusual character around which we can build an unusual story for these modern times."

== Fictional character biography ==
=== Centaur Comics ===
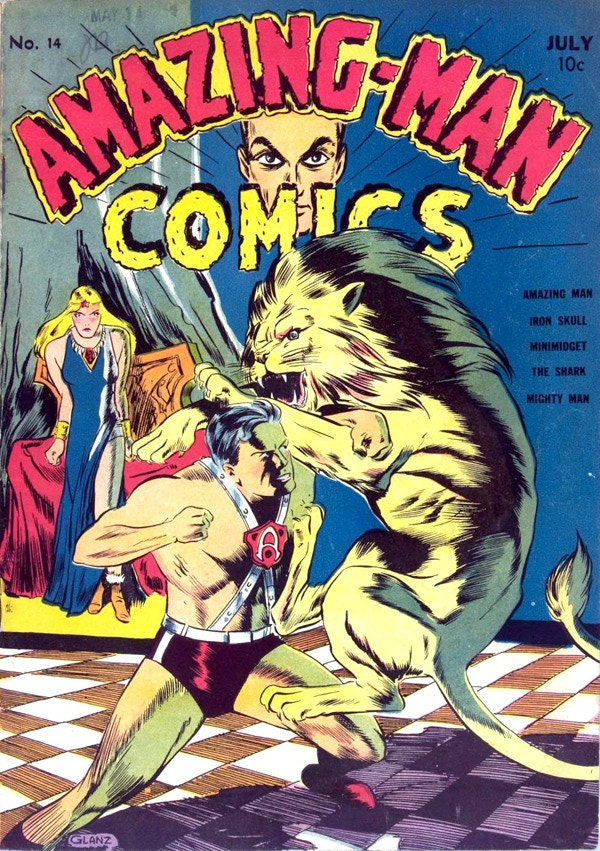
Cover of Amazing-Man Comics #14 (July 1940), art by Lew Glanzman.

John Aman is an orphan from the West, chosen for his "superb physical structure" to be raised by benevolent monks in Tibet for the first 25 years of his life. Each member of The Council of Seven, as the monks are known, trained him to a superhuman degree of physical and mental ability, while also giving him the ability via a chemical solution to disappear into a cloud of green mist, earning him the secondary title of the Green Mist. His new powers include super-strength, invulnerability and speed, as well as healing and telekinesis.

After receiving his final tests, he is sent into the world to use his skills and abilities to do good. Opposing Aman, as he was often known, is his nemesis the Great Question, a disgruntled member of the Council of Seven. Aman's sidekick is Tommy, the Amazing Kid, and he's also aided by "ace girl crime investigator" Zona Henderson.

=== Malibu Comics ===
Malibu Comics' Protectors #3 (November 1992), featuring Amazing Man. Cover art by Thomas Derenick & Mike S. Miller.

In the 1990s, Malibu Comics used the Centaur properties, including Amazing-Man, as the roster of its own superhero team, the Protectors. Aside from the costume, the Malibu version was essentially identical to the original.

=== Marvel Comics ===
Amazing-Man was introduced into the Marvel Universe, with the character Prince of Orphans revealing his identity as John Aman at the end of Immortal Iron Fist #12 (Feb. 2008). Earlier in the issue, Prince of Orphans is seen turning into green mist while battling Davos.

Aman had been sent by the Seven Heavenly Cities to assassinate Orson Randall (the Iron Fist before the present-day Danny Rand took on that mantle) in order to kill another "immortal weapon" like himself. Chasing Randall around the world, Aman would come close to killing his foe, only to yield honorably when Randall's allies would be injured. Eventually, Randall hinted that the masters of the Seven Heavenly Cities had lied to Aman concerning the Tournament of the Seven Heavenly Cities, in which every decade the victorious city is allowed to merge with the Earthly plane. Feeling betrayed after discovering the cities' masters had developed gateways to Earth without the knowledge of the cities' populace, Aman dropped his quest against Randall and vowed to make the city masters pay. Randall told Aman to assist the next Iron Fist in a revolution against the Seven Heavenly Cities.

The character later appeared in Secret Avengers #6–12 as the Prince of Orphans, to assist the Secret Avengers against the Shadow Council; Aman stopped the Shadow Council from resurrecting Zheng Zu, Shang-Chi's father. During this, it is revealed he met Captain America (Steve Rogers) during World War II.

During the 2011 "Fear Itself" storyline, Prince of Orphans appears in Washington D.C. during Blitzkrieg U.S.A, helping with the rescue efforts, alongside War Machine, Beast and Ant-Man. He tells War Machine that the "Eighth City" has been opened and leads the other Immortal Weapons in invoking a ceremony to close the Eighth City's gates.

In 2012, the character appeared as an antagonist in Matt Fraction's Defenders, which takes place in an alternate timeline.

When the dragons of the Seven Heavenly Cities are being killed by the Hierophant for their hearts, the Prince recruits Okoye to help the Immortal Weapons in saving the dragons. In The Undead Iron Fist, the Prince and other Immortal Weapons are possessed by Quan Yaozu into attacking Danny Rand, who had returned from death as Ghost Fist, but Ghost Fist is able to defeat and free Aman and the others from Quan's control.

In Deadly Hands of K'un-Lun, the Prince of Orphans is killed along with the other Immortal Weapons while defending the Seven Heavenly Cities from the forces of Lin Feng.

== Other versions ==
Under his original name, Amazing-Man is one of many public domain superheroes to appear in issue #0 of Project Superpowers, a miniseries from Dynamite Entertainment; a sketch of him is included in issue #2.

In 2014, Barry Gregory and Steven Butler released a new series by Gallant Comics. The new series, titled John Aman Amazing Man, Gregory and Butler used other public domain characters, like Blue Beetle and Miss Masque. In 2015, they launched a crowdfunding campaign in Kickstarter to finish a six-part arc.

In the Ultimate Universe, the Prince of Meltdowns is a servant of the Hulk—the Iron Fist of this continuity— along with the other Immortal Weapons and is empowered by gamma radiation.

== In other media ==
The Prince of Orphans appears in the backstory for Iron Fist in the video game Marvel Rivals. When most of the Immortal Weapons go missing after the Timestream Entanglement, the Prince becomes the guardian of Laussa—the infant sister of Angela—and trains Iron Fist while hiding in the Eighth City. The Prince remains in hiding when the Tournament of Heaven invoked, prompting Z'Gambo's Immortal Beast Xiezhi to look for a replacement.
