= Immortal Weapons =

American comic book characters

- Cover art for The Immortal Iron Fist #22. Art by Patrick Zircher. Clockwise from center: Iron Fist, Dog Brother #1, Bride of Nine Spiders, Tiger's Beautiful Daughter, Fat Cobra, Prince of Orphans.

Publication information
- Publisher: Marvel Comics
- First appearance: The Immortal Iron Fist #8 (September 2007)
- Created by: Ed Brubaker; Matt Fraction; David Aja

In-story information
- Member(s): Various

The Immortal Weapons are fictional characters appearing in American comic books published by Marvel Comics. They are each a champion of one of the Seven Heavenly Cities in the Marvel Universe. The Immortal Weapons first appear in The Immortal Iron Fist #8 (September 2007) and as a group, were created by Ed Brubaker, Matt Fraction and David Aja.

== Publication history ==
The characters were first introduced in The Immortal Iron Fist #8—and remained supporting characters in the series until its cancellation (#27). The group then starred in their own series, which began in July 2009—with the first issue focusing on Fat Cobra; written by Jason Aaron and Duane Swierczynski with art by Mico Suayan and Travel Foreman.

== History ==
The Immortal Weapons are the champions of the Seven Heavenly Cities, each skilled in martial arts and are blessed with mythical chi that they can utilize in battle. Every 88 years, the Seven Heavenly Cities are merged into the Heart of Heaven, where the Immortal Weapons participate in the Tournament of Heaven to decide the order in which the cities will appear on Earth. In 1933, the Iron Fist Orson Randall refused to participate and the other Immortal Weapons were dispatched to strip him of his title. However, Randall killed the Crane Champion in self defense and fled into exile.

In the present day, the Tournament is held again and the Immortal Weapons are summoned to compete, with Randall's successor Danny Rand and Rand's rival Davos entering as participants. As the Crane Mother can only give birth to a new Crane Champion every 300 years, she chooses Davos to represent K'un-Zi and changes his moniker of Steel Serpent to Steel Phoenix. As the Tournament commences, the Immortal Weapons discover the corruption behind the leadership of the Seven Heavenly Cities. They join forces with Lei Kung's Army of Thunder to overthrow Yu-Ti and stop the Crane Mother and Hydra from destroying the Heart of Heaven. The Immortal Weapons and the Army are victorious, although Davos is cut off from his Crane powers by the Crane Mother for betraying her. The remaining Immortal Weapons accompany Rand back to New York City.

The Immortal Weapons rally together to save the dragons of Seven Heavenly Cities from the Hierophant. Their success comes at a cost, as Tiger's Beautiful Daughter is killed while Rand is forced to transfer the Iron Fist to Okoye to defeat the Hierophant and revive the dragons. Okoye turns down Rand's offer to be the new Iron Fist and transfers her power to Shou-Lao's reborn egg.

In Deadly Hands of K'un-Lun, Lin Feng invades the Seven Heavenly Cities as part of his plans to revive Chiyou. The Immortal Weapons are killed defending their cities, while Steel Serpent and Tiger's Faithful Daughter join Feng's forces.

== Members ==
=== Tournament of Heaven lineup ===
Historically, the Immortal Weapons have had seven members to each represent the Seven Heavenly Cities for the Tournament of Heaven. Previously known Immortal Weapons for this event have included the Iron Fists Quan Yaozu and Orson Randall and an unnamed Crane Champion who was killed by Orson in 1932.

- Iron Fist - Danny Rand, the 67th wielder of the Iron Fist and champion of K'un-Lun. He would later be succeeded by Lin Lie.
- Fat Cobra - A large man who can project lightning and move at superhuman speeds, despite his bulky size. The champion of Peng Lai.
- Bride of Nine Spiders - A woman who controls spiders and can store them in her body. The champion of the Kingdom of Spiders.
- Dog Brother #1 - Shihing, the leader of the Under City who can communicate with and control dogs.
- Tiger's Beautiful Daughter - Li Hua, the champion of Tiger Island, a nation renowned for its women warriors. After her death, she was succeeded by Tiger's Faithful Daughter.
- Prince of Orphans - John Aman, the champion of Z'Gambo who can turn his body into green mist.
- Steel Phoenix - When K'un-Zi lacked a representative for the Tournament of Heaven, the Crane Mother chose Davos—the Steel Serpent—and imbued him with the powers of the Crane Champion. Following the Tournament, Davos was stripped of his title and powers.

== Other versions ==
An alternate universe iteration of the Immortal Weapons appears in the Ultimate Universe imprint. This version of the group are servants of the Hulk and the Children of the Eternal Light. In addition to chi, they all derive their power from gamma radiation.

=== Immortal Weapons of the Hulk ===
- Hulk - The current Iron Fist and leader of the Immortal Weapons.
- Uranium Brother #235
- Decay's Beautiful Daughter
- Prince of Meltdowns
- Bride of Nine World-Breakers
- Crane Mother of the Bomb
- Fat Cobra

== In other media ==
=== Television ===
- Bride of Nine Spiders appears in Iron Fist, portrayed by Jane Kim. This version is a Korean arachnologist whose real name is Alessa.
- Fat Cobra appears in Hit-Monkey, voiced by Noshir Dalal.

=== Video games ===
The Immortal Weapons appear in Marvel Rivals, consisting of Iron Fist, Crane Deceiver, Odin's Beautiful Daughter, Ironwood Serpent, Black Widow, Queen of Orphans, Dog Brother X, and Dizang.
