= The Immortal Iron Fist =

Comic book series from Marvel Comics

- Iron Fist on the variant cover of The Immortal Iron Fist #1 (November 2006); art by David Aja.

Publication information
- Publisher: Marvel Comics
- Format: Ongoing series
- Genre: Martial arts, superhero
- Publication date: November 2006 – August 2009
- No. of issues: 27
- Main character: Iron Fist

Creative team as of September 2008
- Created by: Ed Brubaker; Matt Fraction; David Aja; Travel Foreman
- Written by: Duane Swierczynski
- Artist: Travel Foreman

Collected editions
- Volume 1: The Last Iron Fist Story: ISBN 0-7851-2489-6

The Immortal Iron Fist was a comic book series published by Marvel Comics and starring the superhero Iron Fist.

== Publication history ==
The series was written jointly by Ed Brubaker and Matt Fraction from issues #1-14 with artists Travel Foreman and David Aja. Fraction wrote issues #15 and 16 alone. From issue #17 to the series' cancellation at issue #27, the series was written by Duane Swierczynski and largely drawn by a returning Travel Foreman.

== Plot summary ==
=== "The Last Iron Fist Story" (#1–6) ===
The series' first story arc introduces Orson Randall, Daniel Rand's immediate predecessor as Iron Fist, who reneged on his responsibilities to K'un-Lun after suffering immense psychological trauma during the First World War. Randall, living in drug-soaked seclusion, is pursued by agents of the Steel Serpent and the terrorist group Hydra. Jolted out of his decades-long ennui, Randall seeks out Daniel Rand in New York and gives him The Book of the Iron Fist, a sacred ledger supposedly containing all the Kung-fu secrets of previous Iron Fists, which Randall claims will be necessary if Rand is to compete successfully in the coming Tournament of the Seven Capital Cities of Heaven.

The Steel Serpent, whose powers have been greatly augmented by Crane Mother, a ruler of another timeless city, quickly dispatches Randall in single combat. On the brink of death, Randall surrenders his Chi to Danny, giving him sufficient power to battle the Serpent to a standstill. After the battle, Rand is immediately summoned by his master, Yu-Ti.

=== "The Pirate Queen of Pinghai Bay" (#7) ===
This issue focus on the life of Wu Ao-Shi, the first female Iron Fist who lived circa 1545 A.D.

=== "The Seven Capital Cities of Heaven" (#8–14) ===
Summoned by Yu-Ti, Iron Fist has to compete in a tournament against champions from other cities, that will decide the order in which each of the Seven Cities of Heaven will appear on Earth. During the tournament, it is discovered that the leaders of the Seven Cities had secretly erected gateways between Earth and each city without the knowledge of the populace. The corruption of the leaders of the Seven Cities of Heaven has spurred Iron Fist, his master Lei Kung the Thunderer, Orson Randall's daughter, and the Prince of Orphans to secretly plan a revolution. Meanwhile, Crane Mother and Xao, a high-ranking Hydra operative, are planning to destroy K'un-Lun by using a portal to deliver a train full of explosives to the city.

With the help of the other Immortal Weapons, Danny destroys the train by extending his chi to find the train's electro-magnetic field, transforming himself into "a human bullet." Meanwhile, the revolution orchestrated by Lei Kung and Orson's daughter proves successful, with Nu-an, the Yu-Ti of K'un-Lun fleeing in terror. As Danny confronts Xao, he reveals that there is an eighth city of Heaven, before killing himself. In the aftermath, Steel Serpent surrenders, seeking to redeem himself to the people of K'un-Lun. Danny suggests Lei Kung as the new Yu-Ti, with Randall's nameless daughter as the new Thunderer.

=== "The Story of the Iron Fist Bei Bang-Wen" (#15) ===
This issue focus on the life of Bei Bang-Wen, an Iron Fist who fought the English during the Second Opium War, circa 1860 A.D.

=== "Happy Birthday Danny" (#16) ===
With Danny's 33rd birthday approaching, the investigation on the existence of the Eight City continues. Danny decides to transform Rand Inc. into a non-profit organization, dedicated to helping the poor. He also sets up the Thunder Dojo in Harlem to help inner city children, buys back the old Heroes for Hire building as the new Rand International Headquarters, and his new home, while offering Luke Cage a position at the company. He also discovers that almost every previous Iron Fist died at the age of 33.

=== "The Mortal Iron Fist" (#17–20) ===
Soon afterward Danny is attacked by a servant of Ch'I-Lin, Zhou Cheng, who claims that he has killed many Iron Fists. Iron Fist is rescued by Luke, Misty and Colleen as Zhou Cheng prepares to slay Danny. The Ch'l-Lin Assassin targets the Thunder Dojo next, but Danny manages to defeat him with the help of the Immortal Weapons.

The Immortal weapons embark on a hunt for Cheng, while Danny attempts to learn about his new adversary. He soon learns that Orson Randall was only able to escape Cheng by addicting himself to heroin, thus damping his chi and leaving Cheng unable to track him. While searching for a way to defeat Cheng in the Book of the Iron Fist, Danny discovers that his assistant, Nadine, is an accomplice to Cheng, after she poisons his coffee. Cheng is seeking the retrieve the heart of the Iron Fist in order to enter K'un-Lun and devour the egg that resurrects Shou-Lao every generation, thus wiping out K'un-Lun's Iron Fist legacy.

Iron Fist manages to defeat Cheng even in his weakened state. Following the duel, the Immortal Weapons, Luke, Colleen, and Misty arrive, and reveal to Danny that they have discovered a map in Cheng's apartment that leads to the Eighth City of Heaven, Danny and the Immortal Weapons realize that his is where the Ch'l-Lin originated, and depart for the Eighth City.

=== "Wah Sing-Rand and the Mandate of Heaven" (#21) ===
In the year 3099 Wah Sing-Rand, the youngest Iron Fist ever, fights to free the people of the planet Yaochi from the tyrannical rule of president Xing.

=== "Escape from the Eighth City" (#22–23, 25–26) ===
Davos arrives at the behest of Lei Kung to inform Danny that the Eighth city is, in fact, a prison constructed to hold demonic creatures that had once threatened K'un-Lun and the other cities of Heaven. Davos also informs Danny that the previous Yu-Ti had housed anyone who attempted to rebel against his rule in the Eighth city, and Lei Kung commissions Danny and the Immortal Weapons to rescue the wrongful prisoners.

Upon arrival at the gates of the city, Danny and the others are literally sucked into the depths of the city, whereupon they are attacked by the prisoners of the Eighth City, which is ruled by the nefarious Changming, and forced to fight the demons of the city one by one, each time beaten nearly to death. One of Danny's fellow prisoner reveals himself as Quan Yaozu, the first Iron Fist. Quan reveals that in the early days of K'un-Lun's history, Changming had been the one who had originally summoned all of the demonic creatures that had once plagued the city, including Shou-Lao, and used them to quickly conquer the city. One day, however, a lone warrior had entered the dragon's cave to challenge it.

Before Quan can finish, he and Danny are removed from their cells and brought into the arena for a fight. By now, Changming has learned that Danny and the Immortal Weapons have been formulating a plan to rescue the prisoners of the Eighth City and make their escape, by leaving each other Morse code messages in the arena after each fight. Changming declares that Danny and Quan will fight to the death. However, once the fight begins, Danny immediately senses that his opponent lacks any perceivable martial arts skills and realizes that he is not the true Quan Yaozu. As the Immortal Weapons manage to escape and defeat the guards during the fight, Changming reveals that he is the true Quan Yaozu. He explains that he voluntarily stayed in the Eighth City to keep K'un-Lun's demons from escaping. However, upon seeing innocent people thrown into the Eighth City, Quan became disillusioned, and believed that K'un-Lun was not worth saving, eventually rising up to rule the Eighth City.

Quan forces Danny to lead him out of Eighth City and back to K'un-Lun, but after making it outside the gate, the two encounter Davos, who is waiting outside the gate with a sniper rifle. He tells Danny that he has been sent there by Lei-Kung to assassinate Quan, as he and Lei-Kung believe that Danny lacks the ability to take his life. In the ensuing battle, Danny manages to defeat both Davos and Quan, going as far as to take a bullet in the hand for the latter. Danny's actions impress Quan, who decides that Danny may be living proof that K'un-Lun is not the corrupt city it once was. Danny and Davos agree to guide Quan to K'un-Lun and arrange a meeting between him and Lei-Kung to give Quan a forum for his grievances.

=== "Li Park, The Reluctant Weapon Vs. Unstoppable Forces of Evil" (#24) ===
In 730 A.D., an unlikely candidate becomes the new Iron Fist, who seeks to resolve conflict by avoiding direct conflict.

=== "The Fall of the House of Rand" (#27) ===
When Danny returns to New York, he finds a Hydra cell waiting for him at Rand Inc., seeking retribution for the death of Xao, and holding Misty hostage. In the ensuing battle, the headquarters of Rand Inc. are damaged by a series of explosions, but Danny and Misty escape unharmed. Now left with only a fraction of his former net worth, Danny and Misty purchase a new condo in Harlem, and Danny decides to focus all of his attention and remaining resources at the Thunder Dojo. While moving into their new home, Danny asks Misty to marry him. Initially skeptical of the offer, thinking it may only be "one of those honor things", Misty accepts and reveals that she is pregnant with Danny's child.

== Annuals, Specials and Tie-ins ==
=== Civil War: Choosing Sides ===
This Civil War tie-in features a short story,"Choosing Sides", that acts as a prelude to the series. It was reprinted in The Immortal Iron Fist #1 Director's Cut.

=== Annual #1 - Men of A Certain Deadly Persuasion ===
Set between issues 9 and 10, Danny Rand learns the life story of his predecessor, Orson Randall, while fighting Hydra.

=== Orson Randall and The Green Mist of Death ===
Written by Matt Fraction with art by Mitch Breitweiser, Nick Dragotta, Russ Heath Jr. & Lewis LaRosa, this special shows the numerous confrontations between Orson Randall and Prince of Orphans across the decades.

=== The Origin Of Danny Rand ===
A reprint of Marvel Premiere #15-16 featuring new coloring and a framing sequence by Matt Fraction and Kano.

=== Orson Randall and The Death Queen of California ===
Orson Randall tracks down an old friend's lost daughter in Hollywood during 1928. Written by Duane Swierczynski with art by Giuseppe Camuncoli,

== Spin-offs ==
=== Immortal Weapons Miniseries ===
After the conclusion of the main title, Marvel Comics published a 5-issue miniseries focusing on the Immortal Weapons. Each issue, with a cover by David Aja, featured a lead story about one of these characters, with a back-up feature starring Iron Fist running across all five issues. Entitled "The Caretakers", it was written by Duane Swierczynski with art by Travel Foreman (Parts 1 & 2) and Hatuey Diaz (Parts 3 to 5).

Issue	Title	Spotlight	Creative Team
01	The Book of the Cobra	Fat Cobra	Written by Jason Aaron, Art by Roberto de la Torre, Khari Evans, Stefano Gaudiano, Michael Lark, Arturo Lozzi, Mico Suayan
02	The Spider's Song	Bride of Nine Spiders	Written by Cullen Bunn, Art by Daniel Brereton
03	Urban Legend	Dog Brother #1	Written by Rick Spears, Art by Timothy Green II
04	Tiger's Beautiful Daughter	Tiger's Beautiful Daughter	Written by Duane Swierczynski, Art by Khari Evans
05	The Loyal Ten Thousand Dead	Prince of Orphans	Written by David Lapham, Art by Arturo Lozzi

=== The Books Of the Iron Fist short story ===
In September 2010 an epilogue to the series was published in the first issue of the I Am An Avenger anthology miniseries. Written by Duane Swierczynski with art by Jason Latour, the eight-page short story entitled "The Books of the Iron Fist" deals with Misty Knight's pregnancy and her relationship with Danny Rand.

== Collected editions ==
The series has been collected into a series of hardcovers and trade paperbacks:

Title	Collected material
Volume 1: The Last Iron Fist Story	The Immortal Iron Fist #1–6, short story from Civil War: Choosing Sides
Volume 2: The Seven Capital Cities of Heaven	The Immortal Iron Fist #8–14, Annual #1
Volume 3: The Book of Iron Fist	The Immortal Iron Fist #7, #15–16,Orson Randall and the Green Mist of Death, The Origin of Danny Rand
Volume 4: The Mortal Iron Fist	The Immortal Iron Fist #17–20, Orson Randall and The Death Queen of California
Volume 5: Escape from the Eight City	The Immortal Iron Fist #21-27
Immortal Weapons	Immortal Weapons #1-5
The Immortal Iron Fist Omnibus Hardcover	The Immortal Iron Fist #1–16, Annual #1, Orson Randall and the Green Mist of Death, The Origin of Danny Rand, short story from Civil War: Choosing Sides
The Immortal Iron Fist: The Complete Collection Volume 1	The Immortal Iron Fist #1–16, Annual #1, Orson Randall and the Green Mist of Death, The Origin of Danny Rand, short story from Civil War: Choosing Sides
The Immortal Iron Fist: The Complete Collection Volume 2	The Immortal Iron Fist #17–27, Orson Randall and The Death Queen of California, Immortal Weapons #1-5

== Awards ==
The series was nominated for a 2008 Eisner Award for Best New Series.

Ed Brubaker won the 2008 Eisner Award for Best Writer in part for his work on The Immortal Iron Fist.
