= Crane Mother =

Publication information
- Publisher: Marvel Comics
- First appearance: Immortal Iron Fist #4 (May, 2007)
- Created by: Ed Brubaker; Matt Fraction

In-story information
- Alter ego: Unknown
- Abilities: Chi manipulation; Longevity; Resurrection

Crane Mother is a fictional character appearing in American comic books published by Marvel Comics. She is the ruler of the mythical city K'un-Zi and is an enemy of Iron Fist.

== Fictional character biography ==
Crane Mother was the ruler of K'un-Zi, one of the Legendary Cities of Heaven. In 1933, a meeting took place with all seven lords where she accused the current bearer of the Iron Fist (Orson Randall), of sullying tradition because he refused to participate in the Tournament of the Heavenly Cities. In each city, an Immortal Weapon, such as the Iron Fist, fights for their city in the tournament. The battles in the tournament decide the order of the cities within the heavenly timeline. All council members except Lord Tuan, the Yu-Ti of K'un-Lun, agreed that Randall should face punishment. The Immortal Weapons would confront Randall and he ended up killing the Crane Champion, the Immortal Weapon of K'un-Zi and a child of the Crane Mother. The Crane Mother would develop a vendetta against Rand that would last for decades. In the present day, she resurrects the Steel Serpent and imbues him with the chi of the Crane Champion. She tasks Davos with hunting down Randall in exchange for the life of his archenemy, the current Iron Fist Danny Rand. With the help of the Mother's Crane Daughters and his allies from Hydra allies, Davos succeeds in hunting down and killing Randall but fails to kill Rand when Randall uses his last breaths to transfer his remaining chi to his successor.

During the next Tournament of Heaven, Crane Mother choses Davos to represent K'un-Zi as its champion, who then changes his name Steel Serpent to Steel Phoenix to reflect his new allegiance to her. As the tournament commences, she conspires with Hydra to destroy K'un-Lun by detonating the Heart of Heaven with explosives but they are thwarted by the Immortal Weapons, Lei Kung and his Army of Thunder and even Davos himself. The Crane Mother escapes retribution when the Hydra forces are defeated but she cuts Davos off from her chi in retaliation for his betrayal.

After K'un-Lun is attacked by the One and Pei escapes with the reborn egg of Shou-Lao to new york, Crane Mother sends the Crane Daughters to retrieve the egg but they are stopped by Davos, who is after the egg himself.

== Powers and abilities ==
The Crane Mother possesses superhuman longevity, having been able to live for centuries. She can control mystical chi, which she can use in various ways. The Crane Mother gives birth to a Crane Champion every 300 years but she can bestow or take away the Crane Champion's power onto others.

== Other versions ==
In the Ultimate Universe, the Crane Mother of the Bomb is the Immortal Weapon of K'un-Zi and along with the other Immortal Weapons, is empowered by Gamma radiation and is a servant of the Hulk—the Iron Fist of this continuity.

== In other media ==
=== Television ===
- The Crane Mother is alluded to in the Marvel Cinematic Universe series Iron Fist as the namesake of a subversive organization in K'un-L'un called the Order of the Crane Mother.
  - The Crane Daughters are adapted in the second season as the Crane Sisters, who are unaffiliated with the Order of the Crane Mother and are a trio of mystics enlisted by Davos to help him steal the Iron Fist from Danny Rand. They consist of Aiko, Avalon and D. K. and are played by Jean Tree, Lori Laing and Lauren Mary Kim, respectively.

=== Video Games ===
The Crane Mother is mentioned in Marvel Rivals as the Immortal Weapon of K'un-Zi. She, along with most of the other Immortal Weapons, go missing after the Timestream Entanglement.
