= Iron Fist (character) =

Marvel Comics fictional character

- Textless cover of Iron Fist #1 (March 2017); Art by Alex Ross

Publication information
- Publisher: Marvel Comics
- First appearance: As Iron Fist: Marvel Premiere #15 (May 1974); As Thunderer: Iron Fist: The Living Weapon #12 (May 2015); As Ghost Fist: The Undead Iron Fist #1 (September 2025)
- Created by: Roy Thomas; Gil Kane

In-story information
- Alter ego: Daniel Thomas "Danny" Rand-K'ai
- Species: Human
- Team affiliations: Avengers; New Avengers; Heroes for Hire; Defenders; Immortal Weapons; Thunderbolts
- Partnerships: Colleen Wing; Misty Knight; Shang-Chi; Power Man (Luke Cage); Power Man (Victor Alvarez); Iron Fist (Pei); Iron Fist (Lin Lie)
- Notable aliases: The Living Weapon, Young Dragon, Daredevil, Thunderer, Undead Iron Fist, Ghost Fist, Fist of Vengeance
- Abilities: Master martial artist; Expert acrobat and gymnast; Mystical energy generation, manipulation and projection; Supernatural awareness; Intangibility; Sound generation; Formerly: Utilizing concentrated chi in his fist called the "Iron Fist", a mystical weapon

Iron Fist (Daniel Thomas "Danny" Rand-K'ai) is a superhero appearing in American comic books published by Marvel Comics. Created by Roy Thomas and Gil Kane and inspired by kung fu films, Iron Fist first appeared in Marvel Premiere #15 (May 1974). The character is a practitioner of martial arts and the wielder of a mystical force known as the Iron Fist, which allows him to summon and focus his chi. This ability is obtained from the city of K'un-L'un, which appears on Earth every 10 years. According to his co-creator Thomas, the creators of Iron Fist used some story elements from Bill Everett's 1939 hero Amazing-Man, which itself had borrowed heavily from James Hilton's novel Lost Horizon and its 1937 film adaptation.

Iron Fist starred in his own solo series in the 1970s, and shared the title Power Man and Iron Fist for several years with Luke Cage, partnering with Cage to form the superhero team Heroes for Hire. Rand frequently appeared with the Daughters of the Dragon duo Misty Knight and Colleen Wing – with Rand often seen in a relationship with the former, marking the first interracial romance in Marvel Comics history. Danny Rand has starred in numerous solo titles since, including The Immortal Iron Fist, which expanded on his origin story and the history of the Iron Fist. This series establishes that there is a long tradition of Iron Fist incarnations in the Marvel Universe, and that Danny Rand is only the most recent.

In later years, Iron Fist occasionally assumes the role of the Thunderer, becoming a mentor to several young heroes and martial artists, including the new Power Man Victor Alvarez and the young monk Pei. Rand eventually relinquishes his title and powers, which are later passed on to his successor Lin Lie. Rand meets his untimely death at the hands of the Ch'i-Lin, a longtime foe of the Iron Fists, but is resurrected and bestowed with new powers as the Ghost Fist in the series The Undead Iron Fist.

Iron Fist has been adapted to appear in several animated television series and video games. Finn Jones portrayed the character in the live-action Marvel Cinematic Universe (MCU) Netflix television series Iron Fist (2017–2018), The Defenders (2017), the second season of Luke Cage (2018), and will appear in the third season of the Disney+ Marvel Studios series Daredevil: Born Again (2027). Other incarnations of Iron Fist have appeared in the Marvel Studios Animation series What If...? and Eyes of Wakanda.

== Publication history ==
=== Creation ===
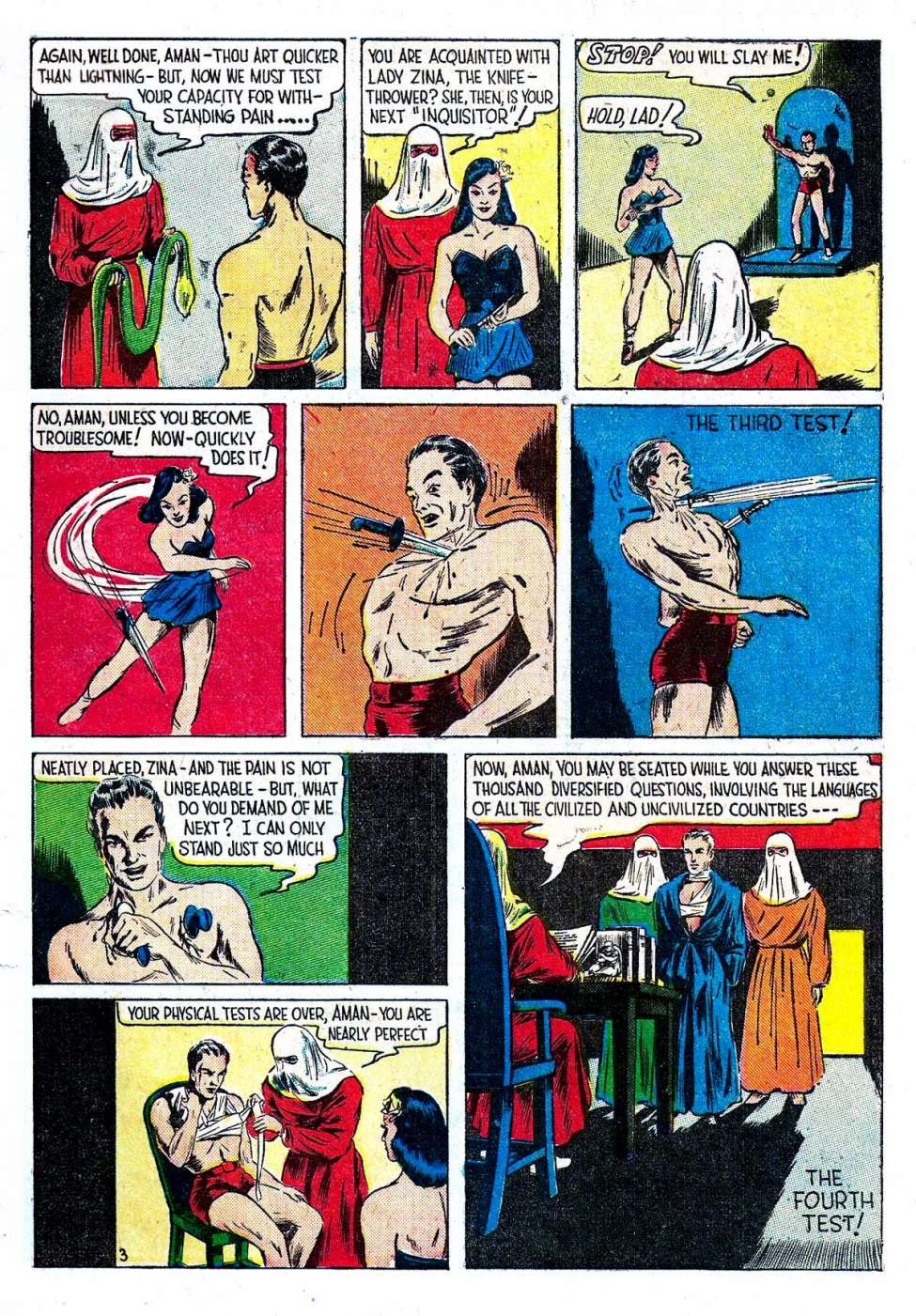
Amazing-Man in Amazing-Man Comics #5 (September 1939). Art by Bill Everett

Iron Fist, along with the previously created martial artist Shang-Chi, came from Marvel Comics during an American pop culture trend in the early to mid-1970s of martial arts heroes. Writer/co-creator Roy Thomas wanted to emulate Shang-Chi, who has achieved some commercial success, but to make a new martial-artist hero with a more conventional superhero appearance and costume. Thomas wrote in a text piece in Marvel Premiere #15 that Iron Fist's origin and creation owe much to the Bill Everett character, John Aman, the Amazing-Man, created in 1939. Thomas later wrote that he and artist/co-creator Gil Kane had

...started "Iron Fist" because I'd seen my first kung fu movie, even before a Bruce Lee one came out, and it had a thing called "the ceremony of the Iron Fist" in it. I thought that was a good name, and we already had Master of Kung Fu going, but I thought, "Maybe a superhero called Iron Fist, even though we had Iron Man, would be a good idea." [Publisher] Stan [Lee] liked the name, so I got hold of Gil and he brought in his Amazing Man influences, and we designed the character together...

The film mentioned by Thomas is King Boxer, aka Five Fingers of Death (1972), which presents the Iron Fist technique. Thomas further discussed the character's creation stating, "When Stan Lee gave me a verbal approval to star him in a series, I contacted Gil Kane and we worked out the costume and story. I had Gil give him a dragon brand on his chest, inspired by the one branded into Bullseye, a great western character created by Joe Simon and Jack Kirby. At Gil's urging, we took some story elements from Bill Everett's 1939 hero Amazing-Man, which itself had borrowed heavily from James Hilton's novel Lost Horizon and the first movie made from it, which introduced 'Shangri-La' to the world." Comics scholar Troy D. Smith argues that Iron First was initially a blend of Everett's Amazing-Man and Hilton's Lost Horizon, together with some aspects of Kwai Chang Caine, the hero of the television series Kung Fu.

=== 1970s ===
Iron Fist debuted in a story written by Thomas and pencilled by Kane in the umbrella title Marvel Premiere #15 (May 1974). He appeared in the subsequent issue, this time written by Len Wein and drawn by Larry Hama; beginning with issue #17 several issues were written by Doug Moench with continuing art by Hama. Moench said that he only wrote the series on Thomas's request, as he preferred his main writing assignment, Shang Chi, Master of Kung Fu. Tony Isabella and Chris Claremont wrote later stories featuring the character in Marvel Premiere, with art by successive pencillers Arvell Jones, Pat Broderick, and, in some of his earliest professional work, John Byrne. He continued to appear in Marvel Premiere through issue #25 (October 1975); these issues established a considerable readership for the character. Following this run, Iron Fist was spun off into the solo series Iron Fist, which ran 15 issues (November 1975 – September 1977). The solo series was written by Claremont and pencilled by Byrne; the two became well-known for their work together on Uncanny X-Men. Issue #14 (August 1977) introduced the character later known as Sabretooth, who later became the archenemy of Wolverine. Following the series cancellation, the storyline continued in issues #63–64 of Marvel Team-Up; in the concluding issue Rand kisses Misty Knight, marking the first interracial kiss and first long-term interracial couple in Marvel Comics history.

Iron Fist's appearances outside his own title include three Iron Fist stories in Marvel's black-and-white comics magazine The Deadly Hands of Kung Fu #10 (March 1975), an additional story co-starring the Sons of the Tiger in issue #18 (November 1975), and a six-part serial, "The Living Weapon", in #19–24 (December 1975 – May 1976).

To rescue the character from cancellation, Marvel paired Iron Fist with another character who was no longer popular enough to sustain his own series, Luke Cage. The two characters were partnered in a three-part story in Cage's series Power Man #48–50. The title of the series changed to Power Man and Iron Fist with issue #50 (April 1978), although the indicia did not reflect this change until issue #67. Jo Duffy, a fan of both characters, was appointed as its writer at her request beginning with issue #56. Troy D. Smith says that the partnership was partly inspired by the shared audience for kung fu and Blaxploitation films in the 1970s, and the interracial hero alliance of Bruce Lee, Jim Kelly, and John Saxon in Enter the Dragon (1973). Iron Fist co-starred in the series until the final issue (#125, September 1986), when the character was killed off. Writer Jim Owsley (subsequently known as Christopher Priest) later commented, "Fist's death was senseless and shocking and completely unforeseen. It took the readers' heads clean off. And, to this day, people are mad about it. Forgetting, it seems, that (a) you were supposed to be mad, that death is senseless and Fist's death was supposed to be senseless, or that (b) this is a comic book."

=== 1990s and 2000s ===
Iron Fist was revived half a decade later in Namor, the Sub-Mariner #21–25 (December 1991 – April 1992), a story which revealed that the character killed in Power Man and Iron Fist #125 was a doppelgänger. The story was both written and drawn by Byrne, who found the manner of Iron Fist's death objectionable and later commented, "In one of those amazing examples of Marvel serendipity, it turned out to be fairly easy not only to resurrect Danny, but to make it seem like that was the plan all along." Iron Fist then became a frequently starring character in the anthology series Marvel Comics Presents, featuring in three multi-part story arcs and four one-shot stories in 1992 and 1993. Two solo miniseries followed: Iron Fist (vol. 2) #1–2 (September–October 1996), by writer James Felder and penciller Robert Brown; and Iron Fist (vol. 3) #1–3 (July–September 1998), by writer Dan Jurgens and penciller Jackson Guice. Also around this time, he was among the ensemble of the group series Heroes for Hire which ran 19 issues (July 1997 – January 1999).

Following a four-issue miniseries by writer Jay Faerber and penciller Jamal Igle, Iron Fist: Wolverine (November 2000 – February 2001), co-starring the X-Men character Wolverine and cover-billed as Iron Fist/Wolverine: The Return of K'un-Lun, came another solo miniseries, Iron Fist vol. 4 #1–6 (May–October 2004), by writer Jim Mullaney and penciller Kevin Lau. Subsequently, a new Iron Fist series premiered called The Immortal Iron Fist. The series was written jointly by Ed Brubaker and Matt Fraction from issues #1–14 (January 2007 – June 2008) with artists David Aja and Travel Foreman. Brubaker's writing was critically acclaimed. Fraction wrote issues #15 and 16 alone. From issue #17 (September 2008) to the series' cancellation at issue #27 (August 2009), the series was written by Duane Swierczynski and largely drawn by a returning Travel Foreman. The Immortal Iron Fist series introduced the idea that there was a lineage of Iron Fist characters preceding Rand, and chronicled some of their stories, such as the pirate queen Wu Ao-Shi in issue #7 (August 2007) and Bei Bang-Wen, who fought the British in the Second Opium War, in issue #15 (July 2008).

=== 2010s and 2020s ===
Iron Fist appeared as a regular character throughout the 2010–2013 New Avengers series, from issue #1 (August 2010) through its final issue, #34 (January 2013). In 2014, Iron Fist was given new life and set to star in a new 12-issue comic book series written and drawn by Kaare Andrews titled Iron Fist: The Living Weapon as part of the All-New Marvel NOW! event. A new volume of Power Man and Iron Fist began publication in 2016 as part of the All-New, All-Different Marvel branding, written by David F. Walker and illustrated by Sanford Greene. Brian Michael Bendis wrote The Defenders with artist David Marquez in 2017, placing Iron Fist in a team alongside Luke Cage, Jessica Jones, and Daredevil to coincide with the television adaptations of these characters.

In January 2021, Iron Fist starred in the series Iron Fist: Heart of the Dragon, written by Larry Hama with art by David Wachter. In October 2021, Marvel announced that Danny Rand will retire as Iron Fist and pass the mantle to a successor. The five-issue limited series, written by Alyssa Wong and art by Michael YG, was released in February 2022, which revealed Lin Lie as the new Iron Fist and Rand appearing in a supporting role.

Iron Fist's 50th anniversary was commemorated in the one-shot Iron Fist 50th Anniversary Special #1. Released in August 2024, the one-shot featured Danny Rand in several short stories set throughout his life that included Wolverine, Lin Lie, the Daughters of the Dragon and Heroes for Hire in supporting roles. The anniversary special featured the return of previous Iron Fist writers which included Claremont and Wong. The one-shot concluded with Rand being killed off in the final story, which was written by Jason Loo and illustrated by Whilce Portacio. Similar to the X-Men line of comics featured in the 2024 "X-Men: From the Ashes" relaunch, the special included a QR code leading to an extra digital stinger page, in which case teased a possible resurrection for Rand.

In September 2025, Rand was resurrected and made his debut as Ghost Fist in the four issue limited series The Undead Iron Fist, with Loo returning as writer and Fran Galán on art. Artist Von Randal designed Ghost Fist's costume, which included arnis sticks, armor encasing his right arm (which had been severed in the Anniversary Special) and a full cowl mask inspired by the Wildstorm and DC Comics character Grifter. Initially, Randal incorporated a dragon motif on the armor's spaulder, but editor Danny Khazem requested it be replaced. Randal ultimately settled on an eagle, which he felt better aligned with the themes of The Undead Iron Fist.

In November 2025, it was announced that The Undead Iron Fist would be followed with Deadly Hands of K'un-Lun, a five issue limited series written by Yifan Jiang and illustrated by Paco Medina, which began publishing in February 2026.

== Fictional character biography ==
=== Background ===
Danny Rand was born in New York City. His father, Wendell Rand, discovered the city of K'un-L'un as a boy. During his time in K'un-Lun, Wendell saved the life of the city's ruler, Lord Tuan, and was adopted as Tuan's son. However, Wendell chose as an adult to leave. Becoming a wealthy entrepreneur, he marries socialite Heather Duncan. Wendell organizes an expedition to again seek out K'un-Lun, taking his wife Heather, his business partner Harold Meachum and nine-year-old Danny. During the journey up the mountain, Danny slips off the path, his tie-rope taking his mother and father with him. Meachum, who also loves Heather, forces Wendell to plunge to his death but offers to rescue Heather and Danny. When she rejects him, Meachum leaves her and Danny for dead. The pair come across a rope bridge that appears out of nowhere and are attacked by savage wolves. Heather sacrifices herself to save Danny even as archers from K'un-Lun attempt to save her. The archers take the grieving Danny to see their master, Yu-Ti. When Danny expresses his desire for vengeance, Yü-Ti apprentices him to Lei Kung the Thunderer, who teaches him martial arts. Danny proves to be the most gifted of Lei Kung's students. At 19, the young man is given the chance to attain the power of the Iron Fist by fighting and defeating the dragon Shou-Lao, who guards its disembodied molten heart. Guessing that the heart provides life energy to Shou-Lao through the dragon-shaped scar on its chest, Danny covers the scar with his own body and hangs on until Shou-Lao collapses and dies, in the process burning a dragon brand into his own chest. Having killed Shou-Lao, he enters its cave and plunges his fists into a brazier containing its heart, emerging with the power of the Iron Fist.

=== Heroes for Hire ===
While working undercover, Misty Knight infiltrates the organization of crime lord John Bushmaster. When Bushmaster discovers Knight's treachery, he kidnaps Claire Temple and Noah Burstein, close associates of Luke Cage, better known as Power Man, and holds them hostage to force Cage to eliminate Knight. Iron Fist is on hand to stop him, however, and after a battle, the truth comes out. Rand helps Cage and the Daughters of the Dragon (Knight and Wing) battle Bushmaster, rescue Temple and Burstein, and obtain evidence that proves Cage's innocence of prior drug charges. Afterwards, Iron Fist and Power Man become partners, forming Heroes for Hire, Inc. Iron Fist, in his secret identity of Danny Rand, resumes control of his parents' fortune as half of Rand-Meachum, Inc., making him quite wealthy. This causes tension between Rand and Cage, who was raised poor. Power Man and Iron Fist's partnership ends when Rand is diagnosed with cancer and gets kidnapped as part of a plot masterminded by Master Khan. Just prior to a battle with the Black Dragon Chiantang (the brother of the mythical Dragon King), Danny is replaced by a doppelgänger created by the extra-dimensional H'ylthri. The double (who wears a red variant of the Iron Fist costume) is killed by Captain Hero a short time later. Cage, now the prime suspect in Rand's apparent death, becomes a fugitive.

=== Resurrection ===
While in stasis in K'un-Lun with the H'ylthri, Iron Fist manages to focus his chi, curing the cancer. He is later freed from stasis by Namor. Rand and Cage reform Heroes for Hire, Inc. with an expanded team, this time working for Namor's Oracle Corporation. Namor ultimately dissolves Oracle as well as Heroes for Hire, Inc. Iron Fist later loses his powers to Junzo Muto, the leader of the Hand, and subsequently becomes the guardian of a pack of displaced dragons in Tokyo. His powers are eventually restored by Chiantang, who brainwashes Iron Fist and forces him to battle Black Panther. Black Panther is able to free Iron Fist from the creature's control, and the two work together to defeat the Black Dragon in Wakanda. Miranda Rand also returns from the dead. The H'ylthri revive her and promise to restore her to full life if she retrieves the extra-dimensional artifact known as the Zodiac Key. To this end, she takes the identity of Death Sting, bringing her into conflict with Iron Fist as well as with S.H.I.E.L.D. When the H'ylthri try to kill Iron Fist, Miranda turns the power of the Zodiac Key against them, seemingly killing herself in the process. However, exposure to chemicals from the H'ylthri pods prevented her death.

=== Posing as Daredevil ===
Rand disguises himself as Daredevil to convince the media and the public that Matt Murdock is not the masked vigilante. During the "Civil War" storyline, he opposes the Superhuman Registration Act, joining Captain America while still pretending to be Daredevil. Rand is apprehended by Pro-Registration forces. He is later freed from the Negative Zone Prison, joining Captain America's team to battle Iron Man's forces.

=== New Avengers ===
After the arrest of Captain America, Rand joins the New Avengers, an underground group provided with secure accommodation by Doctor Strange and which includes his former teammate Luke Cage. In the public eye, Rand is able to avoid arrest with legal loopholes. Rand leaves the New Avengers, due to a variety of problems, but lets them know, if they ever need him, to give him a call. He later aids the New Avengers in locating and rescuing Cage from Norman Osborn after Cage suffered a heart attack and was summarily taken into custody as a fugitive.

=== The Immortal Iron Fist ===
Orson Randall, Danny Rand's immediate predecessor, seeks out Danny Rand in New York and gives him The Book of the Iron Fist, a sacred ledger supposedly containing all the kung fu secrets of previous Iron Fists, which Randall claims will be necessary if Rand is to compete successfully in the coming tournament of the Seven Champions. The Steel Serpent, whose powers have been greatly augmented by the Crane Mother, dispatches Randall. On the brink of death, Randall surrenders his chi to Rand, giving him sufficient power to battle the Serpent to a standstill. After the battle, Rand is summoned by his master, Lei Kung (who is also the father of Steel Serpent) to compete in a tournament that will decide the cycle according to which each of the Seven Cities of Heaven appears on Earth. However, the leaders of the Seven Cities had secretly erected gateways between Earth and each city without the knowledge of the populace. The corruption of the leaders of the Seven Cities of Heaven spurs Iron Fist, Lei Kung, Orson Randall's daughter, and John Aman to plan a revolution. Iron Fist discovers that Crane Mother and Xao, a high-ranking Hydra operative, are planning to destroy K'un-Lun by using a portal. Upon learning of the plot, Steel Serpent helps Rand and the other Immortal Weapons defeat Xao.

Rand destroys the train intended to destroy K'un-Lun by extending his chi to find the train's electromagnetic field. Meanwhile, the revolution orchestrated by Lei Kung and Orson's daughter proves successful, with Nu-an, the Yu-Ti of K'un-Lun fleeing in terror. When Rand confronts Xao, Xao reveals that there is an eighth city of Heaven before killing himself. Rand suggests Lei Kung as the new Yu-Ti, with Orson's unnamed daughter as the new Thunderer.

After learning that the Randall fortune that started Rand International was formed from the oppression of the Cities of Heaven, Rand decides to transform the company into a non-profit organization, dedicated to helping the poor. He also sets up the Thunder Dojo in Harlem to help inner-city children, buys back the old Heroes for Hire building as the new Rand International Headquarters and his new home, while offering Luke Cage a position at the company. He also tries to reconnect with Misty Knight. Rand, on his 33rd birthday, learns every single one of the previous Iron Fists died at the age of 33, except Orson Randall, who vanished at that time. Soon afterward, Rand is attacked and defeated by Zhou Cheng, a servant of Ch'i-Lin, who claims to have killed the Iron Fists in order to enter K'un-Lun and devour the egg that births the next incarnation of Shou-Lao every generation, thus wiping out K'un-Lun's Iron Fist legacy. Luke, Misty, and Colleen Wing arrive and save Rand. Rand has his shoulder dislocated during a second battle with Cheng, but manages to defeat Cheng even in his weakened state. Following the duel, the Immortal Weapons, Luke, Colleen, and Misty arrive, and reveal to Rand that they have discovered a map in Cheng's apartment that leads to the Eighth City of Heaven. Rand and the others realize that this is where Ch'i-Lin originated, and depart for the Eighth City.

In the Eighth City, he meets Quan Yaozu, the first Iron Fist, who became disillusioned with K'un-Lun and rose up to rule the Eighth City as Changming. Rand and Fat Cobra manage to defeat Quan. Rand's actions during their battles impress Quan, who decides that Rand may be living proof that K'un-Lun is not the corrupt city it once was. Rand and Davos agree to guide Quan to K'un-Lun and arrange a meeting between him and Lei-Kung to give Quan a forum for his grievances. However, when Rand returns to New York, he finds a Hydra cell waiting for him at Rand International, seeking retribution for the death of Xao, and holding Misty hostage. In the ensuing battle, Rand International is destroyed, but Rand and Misty escape unharmed. Now left with only a fraction of his former net worth, Rand and Misty purchase a new condo in Harlem, and Rand decides to focus all of his attention and remaining resources at the Thunder Dojo. While moving into their new home, Rand asks Misty to marry him. Initially skeptical of the offer, Misty accepts and reveals that she is pregnant with Rand's child.

=== Avengers reform ===
In the aftermath of Siege, Rand joins the newly reformed New Avengers. After finding out that Misty's pregnancy was false, Misty and Danny decide to move out of their apartment and live separately, but continue their relationship. During the "Shadowland" storyline, Danny later has an encounter with someone who is going by the name of Power Man. He and Luke Cage discover that the Power Man is Victor Alvarez, a survivor of a building that Bullseye blew up. Iron Fist becomes the new Power Man's mentor and the two become a team. During the "Fear Itself" storyline, Iron Fist and the Immortal Weapons are summoned to Beijing to close the gates of the Eighth City that are on the verge of opening. However, Danny is placed under mind control which creates a mystical interference with the ability of the Immortal Weapons to close the gate. He is then forced to battle his allies. Thanks to War Machine knocking him out, the mission is completed successfully. However, Doctor Strange realizes that Iron Fist is now an Immortal Weapon of Agamotto. During the "Avengers vs. X-Men" storyline, Iron Fist and Lei Kung bring Hope Summers to K'un-Lun to train as an Iron Fist, in order to defeat the Phoenix Force-possessed X-Men.

=== Marvel NOW! ===
In Iron Fist: The Living Weapon, Iron Fist is approached by a young monk named Pei, who tells him to return to K'un-Lun. Upon returning, Iron Fist discovers the city in ruins and Lei Kung dead at the hands of the One, a chi-powered robot who believed itself to be Danny's father Wendell Rand. Iron Fist is defeated by the One, but is rescued by his childhood friend Sparrow and the One's creator Fooh, who nurse him back to health and warn him that the One and Davos were working together to turn New York into New K'un-Lun. During Iron Fist's and the One's second confrontation, the One opens an artificial portal between Earth and the Heavens in an attempt to retrieve Wendell's deceased wife Heather Rand from the afterlife, the but Xian fire god Zhu Rong emerges in Manhattan to punish the mortals for upsetting the universal order. By focusing his chi energy into his fist and launching himself into Zhu Rong, Iron Fist defeats the fire god. Meanwhile, Davos attempts to take the power of the Iron Fist from a reborn Shou-Lao, but is stopped by Pei, who gains the power of the Iron Fist to defeat Davos and revive Shou-Lao, naming his adolescent reborn form "Gork". As the youngest person to ever bear the mark of the Iron Fist, Pei is subsequently taken in by Danny as his ward. In the Marvel NOW! era, Iron Fist rejoins Luke Cage as the Heroes for Hire, having been employed by Boomerang to arrest his former colleagues in the Sinister Six.

=== All-New, All-Different Marvel ===
In the All-New, All-Different Marvel era, Rand and Cage are forced to return to crime fighting after former Heroes for Hire secretary Jennifer "White Jennie" Royce becomes embroiled in a gang war with Black Mariah against Tombstone. After that is dealt with, Power Man and Iron Fist once again take to the streets as the Heroes for Hire.

Meanwhile, Rand continues mentoring Pei as her Thunderer while struggling with raising her as both his pupil and legal guardian. While investigating several disappearances in Chinatown, Iron Fist uncovers a conspiracy involving a demonic takeover of Earth by the demon overlord Mara, resulting in a confrontation with the demon and his daughters at Pei's school, who in their human disguises had attempted to drive a wedge between Rand and Pei. The two Iron Fists are able to defeat the demons but Pei is pulled into Mara's home dimension. Using the Book of the Iron Fist, master and student are able to work together to summon Pei back to Earth.

During the "Secret Empire" storyline, Iron Fist became a member of the Defenders alongside Daredevil, Luke Cage, and Jessica Jones. They, alongside Cloak and Dagger, Doctor Strange, and Spider-Woman, fought the Army of Evil during Hydra's takeover of the United States where they were defeated by Nitro. Iron Fist and those with him were trapped in the Darkforce dome by Blackout when his powers were enhanced by Baron Helmut Zemo using the Darkhold.

Finding himself disconnected from K'un-Lun and struggling with summoning his chi, Iron Fist participates in several underground fights around the world to reawaken his powers but to no avail. He is approached by Chosin, a representative of the mystical island of Liu-Shi, and is offered to participate in a tournament that can restore his power. Iron Fist accepts and travels to Liu-Shi, where he must fight against seven champions scattered throughout the island. However, Iron Fist discovers that Liu-Shi is made up of exiles and dissidents from K'un-Lun, and the tournament is a ruse conducted by Choshin and the other members of Liu-Shi's council to steal Rand's dormant powers for themselves and use them to overthrow K'un-Lun and replace it with Liu-Shi. With the help of some sympathetic masters, Iron Fist prevents Chosin's scheme and manages to face his final opponent: Shu-Hu, the original One. Rand eventually reawakens his powers and defeats Shu-Hu, who acknowledges him as a worthy Iron Fist.

Upon returning home, Iron Fist discovers that the Book of the Iron Fist has been stolen from his penthouse by the new Constrictor. Iron Fist recruits Sabretooth, the original one's former partner, to track down Constrictor and recover the Book before he can sell it Choshin. A battle between Constrictor and the Serpent Society and Choshin and his forces over the Book commences when the two parties argue over payment but despite Iron Fist's and Sabretooth's interference, Choshin takes and the Book and uses it to open a portal to K'un-Lun for invasion. Iron Fist returns to K'un-Lun with Sabretooth and a resurrected incarnation of Shou-Lao to defend K'un-Lun from Choshin.

During the events of Damnation, Iron Fist is recruited by Wong into the Midnight Sons to stop Mephisto in Las Vegas. After being separated from the Midnight Sons, Iron Fist is found by Fat Cobra, who takes him to a fight tournament where the star fighter is Orson, who accepted a deal with the fight promoter D'Kay to return to the living in exchange for participating in D'Kay's fights. Rand and Fat Cobra decide to help Orson escape by fighting alongside him, but D'Kay summons the souls of Rand's sister Miranda and Fat Cobra's mother and forces them to participate as well. While fighting D'Kay and his champions, Orson sacrifices himself to help Rand and the others escape. After sending Miranda, Fat Cobra, and his mother to his penthouse, Rand reunites with the Midnight Sons to defeat Mephisto.

=== Heart of the Dragon ===
The dragons of the Heavenly Cities are being targeted by armies of undead ninjas and several villains, including Taskmaster, Lady Bullseye and Midnight Sun for their hearts, resulting in the deaths of many dragons and Tiger's Beautiful Daughter, prompting Iron Fist to team up with Luke, Pei, Gork, Fooh and the remaining Immortal Weapons to save the other dragons. At the urging of the Xian goddess of Mercy Quan Yin, Iron Fist and the others use Fooh's portal technology to manifest the Heavenly Cities on Earth so that other heroes, including Okoye and Sunspot, can join in the defense against the hordes of zombies and villains. When the zombies prove too much for them, Iron Fist and the group retreat to the Heart of Heaven, where they come across Okoye killing the dragon of the Heart of Heaven, who takes advantage of their shock to kill the newly rescued dragon of the Kingdom of Spiders as well; Okoye explains that she was told to kill them by Quan Yin and the Heart of Heaven's dragon in order to secure the cosmic balance, thus gaining the power of both dragons. Yama Dragonsbane, Danny's former lover Brenda Swanson, subsequently appears in the Heart of Heaven and reveals herself to be behind the dragon killings in order to use their hearts to empower her master, the Hierophant, who is also summoned to the Heart of Heaven. While Fooh distracts the Hierophant, Iron Fist and the others travel to the Eighth City to destroy the Hierophant's undead army but are attacked by the city's Ghost Dragon. When the Ghost Dragon proves impossible to harm, Pei and Gork reluctantly allow Okoye to kill Gork for his heart, knowing that he and the other dragons can be revived if she can defeat the Hierophant. With Pei's and Gork's powers, Okoye is able to kill the Ghost Dragon and claim his power. When the Hierophant arrives, Danny transfers the Iron Fist to Okoye, granting her the full power of the Heavenly Cities. Okoye uses her combined dragon chi to defeat the Hierophant and Dragonsbane while Iron Fist and the others finish off the remaining undead. The Hierophant's death releases the hearts of the dragons slain by him and Okoye back to their respective Cities, although the Iron Fist powers of Danny, Pei and Gork remain with Okoye. Okoye attempts to return the Iron Fist back to Danny, who refuses, declaring that Okoye is the new Iron Fist. Due to her obligations to Wakanda, Okoye refuses and instead transfers the Iron Fist to Gork's newly reborn egg, leaving the title and power vacant. Despite being powerless, an undeterred Danny declares to Luke that he will "live [life] to the fullest".

=== Devil's Reign ===
During the "Devil's Reign" storyline, Mayor Wilson Fisk outlaws superhero vigilantism in New York City. Despite his retirement as Iron Fist, Danny is apprehended at his office by NYPD officers led by Thunderbolts member Crossbones. Danny attempts to fight them off but is overpowered and incarcerated in the Myrmidon along with others targeted by the new law. Danny, Moon Knight, and Tony Stark are able to escape with the help of Sue Storm and Reed Richards. After Fisk is defeated and Luke is elected mayor of New York City, Danny accompanies Luke on several of his first outings as mayor.

=== Meeting the New Iron Fist ===
While a powerless Danny fights several demons attacking a Chinese antique shop in Flushing for a mysterious green shard, he is helped by Lin Lie - formerly the superhero Sword Master - who succeeded Danny as the new Iron Fist. After they defeat the demons and recover the shard, Danny attempts to question Lie about his background and offers his help, but Lie rebuffs him and flees with the shard through a portal in a nearby subway back to K'un-Lun. Danny enlists Fat Cobra and the Bride of Nine Spiders with tracking down the new Iron Fist, eventually finding him in Gansu. When an army the same demons from Flushing appear, Danny, Luke and the Immortal Weapons join forces with Lie and his friends to fight them. When Sparrow and her best warriors are summoned by Danny for backup, the demons' leader and Lie's brother, Lin Feng, uses the opportunity to steal Sparrow's portal to K'un-Lun to find the final tomb of his master Chiyou, leaving the K'un-Lun citizenry trapped on Earth. Danny offers housing to the displaced citizens and formally introduces himself to Lie. Danny compliments Lie's acquired skills and offers to complete his training; Lie readily accepts.

=== Death ===
After a night out celebrating his 34th birthday with Luke and Jeryn Hogarth, Danny is ambushed at his penthouse by the same Ch'i-Lin that previously attempted to kill him on his 33rd birthday and has now possessed the body of Razor Fist. Due to the Ch'i-Lin confusing Danny with an illusion-making mist and having hired the Shocker to keep Lie and Pei preoccupied, a powerless Danny is overwhelmed and killed by the Ch'i-Lin. Danny is given a Buddhist funeral at Calvary Cemetery, which is attended by Luke, Lie and many of his close friends and former teammates. Weeks after his death, a purple skeletal hand emerges from Danny's grave.

=== The Undead Iron Fist ===
After his death, Danny's spirit is sent to the Duat and reunites with Orson, who reveals that everything the Book of the Iron Fist taught them was a lie. Orson explains that Quan Yaozu was behind the deaths of every Iron Fist to siphon their chi for himself but Danny has a chance to be resurrected into the mortal world if he takes down Quan. Osiris agrees to make Danny his avatar but he must undergo a trial to destroy Quan before a tapestry representing his soul burns away. Otherwise, Danny's spirit will be permanently bound to the underworld. After months training under Osiris, Danny is resurrected as an undead being and bestowed with new powers as the Ghost Fist.

== Powers and abilities ==
Plunging his fists into the molten heart of the dragon Shou-Lao infused the dragon's superhuman energy into Rand. This, along with being trained by Lei Kung the Thunderer, gave Rand the power of the Iron Fist, allowing him to summon and focus his chi energy (also called natural energy or life-force energy) to enhance his natural abilities to extraordinary levels. His strength, speed, stamina, durability, agility, reflexes, and senses can all be greatly intensified, almost comparable to superhuman levels.

He is able to concentrate his own chi and the superhuman energy from Shou-Lao's heart into his hand, with it manifesting as a supernatural glow around his hand and fist. So concentrated, this "iron fist" can strike with superhuman hardness and impact, while his hand becomes impervious to pain and injury. Some of Rand's feats with the "iron fist" is knocking out Luke Cage, knocking out a drunken Hercules, almost defeating Black Panther before ultimately losing, and taking down the S.H.I.E L.D Helicarrier with a single punch. However, summoning the power required by this feat leaves Rand physically and mentally drained, unable to repeat the act for a time, as long as an entire day in certain instances, though after years of using the ability, it has become less draining. He can focus his chi inward to heal himself or outward to heal others of injury, as well as to give himself psychic senses and to telepathically fuse his consciousness with another person when looking directly into the pupil of his eye.

Rand is also a skilled acrobat, gymnast, and a master of all of K'un-Lun's martial arts, as well as various fighting styles from Earth, including Shaolin Kung Fu, Aikido, Fujian White Crane, Judo, Karate, Muay Thai, Ninjutsu, Wushu, and Wing Chun.

After relinquishing his Iron Fist powers and being killed by the Ch'i-Lin, Danny was resurrected as the Ghost Fist and bestowed with new powers by Osiris, which allow him to channel a mystical purple aura that acts similarly to the chi of Shou-Lao. In addition to using this energy to empower his hands like the Iron Fist, Danny can also project it as destructive energy blasts and use it to create energy weapons such as nunchaku. Danny can sense and see supernatural or demonic forces that are normally undetectable to humans. He can also make his body intangible and emit sonic waves.

== Other characters named Iron Fist ==
=== Fan Fei ===
In 1,000,000 BC, a K'un-Lun native named Fan Fei was born to the Green Lotus House and had taken a fascination with the cavemen that lived outside K'un-Lun; going so far as to train a few of them in secret. After she was exposed, Fan Fei was chained up and forced to watch as her students were fed to Shou-Lao by Lei Kung. When she broke out, in the hopes that she will die fighting Shou-Lao, Fan Fei punched the dragon in his chest tattoo and gained his powers. Lei Kung had Fan Fei exiled from K'un-Lun, believing Shou-Lao was dead.

=== Quan Yaozu ===
One of the first Iron Fists, Quan Yaozu was sent to the Eighth City to imprison the demonic creatures sent from there that had been plaguing K'un-Lun and the other Heavenly Cities, voluntarily staying behind to prevent them from escaping. When the Yu-Ti of K'un-Lun began using the Eighth City to imprison citizens who threatened his rule, including innocents, Quan became disillusioned with K'un-Lun and eventually took control of the Eighth City, ruling it as "Changming". Quan would orchestrate the death of subsequent Iron Fists, including Danny Rand, to siphon their chi for himself. After Rand returns as the Ghost Fist, he kills Quan.

=== Li Park ===
In 730 A.D., a pacifist named Li Park became the new Iron Fist, who sought to resolve conflict by avoiding direct conflict. As a local village battled with a Chinese general intent on conquering K'un-Lun, which had been struck by a plague, Li utilized his newly discovered hypnotic fist technique to dissuade the soldiers. When his technique failed to save the villagers, Li put aside his pacifism and used more aggressive actions. Ultimately, Li was able to rescue the remaining villagers and led them to K'un-Lun, where they helped repopulate the city.

=== Gale ===
During the 11th century, the outlaw Atlantean princess Gale wielded the powers of the Iron Fist. She was part of Thor's incarnation of the Avengers.

=== Bei-Ming Tian ===
Bei Ming-Tian was the Iron Fist circa 1227 AD. He protected his village from the invading Mongol Army and even slew Genghis Khan himself in battle.

=== Wu Ao-Shi ===
In 1545 A.D., a young protégé of Lei Kung named Wu Ao-Shi defeated Shou-Lao and claimed the power of the Iron Fist for herself. During her training, she fell in love and became betrothed to a fisherman, who became distraught at the violence destined for the Iron Fist and left her and K'un-Lun once the city merged with Earth; Wu followed shortly after to search for her love. During her travels, Wu made a living as a mercenary and took on a job to liberate Pinghai Bay from Wokou pirates, but was defeated and imprisoned. Wu was rescued by her beloved, and killed the pirates by infusing her chi into an arrow, turning it into an explosive projective. Wu and the fisherman spent their remaining years together in the liberated territory, with Wu later becoming known as the Pirate Queen of Pinghai Bay.

=== Fongji Wu ===
Centuries ago, the Yu-Ti Nu-An had a recurring dream associating a red-haired girl with the Phoenix and a dragon. He later finds a matching red-haired girl named Fongji Wu in the streets of K'un-Lun and has her trained as the Iron Fist. Nu-An asks for Leonardo da Vinci to come to K'un-Lun in order to help protect the world against the Phoenix's arrival; meanwhile, Fongji is submitted to a hard training, eventually manifesting Phoenix powers. Nu-An orders her to battle Shou-Lao as established by the ritual of the Iron Fist. Fongji is successful in her test and becomes the Iron Fist, shortly before Leonardo sees the Phoenix coming towards Earth. Fongji is able to bond with the Phoenix and remain in control of herself, but she feels that Earth is still not ready for its evolution and departs.

=== Bei Bang-Wen ===
Sometime in the mid-19th century, an Iron Fist known as Bei Bang-Wen developed an Iron Fist technique known as the Perfect Strategy Mind, which let him use the chi of Shou-Lao in more intellectual ways but also left him overconfident. In 1860, Bei assisted the Chinese against the British and French forces during the Second Opium War. Bei eventually returned home to K'un-Lun, relinquishing his powers so that the cycle of the Iron Fist could begin again and took a wife who bore him thirteen sons.

=== Kwai Jun-Fan ===
Bei Bang-Wen's successor to the Iron Fist, Kwai Jun-Fan ventured the Wild West of Texas circa 1878 AD, where he was killed by Zhou Cheng under the influence of Ch'i-Lin.

=== Wong Fei-hung ===
At one point, the folk hero Wong Fei-hung became the Iron Fist and combined his powers with Drunken boxing, creating a technique called the "Drunken Dragon Fist".

By 1924, he had retired the mantle but still retained his powers. He and the Ghost Rider Knuckles O'Shaugnessy defended Hong Kong from Mephisto with help from the time-displaced Avengers.

=== Resourceful Snake ===
At an unknown point, the man simply known as Resourceful Snake was able to defeat and claim the heart of Shou-Lao. However, after losing his final trial to the One, he was punished for his hubris by having his arms severed and being stripped of his title.

=== Orson Randall ===
Born and raised in K'un-Lun after his parents' airship crashed in the city in the late 19th century, Orson Randall became the Iron Fist after besting Shou-Lao when he was seventeen years old, becoming the first Westerner to do so. During World War I, Randall joined the Freedom's Five along with Union Jack, Phantom Eagle, Crimson Cavalier and Sir Steel. The bloodshed Randall witnessed in the war deeply traumatized him, causing him to turn to drugs to escape. While in hiding, Randall met young orphan Wendell Rand and adopted him as his ward. During another encounter with the Steel Serpent, Randall is mortally wounded and transfers his chi to Danny Rand before dying.

=== Pei ===
A young monk of K'un-Lun, Pei fled from the city when Davos and the One staged a coup, taking the unhatched egg of the latest incarnation of Shou-Lao with her. Pei was able to find Danny in New York and told him to go back to save Kun-L'un. While under her care, the egg prematurely hatches into an adolescent dragon, whom Pei names Gork. When Davos catches up to them and kills Gork, Pei inadvertently ends up with the power of the Iron Fist, using its power to defeat Davos and revive Gork and all previous incarnations of Shou-Lao. During the Hierophant's attacks on the dragons of the Heavenly Cities, Pei reluctantly allows Okoye to sacrifice Gork and transfers her Iron Fist power to empower Okoye. While Danny is away on a business trip, he sends Pei a mystical K'un-Lun medallion that gives her abilities similar to her lost Iron Fist powers.

=== Wah Sing-Rand ===
In an alternate timeline set in the 31st century, Wah Sing-Rand, a K'un-Lun native and Danny's possible descendant, defeats Shou-Lao, becoming one of the youngest Iron Fists in history. While traveling to the planet Yaochi to free it from the tyrannical President Xing, his shuttle is frozen in a temporal pocket, leaving him trapped for 24 years. In circa 3099 AD., he was able to defeat Xing and liberate Yaochi at the cost of his own life.

== Supporting characters ==
In the 1970s, Danny Rand's long-term girlfriend is Misty Knight and he is close friends with Colleen Wing; Knight and Wing work together as the Daughters of the Dragon. Iron Fist is closely tied to the character Luke Cage. They were brought together for the shared series Power Man and Iron Fist in 1978 where they came to be partners. Cage formed a team, the Defenders, with Iron Fist, Jessica Jones, and Daredevil. Iron Fist has worked with other teams, including the New Avengers.

== Reception ==
Iron Fist is ranked as the 195th-greatest comic book character of all time by Wizard magazine. IGN also ranked Iron Fist as the 68th-greatest comic book hero of all time stating that in the Marvel Universe, mastery of martial arts is enough to qualify as a superpower, and none are more "super" at the art of fighting than Iron Fist, and as #46 on their list of the "Top 50 Avengers".

=== Controversy ===
The story of Iron Fist has been criticized for cultural appropriation and orientalism. Following his first appearance in 1975, William F. Wu wrote to Marvel to point out that "Marvel continues to turn away from Asian protagonists, even when the heart of the storyline is Asian in basis." Troy D. Smith writes that "Iron Fist was just the latest in a long line of 'white savior' heroes to have gained their training and/or superpowers in the 'mysterious Orient'". Rob Bricken of io9 summarizes Danny Rand as a clichéd "white guy [who] discovers a foreign culture, learns its ways, and becomes better at it than the people born into it". Upon the announcement of the television series, an online movement was started to change Iron Fist into an Asian-American character to subvert offensive tropes while providing some depth to the character. Supporters of the movement included comic writer Gail Simone, who acknowledged she was a fan of Iron Fist but agreed that the character should be changed to Asian-American. The role ultimately went to English actor Finn Jones, whose performance was panned by critics, along with the series' depiction of Asian culture during its first season.

Roy Thomas, co-creator of Iron Fist, defended the character in response to criticism, arguing that Iron Fist was created for a less "PC" time. While Thomas added that he would not be bothered if Iron Fist had been changed to Asian-American, he was not "ashamed" for making Rand white. Comic book creator Rob Liefeld also defended the character, denying that Rand's story was racist and argued that changing his race to Asian was "reverse whitewashing". Other commentators have echoed similar sentiments; while acknowledging that Rand's origins were problematic, some felt that changing him to Asian would reinforce the stereotype of Asians being proficient in martial arts.

In an apparent response to the controversy, Marvel announced in 2021 that a new, younger Iron Fist of Asian descent would be introduced in a new comic series helmed by an Asian creative team. Writer Alyssa Wong explained that it was "impossible to be unaware of the controversy", and took this into consideration when writing the series. While noting that there had been Iron Fists of Asian descent before, Wong pointed out that all of them were supporting characters in Rand's story or long dead, arguing that the new Iron Fist was an important step forward for the title and the ongoing push for diversity. Wong also acknowledged Rand's sizeable fanbase despite criticisms, reassuring that he would play an important role for the new Iron Fist and that the new series would not "erase" Rand's history and legacy but instead build upon it. The new series, which revealed the Chinese superhero Sword Master as the new Iron Fist, has since received critical acclaim.

=== Awards ===
The Immortal Iron Fist was nominated for a 2008 Eisner Award for Best New Series. Ed Brubaker won the 2008 Eisner Award for Best Writer in part for his work on this series.

== In other media ==
Multiple versions of Iron Fist, primarily Danny Rand, have appeared in media outside comics. Rand was first adapted into television in The Super Hero Squad Show, where he was voiced by Mikey Kelley and appeared as a member of Heroes for Hire. Rand has also appeared in The Avengers: Earth's Mightiest Heroes, voiced by Loren Lester. Greg Cipes voiced Rand in Ultimate Spider-Man, Avengers Assemble, and Lego Marvel Super Heroes: Maximum Overload. Go Shinomiya voiced Iron Fist in the anime series Marvel Disk Wars: The Avengers and Marvel Future Avengers, with Liam O'Brien and Johnny Yong Bosch respectively voicing Iron Fist in the English dubs of the series.

Finn Jones as Danny Rand in the Netflix series Iron Fist

Danny Rand / Iron Fist appears in Marvel's Netflix television series, portrayed by Finn Jones as an adult and Toby Nichols as an adolescent. In addition, a young Kwai Jun-Fan appears in the What If...? episode "What If... 1872?", voiced by Allen Deng. Jorani, an original character based on Iron Fist, appears in Eyes of Wakanda, voiced by Jona Xiao.

The Danny Rand incarnation of Iron Fist has appeared in various video games. Rand first appeared as an assist character in Spider-Man and Venom: Maximum Carnage. The character has also appeared in The Amazing Spider-Man: Lethal Foes, Spider-Man: Friend or Foe, Marvel: Ultimate Alliance 2, Marvel vs. Capcom 3: Fate of Two Worlds, Ultimate Marvel vs. Capcom 3, Marvel Avengers Alliance, LittleBigPlanet, Marvel Heroes, Lego Marvel Super Heroes, Disney Infinity 2.0, Marvel Contest of Champions, Disney Infinity 3.0, Lego Marvel's Avengers, Marvel: Future Fight, Marvel Puzzle Quest, Lego Marvel Super Heroes 2, and Marvel Ultimate Alliance 3: The Black Order. The Lin Lie incarnation of Iron Fist appears as a playable character in Marvel Rivals, voiced by Stephen Fu.
