= The Deadly Hands of Kung Fu =

American black-and-white martial arts comics magazine

- The Deadly Hands of Kung Fu #17 (Oct. 1975), painted cover art by Neal Adams.
- Editor: Various
- Categories: Martial arts comics
- Frequency: Monthly
- Founded: 1974
- Final issue Number: 1977; 33
- Company: Magazine Management
- Country: United States

The Deadly Hands of Kung Fu is an American black-and-white martial arts comics magazine published by Magazine Management, a corporate sibling of Marvel Comics. A total of 33 issues were published from 1974 to 1977, plus one special edition.

== Publishing history ==
The Deadly Hands of Kung Fu was published in the mid-to-late 1970s by Magazine Management, a corporate sibling of Marvel Comics, amid the martial arts movie fad of the time. Launched in 1974 as part of Magazine Management's line of black-and-white comics magazines, it ran 33 issues through 1977. Recurring characters included:

- The Sons of the Tiger: Three men and one woman linked by mystical amulets.
- The White Tiger: Heir to the amulets of the Sons of the Tiger.
- Shang Chi, Master of Kung Fu (from Marvel Comics), incorporating characters and concepts licensed from the Sax Rohmer estate.
- Iron Fist the Living Weapon (from Marvel Comics)
- The Daughters of the Dragon: Colleen Wing and Misty Knight (characters derived from Marvel Comics' Iron Fist series).

Each issue had comics stories featuring these characters, both single-issue stories and multi-issue story arcs. Most issues also included a review of a recent martial arts film. Other issues had interviews with martial arts instructors, while others had interviews with film or television celebrities related to martial arts.

Early issues had a martial arts instructional section which described some elementary fighting techniques. These were provided by comics illustrator/martial artist Frank McLaughlin. The magazine was in black-and-white except for the cover. The cost of the magazine was 75 cents for issues #1–14. Issue #15 was a Super Annual (all reprints) issue and cost $1.25. Issues #16–33 were $1.00, as well as the 1974 Kung Fu Special (summer 1974); cover-titled Special Album Edition: The Deadly Hands of Kung Fu. Issue #28 (Sept. 1976) was an all-Bruce Lee special, including a 35-page comic book format biography written by Martin Sands, and drawn by Joe Staton and Tony DeZuniga.

Some stories were set in feudal Japan and starring samurai-type characters, including a four-part story arc called "Sword Quest", illustrated by Sanho Kim (first manhwa artist working to be published regularly in the United States) and Tony DeZuniga. The Sons of the Tiger/White Tiger feature ran until the penultimate issue.

== Revivals and Homages ==
In 2009, the black and white one-shot Shang-Chi: Master of Kung Fu was published, with stories written by Jonathan Hickman, Mike Benson, Charlie Huston and Robin Furth and illustrated by Tomm Coker, C.P. Smith, Enrique Romero and Paul Gulacy.

In 2011, Shang-Chi, Iron Fist, and the Immortal Weapons appeared in Spider-Island: Deadly Hands of Kung Fu, a three-issue miniseries written by Antony Johnston and illustrated by Sebastian Fiumara and Leandro Fernández, which was tied into the Spider-Island crossover event.

In 2014, the title was revived as the miniseries Deadly Hands of Kung Fu, written by Mike Benson and illustrated by Tan Eng Huat. The miniseries starred Shang-Chi as the main character, with the Sons of the Tiger and the Daughters of the Dragon in supporting roles.

In 2023, Shang-Chi and the Five Weapons Society appeared in Deadly Hands of Kung Fu: Gang War, a three issue miniseries written by Greg Pak and illustrated by Caio Majado, which was part of the "Gang War" crossover event.

In November 2025, Deadly Hands of K'un-Lun was announced, a five issue limited series written by Yifan Jiang and illustrated by Paco Medina, which debuted in February 2026. The series stars the current Iron Fist Lin Lie as well as former Iron Fists Danny Rand and Pei as Lie unites a team of the world's greatest martial artists to save the city of K'un-L'un from his brother Lin Feng.

== Editors ==
- Roy Thomas: #1, 2
- Tony Isabella: #3–6 and Special Album Edition
- David Anthony Kraft: #9, 10 (co-edited with Don McGregor)
- Don McGregor: #7, 8, 10 (co-edited with David Anthony Kraft), 11, 16, 17
- Archie Goodwin: #12–15, 18–25
- John Warner: #26–33

== The Deadliest Heroes of Kung Fu ==
Magazine Management also published one issue of an offshoot magazine, The Deadliest Heroes of Kung Fu, in 1975. It contained no comics elements, but featured a lengthy article reprinted from Deadly Hands as well as instructional features by Frank McLaughlin. Editor John Warner explained that The Deadliest Heroes of Kung Fu was a trial balloon for an all-articles companion to Deadly Hands.

== Collected editions ==
- The Deadly Hands of Kung Fu Omnibus Vol. 1 collects The Deadly Hands of Kung Fu #1-18, The Deadly Hands of Kung Fu Special Album Edition, and The Deadliest Heroes of Kung Fu, 1,152 pages, November 15, 2016, ISBN 978-1302901332
- The Deadly Hands of Kung Fu Omnibus Vol. 2 collects The Deadly Hands of Kung Fu #19-33 and material from Bizarre Adventures #25, 1,000 pages, June 20, 2017, ISBN 1302901346
