= Deadly Hands of K'un-Lun =

Comic book series by Marvel Comics

- Cover of Deadly Hands of K'un-Lun #1 (February 2026) by Leinil Francis Yu

Publication information
- Publisher: Marvel Comics
- Schedule: Monthly
- Format: Limited series
- Genre: Superhero
- Publication date: February 18, 2026 – June 17, 2026
- No. of issues: 5
- Main character(s): Iron Fist; Pei; Ghost Fist; Shou-Lao; Lin Feng; Chiyou; Loki

Creative team
- Written by: Yifan Jiang
- Artist(s): Paco Medina; Alessandro Miracolo
- Letterer: Cory Petit
- Colorist(s): Ceci De La Cruz; Yen Nitro
- Editor: Mark Paniccia

Deadly Hands of K'un-Lun is an American comic book published by Marvel Comics. The five-issue limited series–written by Yifan Jiang, and illustrated by Paco Medina and Alessandro Miracolo–began publication on February 18, 2026, and ended on June 17 of the same year.

The series received positive reviews from critics.

== Plot ==
After taking over K'un-Lun, (Note: As depicted in the limited series Iron Fist vol. 6 (2022)) Lin Feng–along with his recruits Steel Serpent, Neon Dragon, and Tiger's Faithful Daughter–leads his Dark Army to destroy the Seven Heavenly Cities, killing most of the Immortal Weapons in the process. Feng fails to find the last soul orb of Chiyou, which he needs to revive the dark god, but his ally Loki reassures him that the orb is in K'un-Lun. Secretly plotting against Feng, Loki appears at the underworld and informs Osiris of Feng's plans. Osiris orders the former Iron Fist Danny Rand, who has since become Osiris' avatar Ghost Fist, (Note: As depicted in the limited series The Undead Iron Fist (2025)) to leave the underworld to stop Chiyou's revival.

A date between Lin Lie, the current Iron Fist, and White Fox at an aquarium in Monterey is interrupted by a kaiju attack, which the two quell together. Upon arriving back at his hideout in New York City, Lie is reprimanded by Fooh for misusing his teleportation technology and gets into an argument with Pei over Feng's motives and Lie's failure in upholding Danny's legacy as the new Iron Fist. Struggling to reconnect with Shou-Lao since he last contacted him, Iron Fist investigates an anomaly Fooh detects in Hell's Kitchen, where he comes across Neon Dragon fighting Daredevil and White Tiger and helps the two heroines fight off the villain. Upon teleporting back to K'un-Lun, Neon Dragon warns Feng that Lie is in New York, which Feng had been preparing to invade. Not wanting to delay his plans, Feng empowers Neon Dragon to open a portal from K'un-Lun over the New York skyline, which causes the shards in Lie's arms to send him in agonizing pain, and has Steel Serpent lead his army of War Fists in attacking the city.

Fighting through the pain, Lie discovers the Steel Serpent and the War Fists have been imbued with the power of the Iron Fist that has been tainted by Chiyou's magic. Fooh arrives as backup and supplies Lie, Daredevil and White Tiger with weapons against the War Fists. Meanwhile, Pei and White Fox use the Randall Gate to teleport to K'un-Lun, but are met with resistance by forces led by Faithful and includes Yu-Ti Sparrow–who is now under the influence of Chiyou after she and her resistance army failed to stop Feng. Loki returns to the K'un-Lun throne room to check on Feng's progress and Feng begins suspecting Loki's loyalty. Iron Fist and the others realize that Steel Serpent and his forces are stalling them and are focusing their attention towards a mysterious building in the city; the building is revealed to be the Third Tower of Wisdom of the Inhumans which contains a portal Attilan, which Feng had been targeting for conquest. Despite the efforts of Iron Fist, his allies and the Friends of the Tower, Steel Serpent manages to reach the portal but is stopped by Karnak and Aero.

Enraged, Feng summons his remaining forces in K'un-Lun to invade New York, giving Pei and White Fox an opportunity to escape. The two encounter the remaining members of Sparrow's resistance, who give Pei Shou-Lao's reborn but sterile egg. After formulating a plan with Karnak, Lie, Aero, Daredevil and White Tiger invade Neon Dragon's portal while Karnak and Fooh remain behind to secure the area. With help from the Tiger God, the group enters the partially summoned Tower of K'un-Lun, which links New York and K'un-Lun together. When Feng appears at the tower, Lie orders the others to continue without him while he fights his brother. Feng uses his sorcery to extract the shards of the Sword of Fu Xi from Lie's arms, which he forges into the Sword of Chiyou and severs Lie's right arm with.

Before Feng can finish off Lie, he is saved by White Fox and Pei, who have brought the remaining resistance and Shou-Lao's egg with them. Ghost Fist then appears and summons the ghosts of the Immortal Weapons, now called the Ascended Weapons, quickly turning the tide of the battle in Lie's favor; the presence of all three Iron Fists reawakens Shou-Lao within his egg and reestablishes his connection with Lie. Lie's allies defeat Faithful and Neon, destroying the portal between New York and K'un-Lun and freeing the enthralled War Fists.

Desperate and goaded by Chiyou's voice, Feng then reveals the third soul orb, which he kept purposefully hidden from Loki, and uses it to summon Chiyou, who then uses Feng's body as a host and reshapes into an image of himself; Faithful sacrifices herself to complete Chiyou's resurrection while Neon flees the battle in terror. Fooh informs Lie that the he would need to gather more chi to both open the Randall Gate in New York and to stop Chiyou. Against Danny's and Shou-Lao's warnings as the process will likely kill him, Lie has the War Fists give him their chi, transforming him into a demigod and restoring his right arm, and prepares to face off against Chiyou.

Lie and Danny face Chiyou together while the others are sent through the Randall Gate back to New York. Despite being weakened in a human body, Chiyou nearly overwhelms the two Fists until Danny restrains Chiyou long enough for Lie to deal a devastating blow to Chiyou, which sends Danny back to the underworld but succeeds in weakening Chiyou, allowing Feng to regain control over his body. However, Feng is stabbed from behind by Loki with the Sword of Chiyou, which he seals Chiyou in, and teleports away with Feng. Lie succumbs to his wounds and as he dies, he transfers the Iron Fist back to Shou-Lao's egg, which causes a fully grown Shou-Lao to hatch and revive Lie. Shou-Lao offers Lie a choice of continue being the Iron Fist or returning to a normal life, but informs Lie that his lifespan has been greatly reduced from overusing his chi. Realizing that his life will never go back to normal, Lie chooses to be the Iron Fist again and resolves to dedicate his remaining time to continue helping and fighting for others as Danny did. Lie and Shou-Lao reunite with their friends in New York as Danny creates a new Book of the Iron Fist and continues his service to Osiris.

Elsewhere, Loki heals Feng but leaves him as a prisoner for future use as he departs to keep the Sword of Chiyou safe in Asgard. However, Feng discovers that Loki had imbued him with a sliver of Chiyou's power, and declares himself as the Immortal War Fist.

== Publication history ==
In November 2025, Marvel Comics announced a five-issue comic book limited series titled Deadly Hands of K'un-Lun, with Yifan Jiang as writer and Paco Medina as artist. The series serves as a follow-up to the 2025 limited series The Undead Iron Fist. Jiang described the series as a "mini event" that serves as the climax to the conflict between the Iron Fist Lin Lie and his arch-enemy and older brother, Lin Feng. Jiang also called the series an "ensemble, not unlike" the video game Marvel Rivals (2024); he had previously worked as a writer on that game. Deadly Hands of K'un-Lun began publication on February 18, 2026, and ended on June 17 of the same year.

=== Issues ===
Issue	Title	Publication date	Ref.
#1	"War Song"	February 18, 2026	
#2	"The Breach"	March 25, 2026	
#3	"Rising Dragon, Leaping Tiger"	April 29, 2026	
#4	"Instant Karma"	May 20, 2026	
#5	"The Crossroad"	June 17, 2026	

== Reception ==
According to ComicbookRoundup, the series received an average rating of 8.1 out of 10 based on 8 reviews.
