= Thunderer (comics) =

In comics, Thunderer may refer to:

- Thunderer (DC Comics), a DC Comics character
- Several Marvel Comics characters:
  - Thunderer, a Marvel Comics character
  - Lei Kung, an Iron Fist supporting character also known as Lei Kung the Thunderer
  - Sparrow, another Iron Fist character also called the Thunderer
  - Danny Rand, who briefly succeeds Sparrow as the Thunderer

== See also ==
- Thunderer (disambiguation)
