= Lin Lie =

Marvel Comics superhero

- Lin Lie as Iron Fist on the cover of Iron Fist vol. 6 #1 (February 2022). Art by Jim Cheung

Publication information
- Publisher: Marvel Comics
- First appearance: As Sword Master: Warriors of Three Sovereigns #1 (May 2018); As Iron Fist: Iron Fist vol. 6 #1 (February 2022)
- Created by: Shuizhu; Gunji

In-story information
- Full name: Lin Lie
- Species: Human
- Team affiliations: Agents of Atlas
- Partnerships: Shang-Chi; White Fox; Danny Rand
- Notable aliases: Sword Master; Iron Fist
- Abilities: Utilizing concentrated chi in his body called the "Iron Fist", a mystical weapon; Expert martial artist and swordsman; Expert puzzle solver; Formerly: Wielded the Sword of Fu Xi which granted: Ability to project mystical green flame; Limited flight; Exorcism

Lin Lie
- Chinese: 林烈
Transcriptions
Standard Mandarin
- Hanyu Pinyin: Lín Liè
- Bopomofo: ㄌㄧㄣˊ ㄌㄧㄝˋ
- Wade–Giles: Lin^{2} Lieh^{4}
- IPA: [lǐn ljê]
Yue: Cantonese
- Yale Romanization: Làhm Liht
- Jyutping: lam4 lit6
- IPA: [lɐm˩ lit̚˨]

Iron Fist
- Traditional Chinese: 鐵拳
- Simplified Chinese: 铁拳
Transcriptions
Standard Mandarin
- Hanyu Pinyin: Tiěquán
- Bopomofo: ㄊㄧㄝˇ ㄑㄩㄢˊ
- Wade–Giles: T‘ieh^{3}-ch‘üen^{2}
- IPA: [tʰjè.tɕʰɥɛ̌n]
Yue: Cantonese
- Yale Romanization: Titkyùhn
- Jyutping: tit3 kyun4
- IPA: [tʰit̚˧.kʰyn˩]

Sword Master
- Traditional Chinese: 劍仙
- Simplified Chinese: 剑仙
Transcriptions
Standard Mandarin
- Hanyu Pinyin: Jiànxiān
- Bopomofo: ㄐㄧㄢˋ ㄒㄧㄢ
- Wade–Giles: Chien^{4}-hsien^{1}
- IPA: [tɕjɛ̂n.ɕjɛ́n]
Yue: Cantonese
- Yale Romanization: Gimsīn
- Jyutping: gim3 sin1
- IPA: [kim˧.sin˩]

Lin Lie (Chinese: 林烈) is a superhero who appears in media produced by American comic book publisher Marvel Comics. Created in partnership with the Chinese media company NetEase, the character first appeared in the 2018 Chinese digital manhua Warrior of the Three Sovereigns #1, written by Shuizhu and illustrated by Gunji.

A descendant of the mythological Chinese figure Fu Xi, Lin was initially established with the alias Sword Master, and wielded the mystical Sword of Fu Xi. He later joins the superhero team the Agents of Atlas, making his English-language debut in the 2019 comic War of the Realms: New Agents of Atlas #2. After the Sword of Fu Xi is destroyed, he becomes the new Iron Fist, debuting as the character in Iron Fist vol. 6 #1 (February 2022).

== Publication history ==
In 2017, Marvel partnered with the Chinese media company NetEase as part of an initiative to expand its audience in China and East Asia. This partnership resulted in the creation of the superheroes Lin Lie and Aero, both of whom debuted in May 2018 in Chinese-language digital manhua published on 163.com.

Sword Master made his American comics debut in War of the Realms: New Agents of Atlas by writer Greg Pak and artist Gang Hyuk Lim before starring in his own solo series, titled Sword Master, written by Pak and illustrated by Ario Anindito. The Sword Master series also featured republications of the Warriors of Three Sovereigns series Lin debuted in, with translations done by Pak. Sword Master would continue to have regular appearances in Agents of Atlas.

In 2022, Lin Lie made his debut as Iron Fist in a five-issue miniseries written by Alyssa Wong and illustrated by Michael YG and Sean Chen; his Iron Fist costume was designed by Jim Cheung. While promoting the series, Wong acknowledged the controversy surrounding Iron Fist's race and stated that making the new Iron Fist Asian was an important step for diversity. Wong nevertheless stressed that the series would build upon Danny Rand's history and legacy instead of replacing it. The miniseries was followed up with the one-shot A.X.E.: Iron Fist #1 as part of the A.X.E.: Judgment Day crossover event.

In May 2023, to celebrate Asian American and Pacific Islander Heritage Month, Lin starred in a backup story in Daredevil Vol. 7 #11, written by Jason Loo and drawn by Lynne Yoshii, with an AAPI Heritage Month Variant Cover featuring Iron Fist drawn by artist InHyuk Lee.

In August 2024, Lin was featured in a one-shot commemorating the 50th anniversary of Iron Fist, with Wong returning as writer and Von Randal illustrating.

In February 2026, Lin starred in Deadly Hands of K'un-Lun, a five-issue limited series written by Yifan Jiang and illustrated by Paco Medina.

== Fictional character biography ==
=== Warriors of Three Sovereigns ===
Lin Lie is a college student from Shanghai who receives a mysterious sword from his archaeologist father, who went missing along with Lie's older brother Lin Feng shortly afterwards. One year after his family's disappearance, Lie is attacked by a demon at his apartment after receiving a mysterious red orb contained in a puzzle box. The sword Lie's father entrusted to him moves on its own to save Lie from the demon, which is then destroyed by Ji Shuangshuang, a demon hunter. Shuangshuang reveals that the sword is the Sword of Fu Xi, one of three sacred weapons used by the Yellow Emperor and the clans of the Three Sovereigns to seal the evil god Chiyou in the far past. Shuangshuang explains that she and Lie are the descendants of Nü-wa and Fu Xi, respectively, and that the Sword and the red orb containing a piece of Chiyou's soul were removed from one of Chiyou's three tombs, weakening his seal and allowing several of his demon minions to be unleashed around the world. Believing Lie to be too incompetent to protect the orb, Shuangshuang takes it with her. Lie gives chase but is attacked by Baron Mordo, who attempts to take the Sword for himself, but is driven away by Doctor Strange. Strange offers to keep the Sword for safekeeping but relents after Lie explains his lineage and needing the Sword to find his missing father, using his magic to help Lie reunite with Shuangshuang. Together, Lie and Shuangshuang destroy the remaining demons. Lie travels with Shuangshuang and his roommate Ah Cheng to the Nü-wa Clan's headquarters at Gansu, where he is greeted by Shuangshuang's grandmother and the Nü-wa chief Ji Xiangyun. As Lie, his father and brother are the only known descendants of Fu Xi, Xiangyun has Lie trained under Shuangshuang to prepare against Chiyou and his demon army.

=== Agents of Atlas ===
Now going by the name Sword Master, Lie begins a superhero career while fighting the forces of Chiyou and searching for his missing family. During the "War of the Realms", Amadeus Cho summons Sword Master and several other Asian superheroes to Seoul to help the New Agents of Atlas defend Asia from Queen Sindr and her Fire Goblin forces from Muspelheim. Sword Master and the New Agents of Atlas take Sindr and her army in Northern China and later help Captain Marvel defeat her and her remaining forces at the Great Wall of China near Beijing. After Sindr's liege Malekith is defeated, Sword Master joins the Agents of Atlas.

Sword Master runs into his Atlas teammate Shang-Chi in New York City while searching for his father. Noticing the upstart hero's inexperience and recklessness, Shang takes Lie under his wing to improve his skills. The two are reunited with the other Atlas agents when Flushing and other Asian, Pacific and predominantly Asian cities outside of Asia are merged into the portal city of "Pan" Tech by mogul Mike Nguyen of the Big Nguyen Company. Sword Master and Shang-Chi are later confronted by Ares, who attempts to take the Sword of Fu Xi to rescue his kidnaped drakon son Ismenios, who Ares believes was captured by another god. Shang-Chi makes a compromise to Ares: in exchange for Sword Master and Shang-Chi helping him, Ares would help find Lie's missing father. Ares accepts and use Pan Portals to track Ismenios to a temple in Madripoor, where they encounter Davi Naka, the Mother Goddess of Madripoor. Naka reveals that Ismenios attempted to plunder Atlantis's treasure hoard during the absence of its sea serpent guardian, but was caught by Namor. Due to her duty to protect all dragons, Naka rescued Ismenios from Namor's wrath and imprisoned the young drakon in her temple for his protection and to placate the king. Naka further warns the four that despite her efforts, Namor is still outraged over the disappearance of his dragon and implores them to find her.

Sword Master and the Atlas Agents help assist Pan's citizens, including defending the city from invading wyverns and sea serpents and protecting Madripoorean refuges from harassment from the Pan Guard. Suspicious by these events, Sword Master joins several of his teammates into infiltrating Nguyen's personal tower, where they discover that the Big Nguyen Company had captured Atlantis' missing dragon and were harvesting her scales to power Pan's portals. Before a decision could be made about releasing the dragon, Namor emerges from the waters off of Pan's coast to reclaim his stolen dragon, kickstarting a war between Pan and Atlantis.

In the "Atlantis Attacks" storyline, Sword Master and the other New Agents of Atlas are summoned by Amadeus Cho during his confrontation with Namor. Namor warns the group to return Atlantis' dragon in a day or else face the wrath of Atlantis before retreating. After the skirmish, Sword Master and the other New Agents are introduced to the original Agents of Atlas by Atlas Foundation head Jimmy Woo. When Woo sends Namora, Venus, Aero and Wave to Atlantis for a diplomatic mission, Amadeus discretely orders Sword Master and Shang-Chi to spy on Namora, due to her familial ties with Namor. The dragon is eventually released from captivity, but upon arriving home, she unexpectedly goes berserk and attacks the underwater kingdom. Sword Master witnesses the destruction caused by the dragon and Shang-Chi relays to Amadeus that Atlantis' scientists discovered an implant embedded in the dragon's scales to be the source of her behavior and that Namor believes Amadeus to be behind the sabotage, prompting the king to resume his assault on Pan. When Amadeus is forcibly transformed into his Hulk form and put under Nguyen's control with Sirena tech in a last-ditch effort to destroy Atlantis, Sword Master and Shang-Chi are able to remove the device from Amadeus, freeing him from Nguyen's control. When the conflict between Pan and Atlantis is peacefully resolved, Amadeus and Shang-Chi leave the team after admonishing Woo for using the team as his pawns, but Sword Master remains with the Agents of Atlas.

During the "King in Black" event, Sword Master initially defends Shanghai from invading symbiote dragons with Aero and the Black Knight, who had been abandoned in Shanghai and separated from his Ebony Blade, but abandons his mission after realizing that the symbiotes were minions of Knull rather than Chiyou, believing the task to be beneath him. Angered by Lie's arrogance, the Sword of Fu Xi abandons him for Black Knight, which incenses Sword Master as he dismisses Black Knight as a "psychotic American" unworthy of wielding the Sword. While using the Sword of Fu Xi, Black Knight succumbs to madness, which prompts the Sword to return to Lie. As Sword Master and Black Knight fight over the Sword, a symbiote dragon ensnares them with its tendrils, which also mentally connects them to Knull, who expresses his desire for their respective swords and ruthlessly mocks the two for their ignorance of their weapons' true histories. The Sword of Fu Xi burns Black Knight's hand, returns to Sword Master, and frees the two from Knull's grasp just as a swarm of symbiote dragons amalgamates into Knull's avatar, taking on a gigantic appearance of Chiyou. Sword Master helps Black Knight recover the Ebony Blade and two use their respective swords to destroy the avatar with Aero's help.

When the death of Doctor Strange prompts legions of demons to invade parts of the world, Sword Master is sent to Seoul by Woo to assist his teammate White Fox with taking down an undead kumiho that had been terrorizing the South Korean countryside. While fighting the kumiho, the Sword of Fu Xi is destroyed by the kumiho who then throws Sword Master into a ravine. Although White Fox is able to slay the demon, she, the Agents of Atlas and Tiger Division are unable to find Lie, with White Fox recovering only a single shard of the Sword, causing them to presume he died. Due to the Sword of Fu Xi's destruction, the seals on Chiyou's three tombs further weakened, prompting more of his demon minions to attack cities around the world.

=== Wielding the Iron Fist ===
Lin Lie miraculously survives and washes ashore to K'un-L'un, where the recently reincarnated dragon Shou-Lao bestows him with his chi, saving Lie's life and making him the new Iron Fist. With several of the Sword's shards embedded in his hands, Lie resolves to find the remaining pieces and reforge the Sword to prevent Chiyou's release. During his hunt for the shards, Lin Lie briefly encounters his predecessor Danny Rand, who had previously given up the Iron Fist, in Flushing and helps him fight off several minions of Chiyou. Unaware of Lie's identity but happy that Shou-Lao chose a new champion, Danny inquires Lie about his background and offers to help him with his training, but Lie rebuffs and summons a portal back to K'un-Lun. Lie is later accompanied by Mei Min, a friend he made in K'un-Lun whose family hosts him, during his travels and helps him recover the remaining shards while fighting the demonic forces of Chiyou. Despite being chosen as the new Iron Fist, Lie's ascension is controversial amongst several K'un-Lun citizens as he is not only the third consecutive outsider to become the Iron Fist, he did not go through the required trials to earn Shou-Lao's chi. Due to the shards of the Sword of Fu Xi embedded in his hands, Lie cannot summon the Iron Fist consistently and suffers from chronic pain, which makes him a target of ridicule and scorn by several detractors, including his rival Yang Yi. Reeling from imposter syndrome, Lie expresses to Min about how unworthy he is as Iron Fist due to his handicap and unwanted status, and the Yu-Ti Sparrow takes Lie under her wing to help him overcome his struggles and regain his confidence. One day during his training, the shards in Lie's hands suddenly begin radiating with burning energy and leaving him writhing in pain, causing Lie to realize that the first tomb of Chiyou had been destroyed. An empowered demon minion of Chiyou manages to bypass K'un-Lun's defenses attempts to steal the Sword's remains at Min's home, but Lie impales his arms with them to thwart the demon and uses their extra power to kill him, who reveals with his dying breaths that Lie's brother Feng was the one who destroyed the tomb and that he was waiting for him at the second one. Lie takes a portal to the second tomb with Min and Yi but after arriving they encounter Fat Cobra and the Bride of Nine Spiders. Tasked by Rand to track Lie down, the two Immortal Weapons decide to test the new Iron Fist out by fighting him. Severely outmatched and running out of time, Lie flees from the fight to the Nü-wa Clan's headquarters, but is too late to prevent its destruction from Feng and Chiyou's minions. Unable to summon the Iron Fist, Lie is quickly defeated by Feng. Lie rejects Feng's offer to join him, who proceeds to immerse himself with Chiyou's magic to destroy Lie and his allies. Guided by Shou-Lao's spirit, Lie embraces his identities as Sword Master and Iron Fist, allowing him to summon the full power of the Iron Fist and the partially restored blade of the Sword of Fu Xi, which Lie uses to wound Feng. When Sparrow arrives with K'un-Lun's warriors as reinforcements, Feng steals her portal to K'un-Lun, where Chiyou's third tomb is located. After the battle, Lie accepts Danny's offer to train him.

During the "Judgement Day" storyline, Lie takes a flight to Seoul to rendezvous with White Fox but is confronted midflight by Feng's ally Loki. Provoked by Loki's arrogance, the Progenitor casts judgement on the two by having them partake in trials within their minds. During Loki's judgement, Lie rescues him from being pinned down by a vision of Mjolnir by lifting it, proving his worthiness. During Lie's judgement, the Progenitor appears as Shou-Lao and challenges Lie to take his heart to officially earn his title as Iron Fist. Lie is able to defeat Shou-Lao with Loki's help but instead of taking the dragon's heart, Lie asks Shou-Lao to give it to him. Lie receives the mark of the Iron Fist on his right arm and passes the Progenitor's judgement. Lie and Loki find themselves back on the flight as if nothing happened but the mark still remains on Lie's arm. Before Lie could demand Loki to take him to Feng, Loki teleports away from him. Lie eventually arrives in Seoul and reunites with White Fox.

Following Danny's advice, Lie seeks out Daredevil in Hell's Kitchen to teach him how to fight while mitigating the chronic pain in his arms.

On the night of Danny's 34th birthday, Lie is attacked by the Shocker while out on patrol in New York and teams up with Danny's ward and intended successor Pei to defeat the supervillain. Unbeknownst to both, the Shocker was hired by the Ch'i-Lin to keep Lie and Pei preoccupied while it possessed Razor Fist into attacking Danny at his apartment. With Lie unable to help him, Danny is killed by the Ch'i-Lin. Lie later attends Danny's funeral.

Lie is one of many heroes forcibly summoned across the Multiverse to the alternate future of 2099 by Abyssus (the Knull-possessed Galactus of 2099) to battle against the heroes of 2099 summoned by the Mephisto of 2099. Like the other Abyssal Warriors, Lie is infected with a Knull Seed by Abyssus, inducing him with bloodlust while enthralling him to Abyssus. In the battle's climax, the Knull Seeds activate, turning Lie and others into hosts for Abyssus' symbiotes. Although Lie and the Abyssal Warriors are cured of their seeds by the Spider-Men of 2099 and 3099, the Abyssal Warriors continue fighting the forces of 2099 as Abyssus is holding their home universes hostage. Lie and the Abyssal Warriors are freed when the Ultimate Nullifier is used by Galactus to erase Knull from existence at the cost of his own life, and Mephisto returns the Abyssal Warriors to their home universes with no knowledge of the event.

=== Deadly Hands of K'un-Lun ===
Lie and White Fox have since begun dating, but Lie struggles with his deteriorating relationship with Pei, his lingering guilt over Danny's death, and his inability to reconnect with Shou-Lao. To take his mind off things, Lie investigates an anomaly detected in Hells Kitchen, where he encounters Neon Dragon, who is working for Feng and reveals that Feng and his forces have destroyed the other Heavenly Cities and killed the Immortal Weapons during Lie's exile from K'un-Lun before teleporting away. Immediately afterwards, Feng opens a portal from K'un-Lun, causing the shards in Lie's arms to overwhelm him with severe pain, and sends his army led by the Steel Serpent to invade the city. Struggling through the pain, Lie discovers that Steel Serpent and the War Fists all possess the power of the Iron Fist, but he is able to fend them off with Daredevil, White Tiger and Fooh. However, Steel Serpent and his forces were targeting a building housing a portal to Attilan, but they are stopped by Karnak and Aero. After forming a plan with Karnak, Lie decides to take the fight to Feng and leads Aero, Daredevil and White Tiger through Feng's portal. Inside, they are confronted by Feng but Lie stays behind to fight him alone. Feng uses his sorcery to extract the shards of the Sword of Fu Xi from Lie's arms, which he then forges into the Sword of Chiyou and severs Lie's right arm. Lie is then saved by White Fox and Pei, and the subsequent arrival of Danny, now the Ghost Fist of Osiris, quickly turns the tide of the battle and reestablishes Lie's connection with Shou-Lao; the portal is destroyed and the War Fists are freed from their thrall. Feng then reveals he had the third orb, which Chiyou then uses to revive himself through Feng's body. Needing more chi to both open the Randall Gate in New York and to stop Chiyou, Lie has all the War Fists provide him with Shou-Lao's siphoned chi, turning him into a demigod and restoring his right arm, before facing off against Chiyou. With Danny's help, Lie defeats Chiyou and frees Feng from his control, but Feng is captured and taken away by Loki. Lie nearly succumbs to his wounds and transfers the Iron Fist back to Shou-Lao's egg as he dies, but Shou-Lao hatches and revives him once again. Shou-Lao offers Lie a choice of being the Iron Fist again or returning to a normal life and warns Lie that his lifespan has been greatly reduced from wielding so much chi. Realizing he would never have a normal life again, Lie re-accepts the Iron Fist and resolves to spend his remaining days fighting for others.

== Powers and abilities ==
As the descendant of Fu Xi, Lin Lie can wield the Sword of Fu Xi and access its divine powers. When activated, the Sword generates mystical green flames, which can be launched as projectiles or be used to increase the cutting power and range of the blade. Due to its ability to move on its own, the Sword is capable of allowing Lin to fly at short distances. Although originally forged to destroy Chiyou and his demon minions, the Sword of Fu Xi is shown to be just as effective against other demons and undead.

A noticeable trait is that the Sword of Fu Xi is sentient, and has the ability to move on its own. While the Sword has gone out of its way to protect Lin from threats, it has also defied him when he showed undesirable traits, such as cowardice or arrogance. In some extreme cases, the Sword has allowed itself to be wielded by non descendants of Fu Xi.

Despite the Sword being shattered, its broken shards could still project its mystical green flames, which are still effective against Chiyou's minions. Lin made use of the shards embedded in his hands to enhance his punches and infuse weapons with the Sword's flames. Lin later gained the ability to summon the Sword's restored blade from his right fist. Lin retained this ability until the shards were forcibly extracted by Lin Feng.

After being bestowed with the chi of the dragon Shou-Lao, Lin gained the power of the Iron Fist, allowing him to summon and focus his chi to enhance his natural abilities to extraordinary levels. Like every Iron Fist before him, Lin can concentrate his own chi and the superhuman energy from Shou-Lao's heart into his hands, which manifests into a supernatural glow around his hands and fists that can strike with superhuman hardness and impact, while keeping them impervious to pain and injury. Lin can focus his chi inward to heal himself from injury and pain. When absorbing a large quantity of chi, Lie is transformed into a demigod which greatly increases his physical attributes but at the cost of quickly burning away his lifespan. In addition to enhanced strength and durability in his demigod form, Lie can regenerate missing limbs and organs and manifest solid weapons from his chi.

While the broken shards of the Sword of Fu Xi were embedded in the flesh of his hands, Lin Lie suffered from chronic pain. When Lin first struggled with channeling the Iron Fist consistently, he originally believed that the shards' presence in his body was disrupting the flow of chi; Lie was warned that failing to properly balance his own chi with Shou-Lao's or immediately removing the shards would result in his death. However, after Shao-Lou revealed that Lie's issues came from his own self-doubt rather than his injuries, Lie embraced his dual identities, allowing him to summon the powers of Shou-Lao and the Sword of Fu Xi simultaneously without any ill effects. However, the chronic pain remained in his arms, which he learned how to mitigate after training with Daredevil. This handicap remained with Lie until the shards were removed by Feng.

Due to his training under the Nü-wa Clan, Agents of Atlas and the monks of K'un-L'un, Lin Lie is an expert swordsman, martial artist and acrobat. In addition to K'un-Lun's martial arts, Lin is proficient in Bajiquan and Wing Chun.

Lin Lie is also exceptionally good at solving puzzles.

== Reception ==
Upon Lin Lie's debut as Sword Master, Jules Chin Green of Screen Rant described him as "a fumbling, highly relatable hero".

In his review of the 2022 Iron Fist miniseries, Justin Carter of io9 praised Lin Lie's evolution from Sword Master to Iron Fist, calling it a much-needed modern update to the character. While noting that Lie, like his predecessor Danny Rand, is also an outsider who takes on the Iron Fist mantle, Carter emphasized that Lie "[feels] like a natural extension of the Iron Fist legacy instead of a younger carbon copy of the established hero." He further highlighted that Lie "breaks the mold of recent teen heroes like Miles [Morales], Robbie Reyes, and Kamala Khan" by beginning as an original character before assuming a legacy role. Carter also commended the character's raw vulnerability and chronic pain, which he felt made Lie both compelling and sympathetic—distinct qualities that set him apart from Rand. Although Colin Moon of AIPT was critical of Lie being "announced to be Iron Fist than organically taking on the mantle", he praised Lie for maintaining "his own unique concerns—the essential parts of his superheroic presence" which ensured his past as Sword Master wasn't overshadowed by his future as Iron Fist.

In an analysis of Asian representation in Marvel Rivals, George Yang of Polygon described Lin Lie as a fresh take on Iron Fist, arguing that passing the mantle to an established Chinese superhero addressed longstanding criticism of Danny Rand's origins while improving Asian representation.

== Collected editions ==
| Title | Material collected | Published date | ISBN |
|---|---|---|---|
| Sword Master Vol. 1: War of the Ancients | Sword Master #1-6 | February 2020 | 978-1302919481 |
| Sword Master Vol. 2: God of War | Sword Master #7-12 | February 2021 | 978-1302919498 |
| Iron Fist: The Shattered Sword | Iron Fist (vol. 6) #1-5 | November 2022 | 978-0785194767 |

== In other media ==
- Lin Lie as Sword Master appears as an unlockable playable character in Marvel Future Fight.
- Lin Lie as both Sword Master and Iron Fist appears in Marvel Snap.
- Lin Lie as Iron Fist appears as a playable character in Marvel Rivals, voiced by Stephen Fu. Additionally, Lie as Sword Master appears as an unlockable alternate skin.
