= Yu-Ti =

Dragon Lord
- Nu-An as the Yu-Ti as depicted in New Avengers (vol. 2) #25 (June 2012). Art by Mike Deodato and Will Conrad.

Publication information
- Publisher: Marvel Comics
- First appearance: Nu-An: Marvel Premiere #15 (May 1974); Tuan: Deadly Hands of Kung Fu #21 (February 1976); Lei Kung: Marvel Premiere #16 (June 1974); Lei Kung (as Yu-Ti): Immortal Iron Fist #14 (April 2008); Sparrow: Iron Fist: The Living Weapon #2 (May 2014)
- Created by: Nu-An; Roy Thomas; Gil Kane; Tuan; Chris Claremont; Rudy Nebres; Lei-Kung; Roy Thomas; Len Wein; Larry Hama; Ed Brubaker; Matt Fraction; Kano; Sparrow; Kaare Andrews

In-story information
- Alter ego: Nu-An; Tuan; Lei Kung; Sparrow
- Notable aliases: Dragon Lord; Thunderer
- Abilities: All: Hand-to-hand combat Nu-An, Tuan and Lei-Kung: Longevity

Yu-Ti is the name of several characters appearing in American comic books published by Marvel Comics. The Yu-Ti is the leader of the mythical city K'un-Lun and is a supporting character of Iron Fist.

== Publication history ==
The Yu-Ti first appeared in Marvel Premiere #15 (May 1974), and was created by Roy Thomas and Gil Kane. The character subsequently appears in Deadly Hands of Kung Fu #10 (March 1975), Marvel Premiere #22 (June 1975), Master of Kung Fu Annual #1 (1976), Deadly Hands of Kung Fu #21 (February 1976), Iron Fist #6-7 (August–September 1976), Marvel Team-Up #64 (December 1977), Power Man and Iron Fist #74-75 (October–November 1981), and Immortal Iron Fist #4-8 (May–October 2007), and #10-14 (December 2007-June 2008).

== Fictional character biography ==
=== Tuan ===
The Yu-Ti Lord Tuan dwelt with his son Nu-An in the shining tower in the realm of K'un-L'un with which they can observe the peace in their realm and watch other dimensions using the emerald known as the Great Crystal. Lord Tuan and Nu-An went wandering outside the city and encountered Shou-Lao who tried to attack them. A man from Earth named Wendell Rand suddenly arrived on K'un-L'un and drove Shou-Lao away with a rifle.

Tuan adopted Wendell Rand as his son and took him into his house. Nu-An was present as the new Yu-Ti where he puts his arms around Wendell Rand showing him preference over Davos.

Nu-An helped Wendell into preparing his uniform as he was got ready to fight Davos and earn the right to make a challenge to Shou-Lao. Nu-An watched silently as Davos accused Lord Tuan of favoritism when he declared Wendell the winner. Nu-An also stood silently as Tuan exiled Davos from K'un-L'un because he challenged Shou-Lao without his permission.

Lord Tuan dies and becomes the first of the Yama Kings of Feng-Tu, with his son Nu-An becoming the new Yu-Ti.

=== Nu-An ===
Wendell and Shakirah fell in love and got married, having a daughter named Miranda Rand. This ended up earning Wendell the enmity of Nu-An who was also in love with Shakirah.

Nu-An mentors Wendell Rand's son Danny Rand, also known as Iron Fist.

Nu-An summons Iron Fist to participate in the Tournament of Heaven which will decide the order in which each of the Seven Cities of Heaven will appear on Earth. During the tournament, it is discovered that Nu-An and the leaders of the Seven Cities had secretly erected gateways between Earth and each city without the knowledge of the populace. The corruption of the leaders of the Seven Cities of Heaven spurns Lei Kung the Thunderer, Iron Fist and the other Immortal Weapons into staging a revolution against Nu-An and the other leaders. After Nu-An flees K'un-Lun, Lei Kung succeeds him as Yu-Ti.

After Nu-An's ousting, much of his corruption is revealed to the public, including his illegal imprisonment of political prisoners in the Eighth City.

=== Lei Kung ===
Lei Kung rules as Yu-Ti until he is killed by the crazed android known as the One.

=== Sparrow ===
The adopted daughter of Lei Kung and childhood friend of Danny, Sparrow was chosen to succeed Lei Kung as the new Thunderer. Sparrow lost her eyes when the One and Davos attacked K'un-Lun but her blindless left her undeterred and she helped nurse the injured Danny back to health after he failed to stop the One. After the One and Davos were defeated in New York City, Sparrow returns to rebuild K'un-Lun as its new Yu-Ti while Danny fulfills the dual role of Iron Fist and Thunderer for the young K'un-Luan monk Pei, who also received a part of the Iron Fist.

When Lin Lie washes ashore to K'un-Lun and is chosen by Shou-Lao as the new Iron Fist, Sparrow takes him under her wing to help boost his confidence when he feels unworthy of his new title and powers. Sparrow answers Danny's call for reinforcements against Lie's brother Lin Feng but when she and her warriors arrive in Gansu, Feng hijacks her portal to K'un-Lun, leaving her and the other K'un-Luan citizens trapped on Earth although Danny offers housing and resources to them.

Sparrow and her resistance army return to K'un-Lun to overthrow Feng, but ultimately fail and are put under Chiyou's thrall. Sparrow and the others are later freed by Lin Lie and his allies and ultimately free K'un-Lun from Feng and Chiyou.

== Powers and abilities ==
All of the Yu-Ti's have been shown to be masters of hand-to-hand combat. Nu-an, Tuan and Lei-Kung are immune to aging due to eating fruit from the Tree of Immortality.

== In other media ==
Yü-Ti appears in the second season of Iron Fist, portrayed by James Saito.
