= Steel Serpent =

- Cover art for The Immortal Iron Fist #4. Art by David Aja.

Publication information
- Publisher: Marvel Comics
- First appearance: Unnamed: The Deadly Hands of Kung Fu #10 (March 1975); Davos: Iron Fist #1 (November 1975)
- Created by: Unnamed: Jenny Blake Isabella; Frank McLaughlin; Davos: Chris Claremont; John Byrne

In-story information
- Alter ego: Davos
- Species: Human
- Team affiliations: Hydra; Immortal Weapons
- Notable aliases: Iron Fist; Steel Phoenix
- Abilities: Master martial artist; Longevity; Chi absorption and manipulation

Steel Serpent (Davos) is a supervillain appearing in American comic books published by Marvel Comics. The character is usually depicted as an enemy of Iron Fist.

Sacha Dhawan portrays Davos in the Marvel Cinematic Universe television series Iron Fist.

== Publication history ==
The first, otherwise unnamed, Steel Serpent appeared in The Deadly Hands of Kung Fu #10 (1974), his only appearance, and was created by Jenny Blake Isabella and Frank McLaughlin.

The second Steel Serpent, Davos, debuted in Iron Fist #1 (1975) and was created by Chris Claremont and John Byrne.

== Fictional character biography ==
Davos is a native of K'un-Lun and the son of Lei Kung. A gifted student of his father, Davos was one of two candidates who earned the right to challenge for the power of the Iron Fist. However, he was defeated by Wendell Rand, the adopted son of K'un-Lun's ruler Lord Tuan. Davos accused Tuan of unfairly favoring his son and left the city without permission to confront the dragon Shou-Lao. Failing to defeat the dragon, he returned to K'un-Lun in disgrace and was exiled to Earth. Twenty years later, Wendell's son Daniel succeeds in winning the Iron Fist power and soon afterwards returns to Earth. Davos tracks Iron Fist to New York and steals his power. Since he had not earned it fairly, the Iron Fist's power consumes Davos's body and returns to Danny.

Davos's spirit travels to a realm accessible from the Anomaly Gem. After reassembling the fragments of the gem, he manages to restore his body. Davos successfully takes Iron Fist's power, then returns to K'un-Lun and overthrows Yu-Ti. With Lei Kung's help, Danny defeats Davos without his powers, thereby proving himself worthy of it once again. Davos escapes, but is left crippled for misusing Iron Fist's power. Davos is later defeated by Junzo Muto, who kills him by absorbing the remnants of the Iron Fist from his body.

=== The Immortal Iron Fist ===
Davos is resurrected and granted power by the Crane Mother, promising to locate and destroy the renegade Iron Fist Orson Randall in return. His power is further enhanced after he consumes the life forces of the Crane Mother's daughters. Now known as the Steel Phoenix, Davos takes part in the Tournament of the Seven Heavenly Cities. Early in the tournament, he battles Tiger's Beautiful Daughter, who cuts off his left hand. Enraged, Davos forms a new hand using chi.

Davos takes part in the rebellion of K'un-Lun after his father forces him to recognize the potential treachery of his allies by asking him to consider the possibility that there might another angle that he had not anticipated rather than constantly assuming that he was always right. He helps overthrow the Yu-Ti Nu-An and begins a process of redeeming himself in the eyes of his peers. His father Lei Kung, who has taken over leadership of K'un-Lun, charges him with guarding a dragon egg, from which Shou-Lao shall be reborn.

=== Iron Fist: The Living Weapon ===
Davos' redemption does not last. He forms an alliance with the One, an android who had absorbed the memories of Wendell Rand, to take over K'un-Lun. The two lead their army of cybernetic ninjas to sack K'un-Lun. While the One kills Lei-Kung, Davos attempts to take Shou-Lao's egg, blinding his adopted sister Sparrow in the process, but a young monk named Pei flees with the egg to New York City to search for Rand.

Davos and his soldiers track Pei down and captures her and the hatchling, Gork. He then meets with the One at the Rand Building to turn New York into New K'un-Lun. Iron Fist and Sparrow confront Davos at the Rand Building, with Sparrow staying behind to fight her brother while Iron Fist takes on the One. Using the siphoned chi of K'un-Lun's citizens, the One attempts to open a portal to the afterlife to summon Wendell's deceased wife Heather, but instead summons the Xian fire god Zhu Rong, who attacks the city for the One's actions in upsetting the universal order.

Davos attempt to flee back to K'un-Lun, but is stopped by Sparrow and the other freed citizens. In the ensuing fight, Davos kills Gork to gain the Iron Fist for himself. Instead, Pei receives the power and swiftly defeats Davos while Iron Fist absorbs the One's chi to vanquish Zhu Rong. Davos' Iron Fist powers are restored by Lin Feng, who he joins in his campaign to revive Chiyou.

== Powers and abilities ==
The Steel Serpent is a master of the martial arts of K'un-Lun, including those practiced millennia ago. His skills rival those of Iron Fist, and he has defeated him several times in combat, though usually with the element of surprise on his side. He is very strong, fast, agile, and tough with lightning quick reflexes and reactions. He has proved capable of draining the power of the Iron Fist (the energies of Shou-Lao) from its wielder by pressing his serpentine tattoo against the wielder's dragon tattoo. Upon entering the service of Lin Feng, Davos was granted the power of the Iron Fist again through Feng's dark magic.

Davos has used his chi-absorbing abilities to absorb the life-force of other beings, including their flesh blood, allowing him to heal his body from near fatal wounds.

Davos was granted the power of the Crane Mother, giving him similar chi-augmenting abilities as the Iron Fist. As the Steel Phoenix, Davos has been able to perform the Steel Phoenix Blow, which he used to create a replacement hand from chi after his hand was severed. After the Crane Mother cut him off from her power, Davos was gifted a cybernetic arm by the One.

Davos once wielded taloned gloves that were equipped with miniature flamethrowers, which he called the Serpent's Sting.

== In other media ==
- Davos / Steel Serpent appears in Iron Fist, portrayed by Sacha Dhawan, while his younger self is portrayed by Shiv Pai.
- Steel Serpent appears as a playable character in Lego Marvel Super Heroes 2, voiced by Sacha Dhawan.
