= David Aja =

Spanish comic book artist (born 1977)

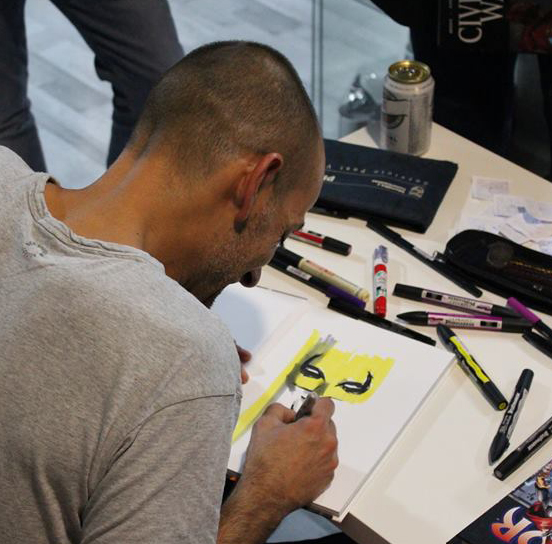
- Aja in 2016
- Born: April 16, 1977 (age 49) Valladolid, Spain
- Area: Artist
- Notable works: The Immortal Iron Fist, Hawkeye
- Awards: "Favourite Newcomer Artist" Eagle Award (2008) "Best Penciller/Inker" and "Best Cover Artist" Eisner Award (2013)

David Aja (born April 16, 1977) is a Spanish comic book artist, best known for his work on The Immortal Iron Fist and Hawkeye.

== Career ==
Aja obtained a degree in Fine Arts at the University of Salamanca and served as a member of the faculty of fine arts from 1995 to 2000.

He began working as a professional illustrator in Barcelona in 2000. He has conducted public lectures on illustration as Faculty of Fine Arts at both Universidad de Salamanca and Universidad Complutense de Madrid (UCM). His work includes CD covers, as well as computer graphics with collaborator Marcel·lí Antúnez Roca.

In November 2006, Aja and writers Ed Brubaker and Matt Fraction started the series The Immortal Iron Fist. In 2011 Aja provided art for David Lapham's Wolverine: Debt of Death one-shot.

In August 2012 he started a new Hawkeye series with writer Matt Fraction, as part of Marvel NOW!. The series was released to positive reviews, with critics praising the storyline and art styles. As artist on Hawkeye, Aja won the 2013 Eisner Award for Best Penciler/Inker (tying Chris Samnee) and won the 2013 Eisner Award for Best Cover Artist. Hawkeye won the 2014 Eisner Award for Best Single Issue (Or One Shot) and Aja again won the Eisner Award for Best Cover Artist for his work on the series.

In September 2020, DC Comics announced that Aja would be among the creators of a revived Batman Black and White anthology series to debut on December 8, 2020. This would also be his first work for DC.

== Personal life ==
He and his wife, Pilar, live in Valladolid, Spain.

== Bibliography ==
Interior comic work includes:

- X-Men Unlimited vol. 2 (anthology, Marvel):
  - "So This Guy Walks Up to a Fruit Whipz Counter..." (with David Hahn, in #11, 2005)
  - "Colossus: Dying Inside" (with C. B. Cebulski, in #14, 2006)
- Civil War: Front Line #3: "Futility" (with Paul Jenkins, co-feature, Marvel, 2006)
- Giant-Size Wolverine: "House of Blood and Sorrow" (with David Lapham, Marvel, 2006)
- Daredevil (Marvel):
  - "The Secret Life of Foggy Nelson" (with Ed Brubaker, in vol. 2 #88, 2006)
  - "On the Costa da Morte" (with Ed Brubaker, in vol. 2 #116, 2009)
  - "3 Jacks" (with Ann Nocenti, co-feature in vol. 1 #500, 2009)
  - "Game Room" (with Ann Nocenti, in Black & White anthology one-shot, 2010)
- The Immortal Iron Fist (with Ed Brubaker and Matt Fraction, Marvel):
  - "The Immortal Iron Fist" (in Civil War: Choosing Sides anthology one-shot, 2006)
  - "The Last Iron Fist Story" (with Travel Foreman, John Severin, Russ Heath Jr. and Sal Buscema, in #1-6, 2007)
  - "The Seven Capital Cities of Heaven" (with Roy Martinez, Scott Koblish, Kano, Tonči Zonjić and Javier Pulido, in #8-13, 2007)
  - "Happy Birthday Danny" (in #16, 2008)
- New Avengers #50 (with Brian Michael Bendis, among other artists, Marvel, 2009)
- Captain America #600: "One Year After" (with Ed Brubaker, among other artists, Marvel, 2009)
- Thor #600: "To Asgard! Forever!" (with Stan Lee, co-feature, Marvel, 2009)
- Secret Avengers (Marvel):
  - "The Secret Life of Max Fury" (with Ed Brubaker and Michael Lark, in #5, 2010)
  - "No Zone" (with Warren Ellis and Raúl Allén, in #18, 2011)
- Wolverine: Debt of Death (with David Lapham, one-shot, Marvel, 2011)
- Hawkeye vol. 4 #1-3, 6, 8-9, 11, 13, 15, 19, 21-22 (with Matt Fraction, Marvel, 2012–2015)
- The Seeds #1-4 (with Ann Nocenti, Berger Books, 2018–...)
  - The series was postponed indefinitely after issue 2.
- Batman Black and White #2: "The Devil is in the Details" (DC Comics, 2021)

=== Covers only ===
- Four #28 (Marvel, 2006)
- Invincible Iron Man #6, 8 (Marvel, 2008–2009)
- Immortal Weapons #1-5 (Marvel, 2009–2010)
- 5 Ronin #1-5 (Marvel, 2011)
- Black Panther: The Man without Fear #516 (Marvel, 2011)
- Green Arrow vol. 4 #12 (DC Comics, 2011)
- Red Skull #1-5 (Marvel, 2011–2012)
- X-O Manowar vol. 3 #1, 6 (Valiant, 2012)
- Bloodshot vol. 3 #1, 4 (Valiant, 2012)
- Archer and Armstrong vol. 2 #1, 3 (Valiant, 2012)
- Hawkeye vol. 4 #4-5, 7, 14, 16-18, 20 (Marvel, 2012–2014)
- Secret Wars: Hail Hydra #3 (Marvel, 2015)
- Ivar, Timewalker #1 (Valiant, 2015)
- Spider-Gwen #5 (Marvel, 2015)
- Karnak #1-6 (Marvel, 2015–2017)
- Howard the Duck vol. 6 #1 (Marvel, 2016)
- Scarlet Witch vol. 2 #1-15 (Marvel, 2016–2017)
- The Wicked + The Divine #21 (Image, 2016)
- Star Wars: Han Solo #1 (Marvel, 2016)
- Star Wars: Poe Dameron #4 (Marvel, 2016)
- Star Wars vol. 4 #21 (Marvel, 2016)
- The Punisher vol. 11 #5 (Marvel, 2016)
- Jessica Jones #1 (Marvel, 2016)
- 2000 AD 40th Anniversary Special #1 (Rebellion, 2017)
- All-New Iron Man and Avengers #9 (Marvel France, 2017)
- Hawkeye vol. 5 #1 (Marvel, 2017)
- Godshaper #1 (Boom! Studios, 2017)
- Star Wars: Darth Maul #2 (Marvel, 2017)
- Doctor Strange vol. 5 #4 (Marvel, 2018)
- Daredevil #600 (Marvel, 2018)
- X-Corp #1-5 (Marvel, 2021)
- Deadly Hands of Kung Fu: Gang War #1-2 (Marvel, 2023)

=== Other work ===
Aja did work for various Spanish publishers, such as:

- European Press, Publishers, and Magazines, which include El País, Men's Health, Rolling Stone, Cinemanía, Espasa, and Santillana
- El País newspaper
- Progresa (Promotora General de Revistas S.A.): Cinemania, Rolling Stone, Revista 40 and Blue Joven
- Hachette Filipacchi: Emprendedores and Ragazza
- Muy Extra and Reporter Corporate Publishing Company
- Covers illustrations: Espasa, Planeta, Oxford, Alfaguara, Aguilar, Ediciones B, Plaza & Janes, Punto de Lecture and Circulo de Lectores
- Illustrated books: Gaviota, Santillana, Anaya, Circulo de Lectores and Cruilla

== Awards ==
- 2008: Won the "Favourite Newcomer Artist" Eagle Award
- 2013: Won the categories "Best Penciller/Inker," along with artist Chris Samnee, and "Best Cover Artist" Eisner Award
- 2014: Won "Best Cover Artist." Hawkeye #11, by Matt Fraction and Aja, won "Best Single Issue (Or One Shot)" Eisner Award
