= Lei Kung (character) =

- Lei Kung as depicted in New Avengers (vol. 2) #25 (April 2012). Art by Mike Deodato (penciler), Will Conrad (inker), and Rain Beredo (colorist).

Publication information
- Publisher: Marvel Comics
- First appearance: Marvel Premiere #15 (May 1974)
- Created by: Len Wein; Roy Thomas; Larry Hama

In-story information
- Alter ego: Lei Kung
- Species: Human
- Notable aliases: Thunderer, Yu-Ti
- Abilities: Master martial artist; Immortality

Lei Kung the Thunderer is a fictional character appearing in American comic books published by Marvel Comics. He is a master martial artist whose pupils include his son Steel Serpent and Iron Fist.

Lei Kung was portrayed by Hoon Lee in the Marvel Cinematic Universe (MCU) Netflix television series Iron Fist.

== Publication history ==
The character first appeared in Marvel Premiere #16 (July 1974).

== Fictional character biography ==
Several millennia ago, after she was busted for training three cavemen, Fan Fei was chained up and watched as the cavemen were fed to Shou-Lao by Lei Kung. When Fei defeated Shou-Lao, Kung had Fei exiled from K'un-L'un. Sometime later, Kung is at the entrance of K'un-Lun when Fei comes across it. Kung states that Fei's sentencing was wrong and that he wants to bring her home. Fei declines, stating that Earth was her home and her fights here are just the beginning.

In the present day, Lei Kung tutors the young Danny Rand in martial arts at the insistence of Yu-Ti. After becoming Iron Fist, Rand battles Steel Serpent, Kung's exiled son, who seeks to claim Rand's power.

During the Tournament of Heaven, Yu-Ti's corruption is revealed to the populace and Lei Kung leads a rebel army called the Army of Thunder against him. After Nu-An flees K'un-Lun, Kung succeeds him as Yu-Ti.

During the Avengers vs. X-Men storyline, Iron Fist brings Lei Kung to take Hope Summers to K'un-L'un for training. As the Phoenix Force-powered Namor attacks Wakanda, Iron Man tells Kung to pull Hope back to K'un-L'un and seal the portal before Namor gets through. When the Phoenix Force-powered Cyclops attacks K'un-L'un, Kung meets with Hope outside the Cave of Shou-Lao, telling her that it is time for her final lesson. The two ride Shou-Lao into battle, but are blasted out of the air by Cyclops. Tapping into Shou-Lao's powers, Hope returns Cyclops to Earth, temporarily incapacitating him. K'un-L'un is rebuilt following the battle, but Kung refuses outside help in doing so.

The crazed android known as the One, believing itself to be Wendell Rand, attacks K'un-Lun in revenge for abandoning it and kills many civilians, including Lei Kung.

== Powers and abilities ==
The weapons master of K'un-Lun, Lei Kung is a martial arts expert, one of the finest in the Marvel universe. Due to consuming fruit from the Tree of Immortality, Lei Kung cannot age or die of natural causes although he can be killed in battle.

== In other media ==
Lei Kung appears in Iron Fist, portrayed by Hoon Lee.
