= Shou-Lao =

- Shou-Lao, Lei Kung, and Hope Summers as depicted in Avengers vs. X-Men #10 (August 2012). Art by Adam Kubert.

Publication information
- Publisher: Marvel Comics
- First appearance: Marvel Premiere #16 (July 1974)
- Created by: Len Wein (writer); Roy Thomas (writer); Larry Hama (artist)

In-story information
- Species: Chinese dragon
- Notable aliases: Shou-Lao the Undying
- Abilities: Superhuman strength, durability, and speed; Flight via wings; Fire breath; Color changing; Immortality; Resurrection

Shou-Lao (alternatively spelled Shao-Lao) is a fictional character appearing in American comic books published by Marvel Comics. Appearing primarily in association with Iron Fist, he is the source of power for him and other holders of the name.

== Publication history ==
Shou-Lao first appeared in Marvel Premiere #16 (July 1974) and was created by Len Wein, Roy Thomas, and Larry Hama.

== Fictional character biography ==
=== Ancient Times ===
Shou-Lao is an immortal Chinese dragon who became the source of power in K'un-L'un.

In 1,000,000 BC, as punishment for training three outsiders, Fan Fei was chained and forced to watch as the cavemen are fed to Shou-Lou by Lei Kung. After breaking out with the hope that she will die fighting Shou-Lou, Fei punched Shou-Lou on the scar on his chest and gained his powers, becoming the first Iron Fist in the process. The immortal Shou-Lao would reincarnate himself, beginning the longstanding tradition undergone by challengers to claim the Iron Fist mantle by slaying Shou-Lao in combat.

During a performance of the dragon riders of K'un-L'un for the entertainment of Yu-Ti, Shou-Lao went berserk and attacked the city's leader. He was killed by Quan-St'ar, who cut out the dragon's heart. Enraged at this, Yu-Ti banished Quan-St'ar from the city and revived Shou-Lao by melting his heart and placing it in a sacred cavern. Following this, claimants of the Iron Fist mantle had to both defeat Shou-Lao in combat and plunge their fists into his molten heart to gain his power.

=== Modern Times ===
When Danny Rand is training to become Iron Fist, he defeats Shou-Lao by striking his scar, burning the dragon-shaped tattoo on his chest. After defeating Shou-Lao, Danny plunges his hands into the brazier containing Shou-Lao's heart, charging him with the power of Iron Fist.

During the Avengers vs. X-Men storyline, the X-Men battle the Avengers in K'un-L'un. Hope Summers and Lei Kung arrive on the back of Shou-Lao, who blasts the Phoenix Force-empowered Cyclops. Hope unleashes a combination of dragon energy, fire, and chaos magic to banish Cyclops to the Moon.

When Shou-Lao is nearing death, Lei Kung and the K'un-Luans host a ceremony to prepare for his death and rebirth. The One and his army, with help from a turncoat Davos, attack the ceremony, killing Shou-Lao and Lei Kung. Davos attempts to steal Shou-Lao's reborn egg, but is prevented by Pei, who steals the egg and flees with it to New York City to seek out Danny. Shou-Lao's egg hatches under Pei's care, who promptly names the young hatchling Gork.

When the dragons of the Heavenly Cities, including Shou-Lao's previous incarnations, are being hunted down by the Hierophant for their power, Gork accompanies Danny, Pei, Luke Cage, and the Immortal Weapons in saving the dragons. With their ally Okoye, who had also been empowered by dragon chi, locked in combat against the dragon-empowered Hierophant and his forces, Pei reluctantly allows Okoye to kill Gork to obtain his power. Quan Yin creates a new egg from Gork's body.

When the gravely injured Lin Lie washes ashore to K'un-L'un, a fully grown Shou-Lao hatches from the egg and bestows Lie with his chi, saving his life and making him the new Iron Fist. Despite receiving Shou-Lao's blessing, Lie is dismissed as an illegitimate Iron Fist by several K'un-Luans for not undergoing the trial of defeating Shou-Lao for the mantle. During the A.X.E.: Judgment Day event, Lie is forced by the Progenitor to fight Shou-Lao to officially earn his title as Iron Fist. With Loki's help, Lie defeats Shou-Lao, but instead of killing him Lie asks Shou-Lao to willingly give him his power. Pleased with this, the Progenitor brands Lie's right arm with Shou-Lao's dragon mark, officially making him an Iron Fist.

== Powers and abilities ==
As a dragon, Shou-Lao possesses superhuman physical abilities and the ability to fly and breathe fire. Additionally, he does not age, is resistant to disease, and can camouflage himself.

== In other media ==
=== Television ===
- Shou-Lao appears in Ultimate Spider-Man, voiced by Mark Hamill via Nightmare. This version lacks wings.
- Shou-Lao makes a non-speaking appearance in a flashback in the Iron Fist episode "Dragon Plays with Fire".

=== Video games ===
- Shou-Lao appears in Lego Marvel Super Heroes 2.
- Shou-Lao appears in Marvel Rivals.
