= List of Marvel Comics characters: 0–9 =

== 4D Man ==
4D Man is a version of Kyle Richmond from Earth X, first appearing in Universe X #0 (2000). He was cursed by Mephisto to see the future, and he works alongside Isaac Christians, the Gargoyle, to document all of history. This is used as a framing device for 4D Man to be a narrator for the story. 4D Man is ultimately betrayed by Gargoyle.

== 8-Ball ==
8-Ball is the name of multiple characters appearing in Marvel Comics.

=== Jeff Hagees ===
- First appearance: Sleepwalker #2 (May 1991)
- Created by: Bob Budiansky and Bret Blevins
- Further reading: 8-Ball at the Grand Comics Database; 8-Ball at Marvel Database

8-Ball was created by Bob Budiansky and Bret Blevins, and first appeared in Sleepwalker #2 (1991). 8-Ball has no superhuman powers. Wearing a spherical helmet designed to look like a billiards 8 ball, he wields a concussive cue stick and exploding balls. Screen Rant listed him among the worst Marvel Comics villains introduced in the 1990s.

Jeff Hagees is introduced as a defense contractor and engineer who is also a skilled pool player. He develops problem gambling and adopts the villainous persona of 8-Ball to recoup his losses. 8-Ball first appears as an enemy of Sleepwalker, confronting him alongside 6-Ball, 9-Ball, and 11-Ball. Sleepwalker nearly captures 8-Ball until Rick Sheridan (the human to whom Sleepwalker is bound) wakes up, forcing Sleepwalker to return to Rick's mind. 8-Ball escapes.

When 8-Ball and Sleepwalker next meet, 8-Ball proves victorious; he distracts the hero by shooting civilians. He attempts to kill Sleepwalker, who manages to escape. Later, when Rick and Sleepwalker had switched bodies, 8-Ball and Hobgoblin each attack Rick, trying to kill Sleepwalker to win a $100,000 bet. The inexperienced Rick is no match for them, which makes 8-Ball realize that Rick is not Sleepwalker.

8-Ball joins Freezer Burn and Humbug into stealing a chip from Ricadonna's house, during which he is killed by Wrecker. Misty Knight and Colleen Wing later have Ricadonna arrested for orchestrating the hit.

8-Ball is later resurrected by Hood. For a time during the "Devil's Reign" storyline, he is the cellmate of Moon Knight at the Myrmidon, giving him another character to interact with and allowing for character growth. 8-Ball questions his choices after luring Moon Knight into a trap: unhappy with his identity as a failed supervillain and the assumptions that this creates about him, he changes his mind and goes back to save Moon Knight.

=== Second 8-Ball ===
An unnamed character wearing the 8-Ball costume appears in The Amazing Spider-Man #600. He is among the villains who battle Spider-Man and Daredevil at the Bar With No Name. 8-Ball escapes when the police raid the Bar With No Name.

=== Third 8-Ball ===
The third version of 8-Ball is introduced in The Superior Spider-Man #26. Created by Dan Slott, Humberto Ramos, and Victor Olazaba, this version of 8-Ball is recruited by Hobgoblin, who gives him one of Jeff Hagees' old costumes.

During the AXIS storyline, 8-Ball is among the supervillains gathered by Missile Mate to work with the Goblin Nation, claiming that Hobgoblin had abandoned him. 8-Ball goes on to join Swarm's Sinister Six before eventually returning to Hobgoblin's service.

== 803 ==
- First appearance: Venom: Space Knight #1 (November 2015)
- Created by: Robbie Thompson
- Teams: Agent Venom's crew
- Further reading: 803 at Marvel Database

803 is a service robot who joins Agent Venom (Flash Thompson)'s crew. He appears in the series Venom: Space Knight, where he plays a sidekick role. The character was created by Robbie Thompson, who described his history as if "C-3PO had stayed with Jabba for thousands of years", saying that this made the character "self effacing" and "somewhat suicidal". To help Agent Venom move without his legs, 803 builds him a set of prosthetic legs. This idea inspired editor Jake Thomas to focus on the wounded veteran aspect of Thompson's character, including a partnership between Marvel Comics and the Wounded Warrior Project.
