= Tarantula (Marvel Comics) =

Marvel Comics fictional character

The Tarantula is a fictional character name used by several characters, usually supervillains, appearing in American comic books published by Marvel Comics. Most of these characters are primarily depicted as wearing a red and blue suit with retractable blades.

The Anton Miguel Rodriquez incarnation of Tarantula made a cameo in his live-action debut in the film Spider-Man: Brand New Day.

== Publication history ==
The original version of Tarantula (Anton Rodriquez) was introduced in The Amazing Spider-Man #134 (July 1974). Writer Gerry Conway recalled how he created the character:

During the political upheavals in South America during the 1970s, there was a real sense that we, the United States, were somewhat culpable, both for supporting the repressive regimes that were in power, and in the case of Chile, actually assisting in the overthrow of the democratically elected government. So, in that environment, a character like the Tarantula was inherently political. But the real reason I wanted to write that particular story was something said by my good friend Don Glut, who was also writing for Marvel at the time. Don once asked, "Why aren't there international heroes from smaller countries, a third-world, or old-world Captain America, like say, Captain Serbo-Croatia?" We laughed, but I really liked that notion: Just because the United States came up with their guy, why stop there? Why stop with the larger countries, the superpowers?

Acting as a patriotic enforcer for the oppressive dictatorship of the fictional South American country of Delvadia (essentially a Delvadian equivalent to Captain America), his defining marks are his red stretch costume with a black tarantula on its chest and the poisonous spikes attached to his gloves and boots. The character was killed off in the early 1980s, but the Tarantula identity has been carried on by a series of successors (such as Luis Alvarez and Jacinda Rodriquez). A modern version of Tarantula (Maria Vasquez) is introduced in Heroes for Hire #1 (October 2006).

A character with the Tarantula name previously appeared in Ghost Rider #2 (April 1967) with no connection between this character and any of the other depictions.

== Fictional character biographies ==
=== Anton Miguel Rodriquez ===
Tarantula
- First appearance of the Tarantula in The Amazing Spider-Man #134 (July 1974). Art by Ross Andru.

Publication information
- Publisher: Marvel Comics
- First appearance: The Amazing Spider-Man #134 (July 1974)
- Created by: Gerry Conway; Ross Andru

In-story information
- Alter ego: Antonio "Anton" Miguel Rodriquez
- Species: Human
- Team affiliations: Brand Corporation; Boca Del Rios revolutionist forces Boca Del Rios fascist government
- Notable aliases: Tarantula, Taranty, El Tarántula, Mr. Valdez
- Abilities: Skilled martial artist Enhanced agility Finger claws and toe spikes incorporated into the costume, usually envenomed As Tarantula-like creature Superhuman strength Wall-crawling ability Organic webbing shot from buttocks

Antonio "Anton" Miguel Rodriquez is the first character to use the Tarantula codename.

Rodriquez was a revolutionary terrorist in the small fictional South American republic of Delvadia, and was expelled from his organization after needlessly murdering a guard during a robbery. Rodriquez allied with Delvadia's government, serving as a government operative and patriotic symbol. After alienating his masters, Rodriquez embarks on a criminal career in the United States.

Rodriquez is hired by the Brand Corporation to silence an informer, but is thwarted by Spider-Man. The Brand Corporation then orders him to kill Spider-Man. In an attempt to bestow him with spider-powers, Rodriquez is injected with a mutagenic serum and placed in an electrolyte bath. Will o' the Wisp disrupts the process, causing Rodriquez to transform into a spider-like creature. Rodriquez allows himself to be shot by police, killing him.

During the Dead No More: The Clone Conspiracy storyline, Rodriquez is among the supervillains who are "reanimated" in cloned bodies via Jackal's technology.

In the "Hunted" storyline, Rodriquez is captured and forced to participate in Kraven the Hunter's Great Hunt as a hunting target. He is grouped with several other captives as the Savage Six.

=== Luis Alvarez ===
Tarantula

Publication information
- Publisher: Marvel Comics
- First appearance: Web of Spider-Man #35 (February 1988)
- Created by: Gerry Conway; Alex Saviuk

In-story information
- Alter ego: Luis Alvarez
- Species: Human
- Notable aliases: Tarantula, El Arana
- Abilities: Skilled martial artist Enhanced agility Finger claws and toe spikes incorporated into the costume, usually envenomed

Luis Alvarez is the second character to use the Tarantula codename. He is a special government operative and a former captain in the Delvadian militia, but not given to terrorist activities. Acting more as a death squad/government enforcer, Alvarez is chosen by Delvadian government officials to be the second Tarantula, and undergoes a mutagenic treatment to increase his physical abilities. He is sent to the United States by the Delvadian government to eliminate political refugees from Delvadia, and to kill Spider-Man for what happened to his predecessor, but Spider-Man and Captain America defeat him. Working as a mercenary, Alvarez teams up with the Chameleon to eliminate Spider-Man and nearly kills Flash Thompson, but this plan fails and he is defeated by Spider-Man and Black Cat. Eventually, Alvarez is caught and murdered by the Jury.

=== Third version ===
Tarantula

Publication information
- Publisher: Marvel Comics
- First appearance: Spider-Man: Get Kraven #1 (August 2002)
- Created by: Ron Zimmerman; Al Rio

In-story information
- Alter ego: Unknown
- Species: Human
- Notable aliases: Tarantula
- Abilities: Skilled martial artist Enhanced agility Finger claws and toe spikes incorporated into the costume, usually envenomed

An unnamed character is the third individual to use the Tarantula codename.

A patron at the Bar With No Name, he and several other villains get into a brawl with Spider-Man and Kraven the Hunter. The Tarantula later fights the Runaways in Van Nuys, and is defeated by Nico Minoru.

Tarantula is among the supervillains fought by Old Man Logan for Mysterio's location. Miss Sinister telepathically takes information from Tarantula, then kills him.

=== Jacinda Rodriquez ===
Tarantula

Publication information
- Publisher: Marvel Comics
- First appearance: Agent X #6 (February 2003)
- Created by: Gail Simone; Alvin Lee

In-story information
- Alter ego: Jacinda Rodriquez
- Species: Human
- Team affiliations: Wild Pack
- Notable aliases: Tarantula, Lasher
- Abilities: Skilled martial artist Enhanced agility Finger claws and toe spikes incorporated into the costume, usually envenomed

Jacinda Rodriquez is the fourth character to use the Tarantula codename and the daughter of Anton Rodriquez. She and Marie Batroc are hired by the East Winds to go after Agent X, Taskmaster, and Outlaw. However, Taskmaster surprises Tarantula and Batroc and shoots them down.

Tarantula is later seen as an operative of Delvadia alongside Devil-Spider, assisting Spider-Man and Mockingbird in confronting El Facóquero (a.k.a. Warthog), Delvadia's drug lord and Norman Osborn's body double.

During the "Venom War" storyline, Tarantula joins the Wild Pack and assists them in fighting the Zombiotes as the Lasher symbiote's host.

=== Maria Vasquez ===
Tarantula

Publication information
- Publisher: Marvel Comics
- First appearance: Heroes for Hire #1 (October 2006)
- Created by: Justin Gray; Jimmy Palmiotti; Billy Tucci

In-story information
- Alter ego: Maria Vasquez
- Species: Human
- Team affiliations: Heroes for Hire
- Notable aliases: Tarantula
- Abilities: Skilled martial artist Enhanced agility Finger claws and toe spikes incorporated into the costume, usually envenomed

Maria Vasquez is the fifth character to use the Tarantula codename and a member of the Heroes for Hire.

Maria acts alongside the Heroes for Hire as the Superhuman Registration Act's enforcers for Iron Man.

While the Heroes for Hire investigate a black-market operation, a hit gets put out on the entire team; Maria experiences this when visiting the gravesite of her sister Rosa Vasquez, who was killed in the destruction of Stamford, Connecticut. After her father is killed by ninjas, Maria killed the ninjas herself and personally confronts Ricadonna but was also unable to avenge her father as desired.

The Heroes for Hire are paid to stop a dangerous group of thieves who had been using advanced exoskeletons to aid in robberies regardless of collateral damage or death left behind. The group's investigation resulted in Maria, Misty Knight, the Black Cat and Colleen Wing stopping the Grim Reaper and Man-Ape.

The Heroes for Hire are hired by S.H.I.E.L.D. to capture Moon-Boy and Devil Dinosaur at the Savage Land for study before getting recruited into something else, resulting in Maria's confrontation with Scorpion. She gets tortured due to Humbug turning on the Heroes for Hire for the Brood queen.

=== Kaine ===
Kaine, a clone of Peter Parker, used the Tarantula alias during the "Spider-Island" storyline.

== Powers and abilities ==
Anton Rodriquez is a great athlete with incredible agility, leaping skills and excellent in hand-to-hand combat. Additionally, he wears gloves with retractable razor-sharp finger claws and boots with two retractable razor-sharp spikes loaded with drugs that render his victim unconscious, or other harmful or lethal drugs and poisons. He is educated in military school, is an excellent hand-to-hand combatant and was skilled in various martial arts, particularly in kickboxing. When he was mutated into a giant tarantula-like creature thanks to the Brand Corporation's mutagenic serum, he gained superhuman strength and the ability to adhere to surfaces. However, in his final mutation into a human-sized tarantula, while he possessed superhuman strength, his limbs were not structured to enable him to lift (press) weights. Just before his death, he developed the ability to generate organic webbing.

Luis Alvarez had his strength, stamina, agility and reflexes enhanced to peak human levels, thanks to Dr. Karl Mendoza's formula. Like Rodriquez, he also wore retractable razor-sharp finger claws in his gloves, and two retractable razor-sharp spikes in his boots anointed with harmful or lethal drugs and poisons. Also, like his predecessor, he was educated in military school, was an excellent hand-to-hand combatant and was skilled in various martial arts, particularly in kickboxing.

Maria Vasquez uses hand-to-hand combat and the blades on her wrists and the toes of her boots as weapons. She is also a detective, capable of observation and forensic investigation, as well as a marksman who uses sharpshooting and knife throwing.

== Other versions ==
=== Ultimate Marvel ===
An alternate universe version of Tarantula from Earth-1610 appears in the Ultimate Marvel imprint. This version is a six-armed clone of Spider-Man created by Doctor Octopus. He attempts to help Spider-Man and Spider-Woman against his maker, but is killed as a result.

=== Earth-1048 ===
An alternate universe version of Tarantula from Earth-1048 appears in Spider-Geddon. This version possesses mechanical spider legs.

== In other media ==
=== Television ===
- A version of the Tarantula appears in the Spider-Man episode "Generations", voiced by Valenzia Algarin. This version is a battle suit that sports Anton Rodriquez's colors and Maria Vasquez's wrist blades.
- Maria Vasquez appears in the Your Friendly Neighborhood Spider-Man episode "Secret Identity Crisis", voiced by Anairis Quiñones. This version is James Sanders's girlfriend and wields a pair of gauntlets that can generate energy blades.

=== Film ===
- The Ultimate Marvel incarnation of Tarantula makes a non-speaking appearance in Spider-Man: Across the Spider-Verse as a member of the Spider-Society.
- The Anton Rodriquez incarnation of Tarantula appears in Spider-Man: Brand New Day.
