= List of Marvel Comics characters: R =

== R'Klll ==
R'Klll (sometimes spelled R'Kill) is a Skrull who is the wife of Dorrek VII, the mother of Anelle, and the grandmother of Hulkling.

== Raava ==
Raava is a character appearing in American comic books published by Marvel Comics. The character, created by Saladin Ahmed and Christian Ward, first appeared in Black Bolt #1 (May 2017). She is a Skrull pirate and the mother of Skragg. Raava was in a deep-space torture prison for being against the Skrull Empire, and worked with Black Bolt, Metal Master, Blinky and Absorbing Man to escape.

=== Raava in other media ===
Raava appears in Secret Invasion, portrayed by Nisha Aaliya. This version works as an agent for Gravik's resistance by impersonating James Rhodes in order to engineer political tensions between the United States and Russia before being killed by Nick Fury.

== Rabble ==
Rabble is a supervillain appearing in American comic books published by Marvel Comics. She first appeared in Miles Morales: Spider-Man (vol. 2) #1 (December 2022) and was created by Cody Ziglar and Federico Vicentini.

Raneem Rashad is a technopathic Jordanian American girl and a mechanical prodigy who failed to get into Brooklyn Visions Academy since Miles Morales got the last spot. This loss, coupled with her mother's death and father developing a neurodegenerative disease, drove Raneem into being the supervillain Rabble who plots to take revenge on Spider-Man.

== Paul Rabin ==
Paul Rabin is a character appearing in American comic books published by Marvel Comics. He first appeared in The Amazing Spider-Man (vol. 6) #1 (April 2022) and was created by Zeb Wells.

Paul is the son of Benjamin Rabin, also known as the Emissary, and studied mathematical quantum computation under his father and colleagues, stumbling upon information condensing cryptography that resembled symbols of Mayan scripts and other ancient languages. While Paul and the others were discovering "cheat codes" in reality, Rabin was communicating with Wayep and destroyed their Earth for power. Paul killed his father and survived on the decimated Earth for years until Spider-Man and Mary Jane Watson were marked and transported to his reality by their version of the Emissary.

When Peter tried to adjust his dimensional travel watch to send MJ back to Earth-616, MJ pushes him in while also killing Wayep in the process. As Spider-Man scrambles to save her, due to the time dilation between the two dimensions, she bonds with Paul and they adopt two surviving children named Owen and Stephanie. Paul also developed a prototype random powers generating gauntlet that MJ uses to fight off the monsters in their world. Peter, with the help of Norman Osborn, manages to return to their dimension to rescue them. When they come to Earth-616, MJ refuses to part with Paul and her new family, leading to tension between Paul and Peter.

The Emissary eventually returns to kill MJ, but he dies thanks to Ms. Marvel disguising herself as MJ, resulting in him making the wrong sacrifice. Stephanie and Owen are revealed to be magical constructs created by the Emissary and vanish. To cope with the loss of the children, MJ becomes the superhero Jackpot, with Paul operating as her man in the chair. Paul is nearly killed when Peter is infected by Norman Osborn's sins and becomes the Spider-Goblin, but is rescued by MJ. Paul and MJ take custody of Dylan Brock following the event of Venom War, though unbeknownst to him, MJ had become the new host of the Venom symbiote. MJ later breaks up with Paul after admitting their relationship has not been working for a very long time.

In the storyline Death Spiral, Paul is murdered by the serial killer Torment when trying to protect Dylan. Though not on Torment's target list, Paul is killed for being in his way, while also disregarded by him as someone with no significance to anybody.

=== Critical reception of Paul Rabin ===
Paul Rabin was negatively received by both comic book readers and critics, with much of the criticism centered on his role in separating Spider-Man and Mary Jane Watson to maintain the post-One More Day status quo, as well as lacking a distinct personality or meaningful character development. Reader backlash towards Paul was reflected in letters published in The Amazing Spider-Man (vol. 6), many of which criticized the character and his role in the series.

Comicbook.com's Misael Duran highlighted how Zeb Wells' efforts to portray Paul as a sympathetic and non-antagonistic figure ultimately left him feeling narratively insignificant. While criticizing toxic behavior directed at the character, Duran agreed that much of the criticism toward Paul was justified and joked that the comics would be better if he "pulled a Poochie and returned to his people."

Paul's death in Venom (vol. 6) #256, which leaked online prior to the issue's release, was reported to have been widely celebrated among portions of the fandom. Joshua Fox of Screen Rant described some the dismissive reactions from other characters as a "meta commentary" towards Paul's reputation while James Whitbrook of io9 remarked that "the issue handles Paul's death surprisingly cruelly", making it easy to read as reflecting years of fan hostility toward the character.

In the film Spider-Man: Brand New Day, Eman Esfandi plays MJ's unnamed boyfriend, who is identified as Paul in the film's subtitles and believed to be based on Paul Rabin. Esfandi subsequently denied that his character was Rabin, acknowledging the character's negative reception among fans.

== Radioactive Kid ==
Radioactive Kid is an unnamed young supervillain who wears a hazmat suit that holds back his radioactive abilities, which previously killed his father. He joins up with the Young Masters, who attack an abandoned Hydra base. During a fight with the Teen Brigade, Radioactive Kid is believed to have been killed.

In "Avengers Undercover", Radioactive Kid appears alive and has reunited with the other Young Masters, who now operate out of Constrictor's Snakepit in Bagalia.

== Radius ==
Radius

Publication information
- Publisher: Marvel Comics
- First appearance: (As Jared Corbo) Alpha Flight: In The Beginning #-1 (July 1997) (As Radius) Alpha Flight volume 2 #1 (August 1997)
- Created by: Steven Seagle; Scott Clark

In-story information
- Alter ego: Jared Corbo
- Species: Human Mutant
- Team affiliations: Department H Alpha Flight; X-Corps; Beta Flight; Hellhouse
- Abilities: Force field generation

Radius (Jared Corbo) is a superhero appearing in American comic books published by Marvel Comics. He is a former member of the superhero team Alpha Flight.

Jared and his younger half-brother Adrian (a.k.a Flex) were raised in an orphanage, which was actually a facility operated by the Canadian government's secretive Department H. While Adrian became shy, reserved and bookish, Jared became athletically inclined, aggressive, and arrogant. Both brothers manifested mutant powers after puberty, with Jared manifesting a personal force field that could not be shut down. He could also create extensions of the field to use as a ranged attack, and change the density of it, preventing even air from entering. The Corbo brothers and several other members of the new team were later reassigned to Alpha Flight's trainee team, Beta Flight.

Radius is later hired by X-Corps, a militaristic strike force founded by former Generation X headmaster and former X-Man Sean Cassidy, a.k.a. Banshee. The X-Corps was ultimately betrayed by its criminal members. Radius is defeated when Avalanche opens a chasm beneath him. Jared survives the fall, and is among the many mutants depowered during the "Decimation" event.

== Peggy Rae ==
- Further reading: Peggy Rae at the Comic Book DB (archived from the original); Peggy Rae at the Grand Comics Database

Margaret "Peggy" Rae-Burdick is a character appearing in American comic books published by Marvel Comics. The character, created by Geoff Johns and Gary Frank, first appeared in Avengers (vol. 3) #62 (February 2003).

Peggy Rae is the ex-wife of Scott Lang and together had a daughter named Cassandra Lang. She remarries to police officer Blake Burdick. Peggy has an uneven relationship with Scott due to their divorce and has some slight resentment towards superheroes in general. She gets a court ruling that limits the amount of time Scott can spend with their daughter. After the events of Avengers Disassembled, Peggy and Blake got into an argument with Cassie resulting in Peggy slapping her. This pushed Cassie into joining the Young Avengers. For a while, it became apparent that Peggy and Blake did not know of Cassie's double life, but soon began to suspect that she was "the Giant Girl". Peggy learns from Jessica Jones that Cassie had been stealing Pym Particles which worries her as she still thinks that Cassie had a heart condition that had since been cured. Since then, she has forbidden her from anymore super heroics. Later on however, Peggy is upset at Cassie for supposedly injuring Blake accidentally. After some recuperating, Cassie calls Peggy and tells her that Blake will pull through resulting in mother and daughter apologizing and reconciling.

=== Peggy Rae in other media ===
A character based on Peggy Rae named Margaret "Maggie" Lang appears in the Marvel Cinematic Universe films Ant-Man and Ant-Man and the Wasp, portrayed by Judy Greer.

== Irani Rael ==
- Further reading: Irani Rael at the Comic Book DB (archived from the original); Irani Rael at the Grand Comics Database

Irani Rael is an alien character in Marvel Comics. The character was created by Dan Abnett, Andy Lanning, Wellinton Alves and Geraldo Borges, and first appeared in Nova (vol. 4) #18 (December 2008).

Irani Rael is a Rigellian who was recruited into the Nova Corps after it was destroyed by the Annihilation Wave. She was chosen by the Xandarian Worldmind to become a Nova Centurion alongside new recruits Qubit, Malik, Tarcel, Morrow and Fraktur. Rael and her new comrades arrive on Earth to aid Nova Prime Richard Rider and his brother, Robbie, who had also become a new recruit.

She has since fought alongside the rest of the Nova Corps on Earth against such threats as the Serpent Society and Dragon Man. She aided in fighting the Imperial Guard and Emperor Vulcan, during which many of her comrades were killed. After fighting Ego the Living Planet, it became apparent to Rider that the new recruits did not have proper training, resulting in Rael and several others agreeing to be demoted. Rael became a Nova Millennian.

=== Irani Rael in other media ===
- Irani Rael appears in Guardians of the Galaxy (2015), voiced by Tara Strong.
- Irani Rael appears in media set in the Marvel Cinematic Universe (MCU).
  - Rael appears in Guardians of the Galaxy (2014), portrayed by Glenn Close. This version is a Nova Prime, the leader of the Nova Corps.
  - Rael was considered to appear in Avengers: Infinity War and Avengers: Endgame before being scrapped.
  - Rael appears in the What If...? episode "What If... Nebula Joined the Nova Corps?", voiced by Julianne Grossman.
- Irani Rael appears as a playable character in Lego Marvel Super Heroes 2.

== Tamara Rahn ==
Tamara Rahn

Publication information
- Publisher: Marvel Comics
- First appearance: Sub-Mariner #58 (Feb 1973)
- Created by: Bill Everett (writer); Steve Gerber (writer); Sam Kweskin (artist)

In-story information
- Team affiliations: Deep Six
- Notable aliases: Tamara of the Sisterhood

Tamara Rahn is a character appearing in American comic books published by Marvel Comics, primarily in association with Namor. She is a Banari, a humanoid aquatic alien from the planet Laab, and the last of her kind after her planet was destroyed and the other refugees were killed by the Atlanteans.

Initially, Tamara fought the Atlanteans, but was defeated by Namor and became an ally of his. She later took Tiger Shark as a lover.

== Raina ==
Raina is a character who originated in the Marvel Cinematic Universe before appearing in Marvel comics. Created by Brent Fletcher, she first appeared in "Girl in the Flower Dress" on Agents of S.H.I.E.L.D. (October 22, 2013), portrayed by Ruth Negga.

She is depicted as a recruiter for Project Centipede. In the second season, she is revealed to be an Inhuman, and develops a thorn-covered body and dream-based precognition. She is rescued from S.H.I.E.L.D. by Gordon and brought to Afterlife. During Daisy Johnson's time there, Raina is killed by Jiaying.

=== Raina in comics ===
Raina made her comic book debut in Inhuman Annual #1 (July 2015), by Charles Soule and Ryan Stegman. She is among those who received Lineage's message when he used the Inhuman Codex to contact every Inhuman in the world.

=== Raina in other media ===
Raina appears as a boss in Marvel: Future Fight.

== Rain Boy ==
Rain Boy (Carl Aalston) is a character appearing in American comic books published by Marvel Comics. The character first appeared in X-Men (vol. 2) #171 (August 2005), and was created by Peter Milligan and Salvador Larroca.

Rain Boy is a mutant whose abilities transformed his body into living water, forcing him to be held together using a containment suit. As a student at the Xavier Institute, he joins Gambit's Chevaliers team. It is not known whether Rain Boy retained his powers after the events of "Decimation"; however, he resurfaces during the Krakoan Age with his powers intact.

=== Powers and abilities of Rain Boy ===
Rain Boy's body is made of living water, which he can expel as pressurized blasts. His water is conductive, allowing individuals held within his body to share their powers with one another.

== Rebel Ralston ==
Robert "Rebel" Ralston is a character appearing in American comic books published by Marvel Comics. The character first appeared in Sgt. Fury and his Howling Commandos #1 (May 1963), and was created by Stan Lee, Jack Kirby and Dick Ayers.

A native of Kentucky, he was an accomplished horseman who was skilled with a lasso and a founding member of the original Howling Commandos led by Nick Fury Sr. during World War II.

After the war, Ralston was one of the founding members of the V-Battalion, and later elected US Senator of Texas. He rejoined his old comrades, the Howling Commandos, and Captain America, and survived an assassination attempt while co-chairing the Senate Defense Committee. He has worked closely with S.H.I.E.L.D. and the Commission on Superhuman Activities.

Ralston attended a weapons expo with Daisy Johnson and Nick Fury Jr., but is killed during the Scientist Supreme's theft of the Iron Patriot armor.

=== Rebel Ralston in other media ===
Rebel Ralston makes a non-speaking appearance in The Avengers: Earth's Mightiest Heroes episode "Meet Captain America" as a member of the Howling Commandos.

== Ramonda ==
Ramonda is a character appearing in American comic books published by Marvel Comics. She is the queen mother of Wakanda, mother to Shuri and step-mother to T'Challa. The character, created by Don McGregor and Gene Colan, first appeared in Marvel Comics Presents #14 (March 1989).

=== Ramonda in other media ===
Ramonda appears in media set in the Marvel Cinematic Universe, portrayed by Angela Bassett.

== Ramrod ==
Ramrod is the name of two characters in Marvel Comics.

=== Cyborg version ===
Ramrod is a foreman on an offshore oil rig. He was turned into a cyborg by corrupt attorney Kerwin J. Broderick and Moondragon, using the advanced technology of Titan. He was given a steel skeleton and superhuman strength. This steel-skulled mercenary was sent to battle heroes in San Francisco. He then teamed with Dark Messiah and Terrex in Kerwin J. Broderick's attempt to take over San Francisco.

Ramrod has superhuman strength, stamina, and durability. He possesses a steel skeleton; various visible portions of his body are also plated with steel, including his head (except for his face and ears), the upper part of his chest and back, parts of his arms, and his knuckles. Ramrod is a good hand-to-hand combatant, using street fighting methods.

=== Patrick Mahony ===
Patrick Mahony is a mutant. His first appearance was in X-Factor #75. He was recruited by Mister Sinister to serve as the leader of the Nasty Boys, a group of young mutants whose only missions were against the government sponsored X-Factor. However, he and his friend Ruckus were more interested in beer runs and a quick buck than in Mister Sinister's agendas. In the Nasty Boys' first mission against the government version of X-Factor, Ramrod used his powers to great effect against the heroes, but he was ultimately subdued by the multiple fists of Jamie Madrox. Ramrod escaped, and disappeared after Sinister effectively abandoned the Nasty Boys. Ramrod can manipulate the fabric of wooden materials, causing them to grow at a fantastic rate and reform themselves into different sizes and shapes.

=== Ramrod in other media ===
The cyborg version of Ramrod appears in a cameo in the Marvel Cinematic Universe film Spider-Man: Brand New Day, portrayed by Billy Clements.

== Ramshot ==
Samuel Caulkin is a member of an armored group of vigilantes dubbed The Jury. Caulkin was recruited into the Jury by General Orwell Taylor to help him avenge the death of his youngest son Hugh. Samuel and Hugh were close friends from their time in the army. Soon after Hugh left the army he became a Guardsman at the Vault, a prison for super powered criminals. Not long after Hugh was murdered by Venom during his escape. Ramshot has a suit of armor that allows him to fly. He also emits a sonic type blast he calls a battering pulse.

== Rancor ==
Rancor is a mutant from an alternate future. The character, created by Jim Valentino, first appeared in Guardians of the Galaxy #8 (January 1991) as the leader of a world settled by mutants of the alternate timeline/reality Marvel Comics designated as Earth-691. Rancor is the leader of New Haven and claims to be a direct descendant of Wolverine. She initially crosses paths with the Guardians of the Galaxy when she is trying to eliminate the Resistance. She later steals one of Wolverine's claws from a Shi'ar museum as part of a plan to find her ancestor. In the course of her quest, she loses possession of the claw during a confrontation with Talon. She regains the claw when she is recruited by Doctor Doom. She eventually turns against Doom and discovers he is in possession of Wolverine's skeleton. The confrontation results in her being severely wounded and rescued by the Guardians of the Galaxy.

== Ransak the Reject ==
Ransak the Reject was created by Jack Kirby, and first appeared in Eternals #8 (February 1977). Ransak is a member of the race known as the Deviants. He is the son of Maelstrom (whose father, Phaeder, was an Inhuman) and Medula. He is shunned and feared by other Deviants because he is not subject to the deformity of their race, his humanlike (or Eternal-like) appearance seeming freakish to them. An outcast, he funneled his rage at his rejection into becoming an expert killer fighting in the gladiatorial arenas that became his home.

=== Powers and abilities of Ransak ===
Ransak has superhuman strength and durability sufficient to battle an Eternal in personal combat. He has a lifetime's experience in gladiatorial combat. He is prone to berserker-like rages during which he can ignore painful injuries and attacks.

== Ransom ==
Ransom (Valentin Correa) is a character appearing in American comic books published by Marvel Comics. Ransom first appeared in Uncanny X-Men (Vol. 6) #1 (August, 2024) and was created by Gail Simone and David Marquez.

Valentin is a mutant born to a wealthy couple from Buenos Aires who were ashamed of his mutant nature. He was once held for ransom which his parents never paid and was going to be killed by the kidnappers, but the bullets shot gave him the energy to fight back and kill them. He traveled to the United States where he joined with the Outliers, a group of young mutants pursued by Hag. The group goes on to join Gambit's Louisiana team of X-Men as their students.

Ransom has a black hole for a heart, allowing him to absorb energy and use it as strength and durability.

== Jennifer Ransome ==
Jennifer "Jenny" Ransome is a character appearing in American comic books published by Marvel Comics. Ransome first appeared in Uncanny X-Men #235 (June 1988) and was created by Chris Claremont and Rick Leonardi. Jennifer Ransome is a Genoshan mutant with the ability to increase her body size, with corresponding increases in strength and durability. She is depicted as having escaped Genosha due to their harsh treatment of mutants.

== Raptor ==
Raptor is the name of several characters in Marvel Comics.

=== Gary Wilton, Jr. ===
Gary Wilton, Jr. was among the many superhumans during the Civil War storyline trying to flee out of USA and into France but was confronted by the French superhero Peregrine over the Bay of Biscay, during a massive incursion tentative of refugees.

=== Brenda Drago ===
Brenda Drago was forced by her father into what was supposed to be a life of crime, as he gave her a suit equipped with functional wings (created from technology used in the costume he had worn as the second Vulture). Brenda became a flying thief known as the Raptor. However, her crime spree was stopped by the combined efforts of Spider-Girl and Buzz. Raptor ends up joining Spider-Girl and Buzz in the formation of a new New Warriors. She even fell in love with Spider-Girl's friend Normie Osborn, and the two became engaged.

=== Damon Ryder ===
Damon Ryder infiltrated May Parker's engagement party in Boston. He had stalked her relatives, the Reillys, for some time in an attempt to find Ben Reilly, who he claimed burned down his house and killed his family. He found Peter Parker, whom Ben was cloned from, and attacked him, believing him to be Ben. Peter was able to fend off Raptor's attack long enough to sneak off and change into his Spider-Man costume. The two battled, and Raptor was eventually defeated. However, he managed to escape while Peter was distracted at the shock of learning about Ryder's interest in Ben.

Ben Reilly once worked as a lab assistant to Ryder. The two became close friends during their work searching for proof of dinosaurs being human ancestors, with Ben meeting Ryder's wife and children. However, Ben soon discovered that Ryder had experimented on himself with raptor genes in an attempt to further their research. When he confronted him, Ryder grew angry and the two argued. Damon attacked Ben, but Ben managed to restrain him, hoping to bring in a geneticist to cure Ryder's mutation. Damon managed to escape in the interim, and Ben followed him to his home, where Damon revealed that he was starting to mutate, thus become more susceptible to Ben's assistance. As they talked, both were unaware that Ben's fellow clone, Kaine, was hiding just outside the house. Kaine jumped in through a window and attacked Ben, with a fire starting during the ensuing battle. It was then shown that Damon had murdered his own family, though he did not realize it, having been driven insane by his mutation.

In the present, Kaine breaks into the Parker house, revealing that he was working with Raptor, under the promise of being cured of his cellular degeneration. During the fight, he exposes Peter's identity as Spider-Man, and Ben's identity as a clone. He encourages Raptor to kill Peter, since anything Ben would do, so would Peter. Refusing to accept this, Peter affirms both his and Ben's innocence, proclaiming that neither of them would ever kill anyone, and beats Raptor unconscious, just as Ben had. However, Kaine takes Raptor and escapes before the police arrived. Raptor later tells Kaine that he lied about curing him to gain an ally. Enraged, Kaine breaks Raptor's neck, seemingly killing him.

== Rasputin IV ==
Rasputin IV is a character appearing in American comic books published by Marvel Comics. Both versions of her are a Mutant Chimera who was created from the DNA samples of Colossus, Kitty Pryde, Quentin Quire, Unus the Untouchable, and X-23. She wields a Soulsword and possesses the combined powers of her genetic donors: Colossus' metal skin and super-strength, Kitty's intangibility, Quire's telepathy, Unus's force field, and X-23's healing factor.

=== Powers of X version ===
First appearing in Powers of X #1 (July 2019), Rasputin IV is a member of Apocalypse's X-Men during Moira MacTaggert's ninth lifetime.

=== Sins of Sinister version ===
First appearing in Immoral X-Men #2 (March 2023), in the alternate timeline depicted in "Sins of Sinister", Rasputin IV is a chimera created by Mister Sinister, who sends her to find the Moira Engine in order to save the universe. Rasputin IV encounters Mother Righteous and recruits her into her Reliquary Perilous. Rasputin IV is later transported to Earth-616 and prevents Sinister from fleeing from the Quiet Council of Krakoa. Now residing on Earth-616, Rasputin IV becomes the Council's enforcer.

== Ratatoskr ==
Ratatoskr is a character appearing in American comic books published by Marvel Comics. She is based on the Norse Mythology creature of the same name.

== Rat King ==
The Rat King is a character appearing in American comic books published by Marvel Comics. The character, created by Christina Strain and Alberto J. Alburquerque, solely appeared in Generation X (vol. 2) #5 (August 2017).

The Rat King is the son of Piper of the Morlocks. Having inherited the ability to control animals via reed pipes, he forces the animals that lived in Central Park to do his bidding. Eye-Boy and Nature Girl discover this and head down to the sewers where the Rat King, shown as a glowing blue being, takes over Nature Girl and turns her against Eye-Boy. Using his abilities, Eye-Boy is able to see through to the real Rat King and finds that he is a pathetic pasty-looking young man in a paper crown. Eye-Boy beats up Rat King, refusing to hear his backstory, while Nature Girl and the park animals take their revenge out on Rat King threatening him not leave the animals alone.

=== Rat King in other media ===
An original incarnation of Rat King appears in Moon Girl and Devil Dinosaur, voiced by Daveed Diggs. This version is a humanoid rat who claims to be a normal rat before he was mutated into a humanoid form. Following his introduction in the episode "Teacher's Pet", he helps found the Felonious Four in "Moon Girl, Grounded".

== Raza ==
Raza is a character who originated in the Marvel Cinematic Universe before appearing in Marvel Comics. The character, created by Mark Fergus, Hawk Ostby, Art Marcum and Matt Holloway, first appeared in Iron Man (2008) where he was portrayed by Faran Tahir.

=== Film ===
Raza is the leader of the Ten Rings terrorist organization and launches an attack on a US Armed Forces convoy carrying Tony Stark. After kidnapping Stark, Raza and his team torture him until he agrees to rebuild the Jericho Missile for them. They slowly fail to realize that Stark and his fellow prisoner Ho Yinsen are actually building a suit of armor to escape and manage to do so, but not before scarring Raza's face. Raza and the Ten Rings later find remnants of Stark's Mk. I armor in the desert, but they were unable to rebuild the suit or understand its intricacies. He eventually contacted his benefactor, Obadiah Stane, who actually wanted Raza to kill Stark; Raza was unaware of who he was hired to kidnap and wanted Stark's weapons for himself. He planned on giving Stark's designs to Stane in exchange for "a gift of iron soldiers". Stane ends up betraying Raza and has all his men killed. Although not shown, it is assumed that Raza himself was also killed.

=== Comics ===
Raza made his comic book debut in The Invincible Iron Man Annual #1 (August 2010) from Matt Fraction and Carmine Di Giandomenico. He ends up fulfilling the same role from the film, retconning Stark's origin again and replacing his initial inspiration, Wong-Chu. Instead of Stane, Raza works directly for the Mandarin.

== Razorback ==
Razorback is the name of two characters in Marvel Comics.

=== Buford Hollis ===
Buford Hollis, a muscular truck driver and costumed adventurer from Texarkana, Arkansas, was in New York looking for his younger sister Bobby Sue, who had joined a religious cult. The group was led by Man-Beast (disguised as the Hate-Monger). It takes the combined efforts of Razorback and Spider-Man to defeat him and free Razorback's sister.

Taryn O'Connell, a fellow truck driver, spends some time searching for Razorback before he arrives in his oversized rig. They team up and use the rig itself to hijack NASA's experimental faster-than-light spacecraft, the Star Blazer. Though opposed by Mister Fantastic and She-Hulk, they succeed in stealing the spaceship. Razorback is determined to be a fitting pilot for the Star Blazer due to his mutant abilities allowing him to drive anything and is allowed to keep the ship with NASA's approval.

=== Hobgoblin's Razorback ===
In the storyline AXIS, Roderick Kingsley gave a copy of Razorback's costume to an unnamed person, who joins the Hob-Heroes.

=== Razorback in other media ===
- Razorback appears in several novels published by Byron Preiss in the 1990s.
- An alternate universe version of Razorback appears in the novel Spider-Man/X-Men: Time's Arrow, The Present by Tom DeFalco and Adam-Troy Castro.

== Reaper ==
Reaper is the name of several characters in Marvel Comics.

=== Gunther Strauss ===
- Further reading: Gunther Strauss at the Comic Book DB (archived from the original)

Gunther Strauss is a Nazi agent ordered by Adolf Hitler to cause a popular uprising in the United States. Acting as "the Reaper", Strauss travels to Manhattan and claims to be a religious prophet who had received an oracular vision. He exhorts people to abandon morality and to tear down the legal system and the federal government. Learning of his scheme, Bucky and Captain America pursue Reaper into the New York City Subway, where he falls on the electrified third rail and is killed.

=== Pantu Hurageb ===
- Further reading: Pantu Hurageb at the Comic Book DB (archived from the original); Pantu Hurageb at Marvel Database

Pantu Hurageb is a mutant in the X-Force comic book series. He generates a paralyzing wave that slows reaction times and also has prosthetic hands that he can morph into a scythe. Reaper has been a member of the Mutant Liberation Front. Reaper later became a hero in the Ultraverse before returning to Earth-616.

During the "Decimation" storyline, Reaper is among the mutants who lost their mutant powers. Reaper joins X-Cell, a group of former mutants who blame the government for causing M-Day.

=== Henry Manigo ===
Henry Manigo is a criminal who operated as Reaper while his brother Gilbert operated as Grim. Both of them are members of Tombstone's gang.

== Reaver ==
The Reaver is a supervillain in the Marvel Comics universe. The character, created by Chris Claremont and Herb Trimpe, first appeared in Captain Britain #1 (dated 13 October 1976).

The Reaver – real name Joshua Stragg – had access to high technology, including a variety of armoured suits, and a small gang of followers. He used these to storm the Darkmoor Research Laboratory in England, bursting through the walls at the control of a huge armoured vehicle. Wanting to gain the know-how of the staff to gain further riches he attempted to kidnap the facility's nuclear experts. Intern Brian Braddock attempted to run for help but was hit by the Reaver's hovercraft and surrounded by the villain and his men. However, Merlyn and Roma appeared to the student and granted him the powers of Captain Britain. The Reaver seized the Sword of Might and fought Captain Britain, but was defeated.

== Red Dagger ==
Red Dagger (Kareem) is a character appearing in American comic books published by Marvel Comics. He was created by G. Willow Wilson and Mirka Andolfo, and first appeared in Ms. Marvel (vol. 4) #12 (October 2016).

Kareem is a teenager from Badin who protects the streets of Karachi at night as the vigilante Red Dagger. When Kamala Khan and her family take a trip to Pakistan, she meets Kareem, who is revealed to be a family friend, and he stays with the Khan family during their vacation while studying for his university entrance exam. Red Dagger later teams up Kamala's superhero alter ego Ms. Marvel while on duty; the two are unaware of each other's secret identities.

After the Khans return to Jersey City, Kareem later joins them and attends Kamala's high school as an exchange student. Eventually Red Dagger and Ms. Marvel share their first kiss.

=== Powers and abilities of Red Dagger ===
Red Dagger is an accomplished martial artist, acrobat and marksman, with a preference for throwing knives.

=== Red Dagger in other media ===
Red Dagger appears in Ms. Marvel (2022), portrayed by Aramis Knight. This version lives in Karachi, Pakistan and is a member of the Red Daggers.

== Red King ==
Red King (Angmo-Asan II) is a character appearing in American comic books published by Marvel Comics. He was created by Greg Pak and Carlo Pagulayan for their Planet Hulk arc.

Before becoming the Father Emperor of Sakaar, Angmo-Asan II's father was an Imperial soldier-turned-warlord whose exploits united the nations of Imperia during the Wars of Empire and saved the planet from alien invasion during the Spike War. After his father died, Angmo II ascended to the throne and took the name "Red King". The Red King would go on to have almost all his sons and daughters slaughtered to ensure they could not take the throne from him.

The Red King still rules Sakaar when the Hulk is inadvertently exiled there. Initially, Hulk is enslaved and trained as a gladiator to fight for the entertainment of the Emperor. He gains attention as the Green Scar and Sakaarson, a mythical figure prophesied to rule Sakaar and heal it.

The Red King grows concerned and tries to have Hulk killed, entering a war with him. The Hulk leads his friends the Warbound and others against the Red King, eventually gaining the support of the King's own bodyguard, Caiera.

=== Red King in other media ===
- The Red King appears in Planet Hulk, voiced by Mark Hildreth.
- The Red King appears in The Super Hero Squad Show episode "Planet Hulk! (Six Against Infinity, Part 5)", voiced by S. Scott Bullock.
- The Red King appears as a playable character and boss in Lego Marvel Super Heroes 2.

== Red Lotus ==
Red Lotus (Paul Hark) is a mutant character appearing in American comic books published by Marvel Comics. He was created by Chris Claremont and Salvador Larroca.

Red Lotus was born in Sydney, Australia, to an American parent, and is the heir apparent to the Sydney Chinese Triad, which was run by his grandfather, who was known as Father Gow. When Gow was murdered, Red Lotus was led to believe that the culprit was Gambit by the Examiner, who wanted to gain control of the Triad for himself.

Red Lotus assisted the X-Treme X-Men team against Sebastian Shaw and Lady Mastermind after the truth was revealed, and later helped them while they were trying to repel an interdimensional invasion in Madripoor.

After the invasion on Madripoor, Paul became an ally to Viper and joined her undercover at the Hellfire Club hoping to shut down their mutant slave ring. He was almost murdered by Selene, but Marvel Girl was able to save him.

Red Lotus is a superhuman martial artist who possesses enhanced strength, speed, reflexes, agility, dexterity, coordination, balance, and endurance.

== Red Queen ==
Red Queen is the name of several characters in Marvel Comics.

== Red Ronin ==
Red Ronin (originally referred to as SJ3RX) was developed with the assistance of Stark International by scientist Tamara Hashioka and engineer Yuriko Takiguchi, and constructed in Detroit, Michigan. It was intended to be used by S.H.I.E.L.D. as a weapon against the monster Godzilla. Before it could be utilized for this purpose, the robot is stolen by Yuriko's 12-year-old grandson Robert and renamed Red Ronin. After an initial attempt to control the robot fails, Rob pilots Red Ronin into battle with Godzilla. Red Ronin is imprinted with Rob's brain patterns, making it useless without Rob to pilot.

The limited series Loners introduces a character known only as Namie, who was amnesiac after breaking out of a facility producing Mutant Growth Hormone. Julie Power looks after her while the other members of the group try to figure out what to do with her, but before anything can be decided, they are brought into a fight with Phil Urich. Urich agrees to return to Fujikawa with Hollow, while Namie stays with the Loners. Namie is revealed to be a cyborg entitled UJ1-DX.

== Red Skull ==
Red Skull is the name of several characters in Marvel Comics.

== Redeemer ==
Redeemer is the name of several characters in Marvel Comics.

=== Craig Saunders ===
Craig Saunders Jr., created by John Byrne, first appeared in The Incredible Hulk (vol. 2) #317 (March 1986). Fascinated by explosives every since childhood, he specialized in explosive ordinance disposal until he was too late with a mother and daughter killed by the bomb blast to which his military reputation had been permanently damaged as a result of bad press. Saunders is recruited into the Hulkbusters by Bruce Banner, vowing to redeem himself of his failings by doggedly hunting the Hulk and gaining a friendship with teammate Sam LaRoquette. After Banner re-merged with the Hulk due to separation causing cellular degeneration, Saunders used the Redeemer armor to hunt Rick Jones. The Hulkbusters are recruited by S.H.I.E.L.D. as an advisor alongside LaRoquette but were manipulated by the Leader into being a brainwashed pawn with himself and LaRoquette as Redeemer and Rock respectively. He is killed when the Hulk threw him on rock spikes.

=== Thunderbolt Ross ===
Thunderbolt Ross once used the Redeemer armor when fighting Hulk.

=== Shep Gunderson ===
Introduced in the "Dark Reign" storyline, Shep Gunderson is a therapist whose proposal of redeeming villains was shot down by Mayor J. Jonah Jameson. He took up the name of Redeemer and planned to cure evil by starting with Venom. To do this, Redeemer gathers villains like Dementoid, Doctor Everything, Eleven, General Wolfram, and Hippo who all had encounters with Venom.

=== Reginald Fortean ===
Reginald Fortean, created by Jeff Parker and Gabriel Hardman, first appeared in Hulk (vol. 2) #30.1 (May 2011). A US Air Force General and Thunderbolt Ross's protégé, he seeks revenge on the Red Hulk (unaware that Red Hulk and Ross are one person) by using his own Redeemer armor. During one of these outings, he briefly fought Omegex.

Reginald Fortean has since taken command of the anti-Hulk "Shadow Base" black ops as part of the U.S. Hulk Operations. He uses the organization to find a way to weaponize the gamma radiation. Fortean and Charlene McGowan later graft the tissue samples of Abomination to Rick Jones' corpse, resurrecting him as a creature that McGowan calls Subject B. After killing a depowered Walter Langkowski, Fortean accidentally fuses himself with Rick's Subject B husk, turning himself into the new Subject B. Hulk and Subject B end up killing themselves and are transported to the Below-Place. After talking to Doc Samson, Hulk kills Fortean.

== Redroot the Forest ==
Redroot the Forest is a mutant from Arakko who serves as the island's Voice, first appearing in X of Swords: Stasis (October 2020). She has the power to communicate with plants and generate a field of decay that rots organic material. Redroot is selected to participate in the X of Swords tournament on Arakko's team, wielding the sword Alluvium. For her fourth and final challenge, she wins a race against Captain Avalon, but is imprisoned by Mad Jim Jaspers for breaking a priceless relic during the contest.

In the aftermath of the tournament, Arakko reaches out to Sunfire and requests that he rescue Redroot. Sunfire travels to Otherworld and battles Redroot's captors, but MacTaggert stabs him in the heart with Redroot. Sunfire escapes with Redroot embedded in his chest. Redroot is later separated from Sunfire.

== Redwing ==
Redwing is a bird appearing in American comic books published by Marvel Comics. He is the bird sidekick to the Falcon. The character, created by Stan Lee and Gene Colan, first appeared in Captain America #117 (September 1969).

Redwing came from Rio where Sam Wilson bought him. They both ended up traveling to a deserted island where they accidentally encountered Nazis and the Red Skull. Due to an encounter with the Cosmic Cube, Wilson and Redwing form a telepathic bond that would allow Wilson to see through his eyes. Redwing remained Wilson's constant companion, but on the side joined the Pet Avengers.

In All-New Captain America #6 (2015), Redwing is bitten by Baron Blood and gains vampiric abilities. Shortly afterward, Karl Malus uses Redwing and Joaquin Torres in his experiments, transforming Joaquin into a bird hybrid using Redwing's DNA.

=== Redwing in other media ===
- Redwing appears in The Avengers: United They Stand.
- Redwing appears in The Super Hero Squad Show, with vocal effects provided by Steve Blum. This version is a member of the titular squad.
- Redwing appears in the Moon Girl and Devil Dinosaur episode "The Devil You Know", voiced by Bumper Robinson. This version is the sidekick of Rodney / Falcon and a member of the animal support group Action Buddies Confidential.
- Redwing appears in Iron Man and His Awesome Friends. This version is a robot created by Tony Stark and Sam Wilson.
- Redwing appears in media set in the Marvel Cinematic Universe (MCU). This version is a bird-like military drone utilized by Sam Wilson, who received four versions from Tony Stark, the United States Air Force, and Wakanda.
  - The first version of Redwing appears in Captain America: The Winter Soldier.
  - The first version of Redwing appears in Captain America: Civil War.
  - The first version of Redwing appears in Avengers: Infinity War.
  - The second version of Redwing appears in The Falcon and the Winter Soldier. It is destroyed during a fight with the Flag-Smashers in "The Star-Spangled Man". A third version of Redwing debuted in "One World, One People".
- Redwing appears in Lego Marvel's Avengers.
- Redwing appears in Marvel Avengers Academy.

== Regent ==
Regent is a character in Marvel Comics. He makes his first full appearance as the main antagonist of the limited series Amazing Spider-Man: Renew Your Vows, as part of the 2015 Secret Wars storyline. The Earth-616 version was introduced in the fourth volume of The Amazing Spider-Man.

=== Earth-18119 version ===
The Earth-18119 incarnation of Augustus Roman is the CEO of Empire Unlimited and developed technology that enables him to steal the abilities of superheroes after killing them. He kidnaps heroes from throughout his Battleworld domain, the Regency, before being defeated by Spider-Man.

=== Earth-616 version ===
The Earth-616 incarnation of Augustus Roman is largely similar to the Earth-18199 version. However, instead of killing superhumans to acquire their powers, he imprisons them in special cells and harnesses their powers via his suit.

=== Regent in other media ===
Regent appears in Spider-Man, voiced by Imari Williams. This version is Yuri Watanabe's mentor and holds a grudge against the Avengers for arresting his father, who was given a life sentence for what he saw as minor felonies.

== Replica ==
Replica is a Skrull from an alternate future and a member of the Guardians of the Galaxy and Galactic Guardians. The character, created by Jim Valentino, first appeared in Guardians of the Galaxy #9 (February 1991) as an inhabitant of the alternate timeline/reality Marvel Comics designated as Earth-691. Replica is a devout member of the Universal Church of Truth who lives in disguise on the planet New Haven under the rule of Rancor. When the Guardians of the Galaxy arrive, she joins them and the Resistance against Rancor. When the Guardians leave New Haven, she stows away on their ship as an insect only to be discovered by Yondu. Over time, she assists the Guardians against a Stark saboteur, the Spirit of Vengeance, and the Grand Inquisitor. She also reveals that she is a member of the Universal Church of Truth and a Skrull as she officially joins the Guardians. Later, to save the lives of the Guardians, she gives herself as a playmate to her god Protégé.

== Revolutionary ==
Revolutionary is a character appearing in Avengers: The Initiative Annual #1 created by Dan Slott, Christos N. Gage and Patrick Scherberger.

The Revolutionary was a Skrull secret agent, sent as part of a Skrull plan to conquer the Earth. The Revolutionary infiltrated the Liberteens, a superhero team based in Philadelphia who were the official government-approved superteam for the state of Pennsylvania. The Revolutionary was in contact with Criti Noll, the Skrull posing as Yellowjacket, speaking from Camp Hammond. He was a level-headed and respectful in his role as leader of the group.

When 3-D Man began his cross country effort with the Skrull Kill Krew to rid the Initiative of Skrull infiltrators, the Revolutionary was one of the Skrulls defeated. Gravity dropped the diamond-skinned Hope on top of the Revolutionary and dramatically amplified her mass, crushing him to a bloody pulp.

The real Revolutionary later attended a support group meeting at Camp Hammond for the S.H.I.E.L.D. agents and heroes who were replaced.

== Gabe Reyes ==
- Further reading: Gabe Reyes at the Comic Book DB (archived from the original); Gabe Reyes at the Grand Comics Database

Gabriel "Gabe" Reyes is a character in Marvel Comics. The character, created by Felipe Smith and Tradd Smith, first appeared in All-New Ghost Rider #1 (May 2014).

Gabe Reyes is the younger brother of Robbie Reyes / Ghost Rider. When his mother was pregnant with him, their uncle Eli Morrow shoved her down the stairs, resulting in Gabe being born with limited motor control over his legs. Gabe is also developmentally disabled and is need of constant attention from Robbie. Gabe looks up to his brother, but under the influence of Eli, the two begin to drift away from each other to the point that they begin fighting. Eli takes over Gabe and begins to go after his former boss, Yegor Ivanov. When Robbie rescues Gabe by taking Eli back and killing Ivanov, the brothers' faith in each other is restored.

=== Gabe Reyes in other media ===
- Gabe Reyes appears in Agents of S.H.I.E.L.D., portrayed by Lorenzo James Henrie. This version is a high school student who began using a wheelchair following an attack by a street gang called the Fifth Street Locos and is initially unaware of Robbie's activities as the Ghost Rider until Robbie tells him the truth about the night that they were attacked.
- Gabe Reyes appears in Marvel Tōkon: Fighting Souls, voiced by Josh Keaton.

== Rhapsody ==
Rhapsody

Publication information
- Publisher: Marvel Comics
- First appearance: X-Factor #79
- Created by: Peter David; Jim Fern

In-story information
- Alter ego: Rachel Argosy
- Species: Human Mutant
- Abilities: Flight; Musical mental manipulation

Rhapsody (Rachel Argosy) is a mutant supervillainess appearing in American comic books published by Marvel Comics. She first appeared in X-Factor #79.

Rachel Argosy was a teacher, until, at age 20, her hair and skin turned blue when her mutant powers developed. Despite being popular with the children, who nicknamed her Rhapsody, the parents complained about having a mutant teacher and, after a meeting of the school board, she was fired. Two days later, while trying to use her power to convince Harry Sharp, the leader of her detractors on the school board, to reverse its decision, he died of a heart attack while in ecstasy from her power. While fleeing from the police, she stole a violin and used the music from it to fuel her power of flight. The police then called X-Factor, who sent Quicksilver and Jamie Madrox to help capture her.

While Quicksilver helped bring her down and smashed her violin, she influenced the core Madrox with a flute, who, after his duplicates helped stop her, became angered and convinced Quicksilver to help him break her out. However, when she admitted to Madrox that Sharp had died, albeit not deliberately, at her hands, he rejected her angrily and returned her to prison. She is emotionally dependent on music and becomes depressed after an extended period without hearing it. She most recently serenaded the attendees of the Hellfire Gala.

While music is playing in the vicinity - usually through her playing her own violin - she can fly and warp minds to manipulate emotions, induce hallucinations in others, or control minds completely - though some are more susceptible than others. Rhapsody retains her powers post-M-Day. She is a talented violinist and flute player.

== Lila Rhodes ==
Lila Rhodes is a character appearing in Marvel Comics. The character first appeared in Iron Patriot #1 (March 2014), and was created by Ales Kot and Garry Brown. She is the niece of James Rhodes and the daughter of Jeanette Rhodes. Lila provides tech support.

== Roberta Rhodes ==
Roberta Rhodes is a character appearing in Marvel Comics. The character first appeared in Iron Man #173 (May 1973), and was created by Denny O'Neil and Luke McDonnell. She is the mother of James Rhodes / War Machine. Roberta is shown to be supportive of her son.

=== Roberta Rhodes in other media ===
Roberta Rhodes appears in Iron Man: Armored Adventures, voiced by Catherine Haggquist. This version is the legal guardian and attorney for Tony Stark after Howard Stark's disappearance.

== Terrence Rhodes ==
Terrence Rhodes is a character appearing in American comic books involving Marvel Comics. The character was created by Dan Abnett and Dave Chlystek, and first appeared in War Machine #12 (January 1995), though he goes unnamed until Iron Patriot #1 (March 2014). He is the father of James "Rhodey" Rhodes. Terrence provides support for his family and uses the Iron Patriot armor to help stop a conspiracy in which he sacrifices himself.

== Ricadonna ==
Ricadonna (known by her full name of Cecila Ricadonna) is a character appearing in American comic books published by Marvel Comics. She is one of the main characters in the Daughters of the Dragon comic series.

Ricadonna is a multi-billionaire. She is a crime boss and enemy of Misty Knight who has been previously apprehended by her. In her first appearance, 8-Ball, Freezer Burn, Humbug, and Whirlwind steal a computer chip from her while she is at a party. Ricadonna's teddy cam survives the thieves' expert robbery and she uses the footage to discover their identities. Freezer Burn and 8-Ball are killed by Razor Fist and Wrecker. Freezer Burn's girlfriend is also killed leaving their infant and orphan. Though Misty Knight and Colleen Wing would later have her arrested.

During the "Civil War" storyline, Ricadonna formed a team of supervillains called Ricadonna's Rogues, consisting of Blue Streak, Ferocia, Flame, and Kingsize. Ricadonna is implanted with Skrull organs, giving her electrokinesis, enhanced durability, enhanced stamina, shapeshifting, and super-strength.

== Zander Rice ==
- Further reading: Zander Rice at the Comic Book DB (archived from the original); Zander Rice at the Grand Comics Database

Dr. Zander Rice is a character in the Marvel Universe. He was created by Craig Kyle, Christopher Yost and Billy Tan, and his first appearance was in X-23 #1 (March 2005). His father Dale Rice worked on the Weapon X Program and was killed by Wolverine. Years later, Rice works on recreating the Weapon X experiment with his mentor Dr. Martin Sutter. He was eventually paired with Dr. Sarah Kinney, with whom he did not get along. When Sarah suggested making a female clone for Wolverine, Rice reluctantly agreed. Although Zander forced Sarah to carry the embryo to term, Rice proceeded to mistreat and abuse Laura Kinney who he called "Pet" and "Animal" following birth. Rice uses Laura's trigger scent to kill Sutter so that he can be in charge of the program and create more clones to sell on the market. Laura is later ordered by Sarah to kill Rice and destroy the facility. Laura gets back at Rice by calling him "Animal" upon his death. Rice hides a trigger scent in Sarah's hair, causing Laura to murder her.

=== Zander Rice in other media ===
Zander Rice appears in Logan, portrayed by Richard E. Grant. This version is the head of the corporation Alkali-Transigen who created the Transigen virus to sterilize mutantkind, which also caused the decay of Logan's healing factor and Charles Xavier's mental deterioration, in an attempt to make his own mutants as the Reavers were not as effective as he had hoped. After several mutant children escape from Transigen, Rice and the Reavers pursue to get them back, only to be killed by Logan.

== Gail Richards ==
Gail Richards is a character who originated in the film serial Captain America (Feb. 5, 1944), later appearing in the Ultimate Marvel universe. The character, created by Royal Cole; Harry Fraser; Joseph Poland; Ronald Davidson; Basil Dickey; Jesse Duffy and Grant Nelson, was portrayed by Lorna Gray.

=== Gail Richards in film ===
Gail Richards is the secretary to D.A. Grant Gardner, the serial's version of Captain America. Gail was well aware of Grant's double identity and would usually try to cover while Grant was off fighting crime and would contact to update on certain information. While Gail was the typical damsel in distress seen in films at the time, she did display a bit of a backbone every now and then and at one point managed to get the drop on some criminals. It was implied that she had feelings for Grant though this was never explored.

=== Gail Richards in comics ===
A character loosely based on her, also named Gail Richards, appeared in the Ultimate Marvel Universe. This character was created by Mark Millar and Bryan Hitch, and first appeared in The Ultimates #1. She was the fiancée of Captain America (Steve Rogers) before the man's supposed demise. She eventually becomes Bucky Barnes's wife, and the two have a family. In the early 21st century, Gail was shocked to learned of Steve's survival and youthful preservation, and emotionally refused to be reunited. However, they later rekindle a friendship. Unbeknownst to Rogers, Gail had conceived Captain America's son, and was "convinced" by the American government to give up their child to the military's supposed safety. In reality, the government trained her son to be the next super soldier who instead chose to be the Ultimate iteration of Red Skull. She is later given a chance to say goodbye to her son.

=== Gail Richards in other media ===
Gail Richards makes minor appearances in Ultimate Avengers and Ultimate Avengers 2, voiced by an uncredited actress.

== Annie Richardson ==
Annie Richardson is a character appearing in books published by Marvel Comics. The character was created by Chris Claremont and John Buscema, and first appeared in Bizarre Adventures #27 (June 1981). She was Jean Grey's childhood friend who was killed in a car accident, awakening Grey's telepathic abilities.

=== Annie Richardson in other media ===
Annie Richardson makes a non-speaking cameo appearance in the X-Men '97 episode "Fire Made Flesh".

== Right-Winger ==
- Further reading: Right-Winger at the Comic Book DB (archived from the original)

Right-Winger (Jerome "Jerry" Johnson) is a veteran and superhero in the Marvel Comics universe.

The character, created by Mark Gruenwald and Paul Neary, first appeared in Captain America #323 (November 1986).

Jerry Johnson was born in Philadelphia, Pennsylvania. He was a veteran who had served four years in the U.S. Army with his friend John Walker. Both became disillusioned and grew bored due to the lack of action during peace-time service. They both signed up for the Power Broker's strength augmentation process, and joined the Unlimited Class Wrestling Federation. Later, Walker approached him to form a team of superhumans, known as the B.U.C.s (Bold Urban Commandos) or "Buckies". This team consisted of Johnson, Lemar Hoskins, and Hector Lennox, and they all wore variations of Captain America's costume.

Walker, now known as the Super-Patriot, publicly speaks out against the original Captain America, and the Buckies pretend to be Captain America's supporters. The Buckies stage opposition to Walker and pretend to attack him at a rally in Central Park as a publicity stunt. Eventually, the Commission on Superhuman Activities selects Walker to replace Steve Rogers as Captain America, and choose Lemar Hoskins to be his partner Bucky (later Battlestar).

Lennox and Johnson are left behind, feeling betrayed and angered, and turn against Walker and Hoskins. The pair upstage the new Captain America at a patriotic rally and press conference, attacking him and revealing Walker's identity to the press out of jealousy over his newfound success. As a result, Walker's parents are killed by the Watchdogs, nearly driving Walker into a mental breakdown. Walker, blaming his former partners for his parents' deaths, ties them to an oil tank which is detonated by a torch-saber and leaves them to die. The two barely survive the explosion due to their enhanced physiology, leaving them terribly burned and in critical condition. After undergoing painful treatment for the burns they received, they commit suicide. When Walker learned of this, he was remorseful.

== Ringer ==
Ringer is the name of three characters in Marvel Comics.

=== Anthony Davis ===
A former engineer for NASA, professional criminal Anthony Davis becomes jealous of the wealthy Kyle Richmond. Designing a suit of battle armor that would be constructed by the Tinkerer, Davis, calling himself the Ringer, breaks into one of Richmond's buildings to rob it. Richmond confronts the Ringer in his guise of Nighthawk, breaking several of Davis's teeth in the process. Davis is arrested and jailed, where it took a prison dentist several weeks to rebuild his broken teeth.

Humiliated by his defeat, Davis decides that he is not cut out for a life of crime. He had previously designed an improved version of his old battlesuit, which remained in the Tinkerer's warehouse, which he plans to rent out to various criminal contacts as part of a get-rich-quick scheme. As Davis tests the suit, the Beetle breaks into the shop to retrieve his own upgraded equipment. Easily subduing the Ringer, Beetle forces Davis to wear the suit to battle Spider-Man, tricking him into thinking a new ring the Beetle had added to the suit would explode if the Ringer did not obey. The Ringer is dealt a humiliating defeat by Spider-Man, who breaks his repaired dental work and leaves him webbed for the police.

Shortly after being released from prison, the Ringer is nearly killed by the Scourge of the Underworld. Following these events, he is found and turned into a cyborg by agents of A.I.M.. He operates for A.I.M. under the name Strikeback until he strikes out on his own. After reuniting with his wife Leila, who was seeking to avenge his death on Spider-Man and the Beetle, they work together as members of the Redeemers until Strikeback dies after his cybernetical systems break down.

=== Keith Kraft ===
The designs for the Ringer battlesuit are used by another criminal named Keith Kraft who re-establishes the Ringer persona. He would prove to be as inept as Davis initially was. The Ringer teams up with Coachwhip and Killer Shrike to attack Moon Knight during the events of the Acts of Vengeance, a plan to destroy superheroes. He is defeated quickly. He is later employed by Justin Hammer, alongside Blacklash and Barrier. He attempts to trick Thunderbolt into stealing some experimental aircraft plans, but is foiled by the Hulk and the ancient society known as the Pantheon.

=== Hobgoblin's Ringer ===
Roderick Kingsley sells the Ringer gear to an unnamed criminal. Ringer, Steeplejack, and Tumbler are shown to be in the services of Kingsley. They are later ambushed by the Goblin King's servants Menace and Monster.

=== Powers, abilities and equipment of Ringer ===
Ringer's super abilities are entirely derived from his costume, which is equipped with wrist-mounted devices which create ring-shaped projectiles with variable effects, such as blunt missiles, explosives, cryogenic freezing missiles, and constriction devices. The suit also features several interlocking rings which can form a lasso, ladder or whip. The original suit could only produce a limited number of ring missiles; the Tinkerer's upgrades later included "particulate-matter condensers" which draw city smog and soot from the air, providing the suit with virtually unlimited ammunition.

As Strikeback, Anthony Davis had cybernetic enhancements which bestowed him with increased strength, stamina, and resillience to physical damage, flight capability via boot jets, inbuilt energy blasters, and teleportation ability.

== Rintrah ==
Rintrah is a character appearing in American comic books published by Marvel Comics. He is an other-dimensional mystic. The character, created by Peter B. Gillis and Chris Warner, first appeared in Doctor Strange #80 (Dec. 1986).

Rintrah is a green, minotaur-like creature from an other-dimensional planet called R'Vaal. There, because of his sensitivity to occult forces and his potential to become a skilled sorcerer, he is an apprentice to Enitharmon the Weaver. When Doctor Strange brings his Cloak of Levitation to Enitharmon for repair, the weaver sends Rintrah to return the restored cloak. After delivering the cloak, Strange briefly, and with permission, possesses his body to fend off Urthona. He remains with Strange for a time as his apprentice.

Rintrah later worked as a math teacher at Strange Academy.

=== Rintrah in other media ===
- Rintrah appears in Doctor Strange in the Multiverse of Madness and Marvel Zombies, voiced by Adam Hugill. This version is a member of the Masters of the Mystic Arts.
- Rintrah appears as a playable character in Marvel Contest of Champions.

== Dallas Riordan ==
Dallas Riordan

Publication information
- Publisher: Marvel Comics
- First appearance: Thunderbolts #1 (April 1997)
- Created by: Kurt Busiek; Mark Bagley

In-story information
- Alter ego: Dallas Riordan
- Species: Human
- Team affiliations: NYPD; V-Battalion; Thunderbolts
- Notable aliases: Citizen V, Crimson Cowl, Atlas, Vantage
- Abilities: None

Dallas Riordan is a character appearing in American comic books published by Marvel Comics. The character, created by Kurt Busiek and Mark Bagley, first appeared in Thunderbolts #1 (April 1997).

The daughter of Jim Riordan, Dallas's family that had a long storied history of being police officers. Dallas was once an NYPD officer and a soldier before she went into politics and became the aide to the mayor of New York. When the Thunderbolts arrived on the scene after the disappearances of the Avengers and the Fantastic Four, the mayor wanted to take advantage of the Thunderbolts' publicity and chose to appoint Dallas as the liaison between his office and the new team of "heroes". Dallas was unaware that her new associates were super villains in disguise, plotting to use their newfound publicity to get security clearances that would allow them to take over the world.

Dallas quickly began a flirtation with Erik Josten and the two were dating when the group gets exposed as villains. The Thunderbolts, led by Citizen V (by now Baron Helmut Zemo once again), soon made an attempt to take over the world. To save face, the mayor chose to blame Dallas for leading him astray and promptly fired her.

Furious over the way her life had been destroyed by the Thunderbolts, Dallas decided to join the V-Battalion as Citizen V. She became somewhat of a super-hero herself, first fighting Zemo, and then going up against the Crimson Cowl, before the latter framed her as the Crimson Cowl as a set-up to throw off the trail. Dallas was then arrested yet was rescued from prison by the V-Battalion.

Dallas is captured by the Crimson Cowl and held in a prison on the border of Symkaria and Latveria. She managed to find a means of escape but chose to confront the Crimson Cowl instead; the battle ended with her falling off a bridge and into a river. Dallas's back is crushed, requiring her to use a wheelchair for mobility. Dallas soon began to get visitations from her ex-boyfriend Erik who had been killed by Scourge.

The Thunderbolts, who had previously disbanded, reunited during a battle with Graviton. Dallas reasoned that the ionic-powered Erik's visitations were similar to Wonder Man's visitations of the Scarlet Witch who he used as an emotional anchor to tie him to the world after he had been killed. Erik did not have a body to come back to and instead channeled his ionic energy into Dallas. In their ionic state, Dallas's body could walk and had various superpowers. Atlas re-joined the Thunderbolts to fight Graviton but after the battle, Erik and Dallas found themselves and their teammates marooned on Counter Earth. When they returned, the ionic energy recreated the powerless Erik and Dallas retained a portion of the ionic energy. Thanks to the Fixer, Erik soon gained Pym Particle-related powers again.

Dallas joined the Thunderbolts as Vantage and chose to remain on the team to watch Zemo who she could not trust. Helmut eventually was scarred by Moonstone when trying to save Captain America. The Thunderbolts briefly disbanded and Erik asked Hank Pym to strip him of his new powers. Dallas and Erik broke up and Dallas took a job working for homeland security. Erik soon re-joined the Thunderbolts despite being powerless. After an encounter with Genis-Vell, Erik became enraged and tapped into his ionic powers, which left Dallas paralysed again.

Dallas is currently a full-time member of the CSA and even helped organize the battle between the Thunderbolts and the Avengers. Dallas and the CSA are apparently working with Zemo to save the world from the Grandmaster. Dallas does not trust Helmut, but gave Zemo the benefit of the doubt. Altered again by the Wellspring, during a battle against the Grandmaster in which he had to surrender his powers temporarily to Zemo, Josten was left stuck in a giant form, too heavy even to move and communicate. However, he was able to send back some ionic energy to Dallas, restoring her legs.

As Vantage, Dallas once possessed superhuman levels of agility and endurance. While sharing consciousness with Atlas, she was charged with ionic energy and could grow to great heights, fire ionic blasts, create a protective energy field, and fly.

== Riot ==
Riot is the name used by several characters in Marvel Comics.

=== Riot symbiote ===
The most common of the different interactions is the Riot symbiote, created by David Michelinie and Ron Lim, first appeared in Venom: Lethal Protector #4 (May 1993) and was named in Carnage, U.S.A. #2 (March 2012) after an unrelated purplish-black, four-armed action figure from the Planet of the Symbiotes storyline. It was created as one of five symbiote "children" forcefully spawned from the Venom symbiote along with Lasher, Agony, Phage, and Scream. Riot is usually depicted as a grey symbiote that primarily turns its appendages into melee weapons such as hammers and maces.

==== Trevor Cole ====
Riot's first host is Trevor Cole, a mercenary hired by Carlton Drake's Life Foundation in San Francisco. Cole is one of several employees to be bonded with Riot, along with Donna Diego (Scream), Leslie Gesneria (Agony), Carl Mach (Phage), and Ramon Hernandez (Lasher). Riot and his "siblings" are defeated by Spider-Man and Eddie Brock. The symbiotes' hosts kidnap Brock in an attempt to communicate with their symbiotes. When Brock refuses to aid them, Cole is killed along with Gesneria and Mach. The others initially believe that Brock was picking the group off, but the killer is later revealed to be Diego, having developed schizophrenia from Scream's influence.

==== Howard Ogden ====
Riot's second host is Howard Ogden, a Petty Officer assigned to the Mercury Team alongside Phage (Rico Axelson), Lasher (Marcus Simms), and Agony (James Murphy). With Cletus Kasady on the loose in Colorado, Ogden and the Team Mercury assist Spider-Man, Scorn and Flash Thompson. Nevertheless, Riot and his teammates are killed by Carnage in their secret base, and the four symbiotes bond with the Mercury Team's dog after the fight.

==== Third host ====
After being possessed by Knull, the Riot symbiote and his "siblings" take over a family, with him and Agony taking the unnamed patriarch and his wife Tess respectively while the Phage and Lasher symbiotes bond to the children Billy and Sadie before the group head to New York to help in Carnage's quest. They hunt Dylan Brock and Normie Osborn, but are defeated and separated from their hosts by the Maker. Under Knull's possession, the Riot symbiote merges with his "siblings" into one, but is defeated by Andi Benton.

==== Fourth host ====
The Riot symbiote's unidentified fourth host takes part in a conspiracy led by the Carnage symbiote. Riot assists the other three symbiote enforcers and Carnage until they are defeated by Thompson, Silence, and Toxin and contained in Alchemax's custody.

=== Heidi Sladkin ===
Heidi Sladkin is a member of the Skrull Kill Krew.

=== Heavy Mettle member ===
An unidentified version of Riot is a member of Joseph Manfredi's Heavy Mettle.

During the Dark Reign storyline, he is recruited by Norman Osborn to join the Shadow Initiative.

=== Riot in other media ===
- The Trevor Cole incarnation of Riot appears as a boss in Spider-Man and Venom: Separation Anxiety.
- The Trevor Cole incarnation of Riot appears as a playable character in Spider-Man Unlimited.
- The Riot symbiote appears in Venom, portrayed by Riz Ahmed. This version is the leader of a symbiote infiltration squad. After being brought to Earth by the Life Foundation's probe, Riot goes through multiple hosts before arriving in San Francisco and bonding with Carlton Drake in an attempt to bring more symbiotes to Earth. Riot faces and overpowers Venom in battle, then escapes into the Life Foundation's rocket until Venom ruptures its fuel tank as it launches, killing Riot and Drake in the explosion.

== Ripjak ==
Ripjak

Publication information
- Publisher: Marvel Comics
- First appearance: Guardians of the Galaxy #54 (November 1994)
- Created by: Michael Gallagher and Kevin West

In-story information
- Notable aliases: Interplanetary Serial Killer

Ripjak is a character appearing in American comic books published by Marvel Comics. He is from an alternate future universe and appears in the Guardians of the Galaxy comic book series.

Dubbed the Interplanetary Serial Killer by the media, Ripjak was a Martian antagonist, and later ally, of the Guardians of the Galaxy in the Earth-691 timeline of the Marvel Universe. It was later revealed that Ripjak was not the killer he was believed to be but rather an agent of mercy. He came to planets that had already been infected by the being known as Bubonicus and then wiped them out to prevent the contagions from spreading and end the suffering of those living there.

Ripjak wore an artificial exoskeleton and had enhanced abilities from a blood transfusion with Spider-Man.

== Matthew Risman ==
A trained sniper, Matthew Risman was in the middle of a hit when he suddenly received a call telling him to return to his home. Leaving his target, Risman rushed home, dragging his wife and daughter from their home seconds before a mountainside collapsed on it, completely obliterating it. As the trio looked at their damaged home, the man who had informed Risman of the coming disaster, William Stryker, appeared. Convincing Risman that he had access to knowledge of future events, Stryker recruited Risman into the Purifiers, a group who believed it was their holy mission to eradicate the few mutants who remained following M-Day.

After failing to kill Hope Summers, Risman regroups the Purifiers and resurrects Bastion to serve as an adviser and prophet to the Purifiers. He quickly learns, however, that Bastion is basically forcing Risman out, having resurrected many prominent killers of mutants, including William Stryker, Bolivar Trask, Graydon Creed, and others, to form a new alliance to destroy mutantkind. Risman then sends out his new personal army, the Choir, to attack Bastion and his loyalists at a rally being led by the resurrected Stryker, finding Bastion as the only apparent survivor.

Risman claims that Bastion and those he resurrected are not human and that the unholy abominations must be destroyed. Before he can stop Bastion, Archangel arrives searching for those who took his wings. During the commotion caused by Archangel and the arriving X-Force Risman goes after Magus but is surprised to find Eli Bard absorbing part of Magus. Risman tries to shoot Bard, but is unsuccessful. Risman is then shot and killed by X-23.

== Risque ==
Risque

Publication information
- Publisher: Marvel Comics
- First appearance: X-Force #51 (February 1996)
- Created by: Jeph Loeb; Adam Pollina

In-story information
- Alter ego: Gloria Dolores Muñoz
- Species: Human mutant
- Team affiliations: X-Corporation; X-Force; S.W.O.R.D.
- Abilities: Inorganic implosion; Peak-level endurance and agility

Risque (Gloria Dolores Muñoz) is a fictional character, a mutant appearing in American comic books published by Marvel Comics. Her first appearance was in X-Force #51 (February 1996).

Risque grew up in Florida to a Seminole mother and Cuban father. After her powers emerge, she falls in with Sledge. She contacts Warpath to meet with Sledge, striking a connection with the man. She interacted with X-Force a number of times before joining the X-Corporation. While on an investigation into mutant body part trafficking, Risque is killed by those involved, the U-Men. She was resurrected as an undead servant of Selene during Necrosha, and later was a member of S.W.O.R.D during the Krakoan Age.

Risque can create localized gravity fields, compressing inorganic matter into a small, high-density mass that she can telekinetically maneuver and propel at high velocities, as well as projecting concussive blasts of psychokinetic energy. Although, not at superhuman levels, she is naturally skilled in acrobatics.

== Rl'nnd ==
Rl'nnd is a character appearing in American comic books published by Marvel Comics. The character, created by Brian Michael Bendis and Jim Cheung, first appeared in New Avengers: Illuminati (vol. 2) #5 (November 2007).

Rl'nnd is a Skrull and the son of Rm'twr. Rl'nnd utilized the powers of the X-Men, specifically Colossus, Cyclops, Nightcrawler and Wolverine, during the Skrulls' invasion of Earth.

=== Rl'nnd in other media ===
- Rl'nnd appears in The Avengers: Earth's Mightiest Heroes.
- Rl'nnd appears as a boss in Marvel Heroes.

== Roberta ==
- Further reading: Roberta at the Comic Book DB (archived from the original); Roberta at the Grand Comics Database

Roberta is a character appearing in Marvel Comics. The character, created by John Byrne, first appeared in Fantastic Four #239 (February 1982).

Roberta is an android created by Reed Richards to work as the Fantastic Four's receptionist. She is known for her calm demeanor in the face of unusual situations and resembles a blonde haired woman with glasses down to the waist, with the rest of her body being a machine connected to a desk. When Kristoff Vernard blows up the Baxter Building, Roberta is also destroyed. After the Baxter Building is rebuilt, Roberta is resurrected with her memories intact. Roberta is later redesigned to have a silver body. She has since started dating former killer robot turned assistant mail man Elektro and the two started living together.

=== Roberta in other media ===
Roberta appears in Fantastic Four: Rise of the Silver Surfer, portrayed by Patricia Harras.

== Rock ==
Rock is the name of several characters in Marvel Comics.

=== Rocky Rhodes ===
Rocky Rhodes uses the alias of Rock as a member of the Satan's Saints biker gang.

=== Karl Serr ===
Karl Serr was born with an organic rock-skinned appearance because of experimentation performed by his mother Aunt Serr. Karl battles Namor, ending in his death.

=== Samuel LaRoquette ===
Samuel LaRoquette is a man who once worked as a college professor and a civilian advisor to S.H.I.E.L.D. He would later work as a member of the Hulkbusters. After Nick Fury shut down the Hulkbusters, Leader offered him and Craig Saunders Jr. the opportunity to help him defeat Hulk. Samuel was permanently bonded to a rock-like exoskeleton that grants him superhuman strength, enhanced durability, flight, and shapeshifting.

During the "Acts of Vengeance" storyline, Rock would later appear as a member of the Assembly of Evil.

Rock and Thunderbolt Ross in the Redeemer armor would later become a member of Riot Squad.

== Rocket Racer ==
Rocket Racer is the name of two superheroes appearing in American comic books published by Marvel Comics. The first, Robert Farrell, first appeared in Amazing Spider-Man #172 (September 1977). The second, Henry Sleeman, debuted in Amazing Spider-Man (vol. 2) #13 (January 2000). The characters are also supporting characters of the superhero Peter Parker / Spider-Man and the Avengers Academy.

=== Robert Farrell ===
Robert Farrell was born in Brooklyn, New York. The eldest of seven children, he became responsible for his younger siblings after his mother Emma became ill. After realizing that he cannot earn enough to support his family, Robert becomes the criminal known as Rocket Racer. He develops a rocket-propelled skateboard and rocket-powered gloves which give him the ability to hit an opponent with a rocket-powered punch. Following a series of encounters with Spider-Man, Rocket Racer decides to reform.

Rocket Racer goes on to join the training program at Camp Hammond, part of the Fifty State Initiative. He is seen working for MODOK to support his comatose mother and prevent repossession of their house. He turned out to have been working for S.H.I.E.L.D. all along, with a deal that they will give him the money he needs.

Rocket Racer is part of the new class of students when the Avengers Academy moves to the West Coast Avengers' former headquarters. He later leaves the Avengers Academy with Machine Teen.

=== Henry Sleeman ===
Henry Sleeman was hired by an unnamed employer to befriend Robert Farrell and steal the Rocket Racer gear. He did so, taking the name "Troy" and posing as Farrell's friend for months. When Farrell shows him where the gear is kept, Sleeman ties Farrell up and steals the gear. However, he is knocked out after running into a door, knocking himself unconscious.

=== Rocket Racer in other media ===
The Robert Farrell incarnation of Rocket Racer appears in a self-titled episode of Spider-Man: The Animated Series, voiced by Billy Atmore. This version is a teenager living in a crime-ridden neighborhood who is in constant trouble with the police and lives with a single mother whose store is constantly harassed by criminals demanding protection money. Despite this, Farrell works at the Science Center and studies under Peter Parker to develop his skill in gyro mechanisms. Using these and stolen technology from Jackson Weele, Farrell creates a cybernetically controlled, rocket-powered, magnetic skateboard to help his mother as the Rocket Racer. After being framed for a crime he did not commit however, Farrell is pursued by Spider-Man before they are both attacked by Weele. Spider-Man and Farrell join forces to defeat Weele before Farrell vows to use his scientific skills to help his mother instead.

== Barbara Rodriguez ==
Barbara Rodriguez is a minor character appearing within Marvel Comics. The character, created by Brian Michael Bendis and Sara Pichelli, first appeared in Spider-Men #1 (July 2017). She is Miles Morales's "first serious girlfriend".

== Joseph Rogers ==
Joseph Rogers is a minor character in Marvel Comics. He is the father of Steve Rogers. The character, created by Rick Remender and John Romita Jr., first appeared in Captain America (vol. 7) #1 (January 2013).

Born and raised in Ireland, Joseph took a bullet during World War I. He later married Sarah and the two emigrated to the United States. Sometime after his son's birth, Joseph could not find any work and turned into an alcoholic, abusing Steve and Sarah. He later died of influenza.

=== Joseph Rogers in other media ===
Joseph Rogers makes a non-speaking cameo appearance in the Avengers Assemble episode "The House of Zemo".

== Sarah Rogers ==
Sarah Rogers is a minor character in Marvel Comics. She is the mother of Steve Rogers. The character, created by Roger Stern and John Byrne, first appeared in Captain America #255 (March 1981).

Born and raised in Ireland, she married Joseph Rogers and the two immigrated to the United States. After she gave birth to their son, Sarah raised Steve to the best of her ability in New York City despite Joseph being an alcoholic and abusive. After Joseph's death, Sarah worked double shifts at a garment factory and took in laundry to help ends meet and support Steve, and died some years later of illness.

== Steven Rogers Jr. ==
Steven Rogers Jr. is a character appearing in Marvel Comics. The character was created by Rick Margopoulos and Dan Reed, and first appeared in What If? #38 (January 1983). He is the son of Steve Rogers / Captain America and Sharon Carter.

=== Alternate versions of Steven Rogers Jr. ===
An alternate Ultimate Marvel equivalent of the Red Skull is the secret son of Captain America and Gail Richards. This character was created by Mark Millar and Carlos Pacheco, and first appeared in Ultimate Comics: Avengers #1 (October 2009). After World War II, he is taken from Richards and raised on an army base where he appears to be a well-adjusted, physically superior and tactically brilliant young man. However, his easygoing personality was a ruse as he kills over 200 men and then cuts off his face which leaves a "red skull" for his likeness, and had a long career of working as a professional assassin. Eventually, Rogers joins A.I.M. so that he can steal the Cosmic Cube's blueprints, meeting Captain America and revealing his true identity. Rogers later takes control of the Cosmic Cube where he has a sadistic display of nearly unlimited power when confronting the Avengers led by Nick Fury (who is implied to have Rogers out of retirement) and Gregory Stark; he actually wanted to use the Cosmic Cube to manipulate time to have his family together with a normal life. Rogers is defeated when his father arrives in a stolen fighter jet which teleports to Hawkeye's exact coordinates. In a hospital, Rogers is kept alive long enough for his mother's goodbyes before he is killed by Petra Laskov.

The 2017 Secret Wars storyline features Ellie Rogers, the daughter of Steve Rogers and Sharon Carter in the Battleworld domain of the Hydra Empire. She is part of a resistance against Hydra and later becomes the symbiote-powered hero Viper.

=== Steven Rogers Jr. in other media ===
- A character based on Steven Rogers Jr. named James Rogers appears in Next Avengers: Heroes of Tomorrow, voiced by Noah Crawford. He is the son of Captain America and Black Widow.
- A female character based on Steven Rogers Jr. named Sharon Rogers appears as a playable character in Marvel: Future Fight. She is the daughter of Steve Rogers and Peggy Carter from an alternate timeline, and succeeded the former as Captain America.

== Richard Rory ==
Richard Rory

Publication information
- Publisher: Marvel Comics
- First appearance: The Man-Thing #2 (November 1973)
- Created by: Steve Gerber (writer); Val Mayerik (artist)

In-story information
- Team affiliations: The Defenders (former)
- Partnerships: Man-Thing; Omega the Unknown (former); She-Hulk (former)

Richard Rory is a fictional character appearing in American comic books published by Marvel Comics. He initially was created as an author surrogate for writer Steve Gerber, and was named after Richard Cory, whose song was playing on the radio when Gerber created the character.

Introduced as a supporting character for Man-Thing, Ohio based disc jockey Richard Rory would later become a brief love interest for She-Hulk.

== Roughouse ==
Roughouse is a supervillain appearing in American comic books published by Marvel Comics. Created by writer Chris Claremont and artist John Buscema, the character first appeared in Wolverine (vol. 2) #4 (February 1989). Roughouse is an Asgardian who is a recurring antagonist of the superhero Wolverine. Initially, Roughouse worked for General Coy, a crime lord, in Madripoor. Years later, Roughouse resurfaced while working for the terrorist organization Hydra and battling the Shadow Initiative, a government-operated black-ops group.

=== Roughouse in other media ===
Roughouse makes a non-speaking cameo appearance in the X-Men: The Animated Series episode "Whatever It Takes".

== Roulette ==
Roulette (Jennifer Stavros) is a mutant character appearing in American comic books published by Marvel Comics.

Roulette is a member of the Hellions who can generate energy discs that alter probability around them. She and the Hellions are killed by Trevor Fitzroy who uses their energy to fuel his time portals. Long after their deaths, the Hellions are resurrected on Krakoa.

== Rover ==
Rover is the name of two characters appearing in Marvel Comics.

=== Vehicle ===
A one-man vehicle version, created by Steve Englehart and Al Milgrom, first appeared in West Coast Avengers vol. 2 #21 (February 1987). Rover is an artificial intelligence created by Hank Pym.

==== Rover in other media ====
A character inspired by the vehicle version of Rover called Joey appears in Avengers Assemble, voiced by Roger Craig Smith. This version an AI assistant for Ant-Man.

=== Sentinel ===
A scavenged Sentinel version, created by Grant Morrison and Marc Silvestri, first appeared in New X-Men #151 (January 2004). Rover is reprogrammed by Tom Skylark to defend the surviving mutants from a possible timeline depicted in the storyline "Here Comes Tomorrow".

==== Rover in other media ====
The Sentinel version of Rover appears in Wolverine and the X-Men, voiced by Jim Ward.

== Donald Roxxon ==
Donald Roxxon is a supporting character in the Ultimate Marvel universe, which is separate from the "mainstream" Marvel Comics continuity. The character, created by Brian Michael Bendis and Mark Bagley, first appeared in Ultimate Spider-Man vol. 1 #86 (January 2006).

The inept CEO of a pharmaceutical company, he is attacked by Killer Shrike, Omega Red, and the Vulture (hired by the Tinkerer). Donald hires bodyguards to protect him, but is saved by Spider-Man.

== Phillip Roxxon ==
Phillip Roxxon is an exclusive character in the Ultimate Marvel storyline. Created by Brian Michael Bendis and Sara Pichelli, he first appears in Ultimate Comics: Spider-Man vol. 2 #22 (April 2013).

Apparently the true heir of Roxxon, Phillip secretly used guinea pigs in experiments to make super-soldiers (i.e. Bombshell and Cloak and Dagger), as well as the restoration of the Venom symbiote (which is stolen by biochemist Conrad Markus), and a benefactor of the Roxxon Brain Trust and the Prowler. Roxxon is personally defeated by a group of young heroes led by Spider-Man and arrested by Spider-Woman.

== Ruckus ==
Ruckus (Clement Wilson) is a mutant super villain in the Marvel Comics universe and leader of the Nasty Boys. Ruckus retains his mutant powers after the M-Day, but eventually becomes regretfel of his past actions. He willingly takes a mutant cure, which removes his powers, but damages his mind. After recovering, Ruckus is captured along with Ramrod to save them from being killed by Terrigen Mist.

=== Ruckus in other media ===
Ruckus appears in X-Men: The Animated Series, voiced by Dan Hennessey.

== Wal Rus ==
- Further reading: Wal Rus at the Comic Book DB (archived from the original); Wal Rus at the Grand Comics Database

Wal Rus is an anthropomorphic walrus character in Marvel Comics. The character, created by Bill Mantlo and Sal Buscema, first appeared in The Incredible Hulk #271 (May 1982).

Wal Rus is an engineer who aided Rocket Raccoon in his fight in the Toy Wars of which his niece, Lylla, is the center of conflict. His metallic tusks are interchangeable and can be used as tools or weapons. His adventures with Rocket are retconned when Rocket and Groot visited Halfworld and discovered that the halfworlders were actually service animals for mental patients.

=== Wal Rus in other media ===
- Wal Rus appears in the Guardians of the Galaxy episode "We Are Family", voiced by Kevin Michael Richardson.
- Teefs, a character based on Wal Rus, appears in Guardians of the Galaxy Vol. 3, voiced by Asim Chaudhry. This version is a genetically and mechanically augmented walrus who was created and later killed by the High Evolutionary.

== Rust ==
Rust is a member of the mutant political group called the Resistants and possesses mutant ability to cause metal to quickly rust, allowing him to corrode most metallic substances.

== Simon Ryker ==
Simon Ryker is a United States Army captain and a scientist who is the brother of Harlan Ryker. When he started his cyborg project, Simon Ryker created the Symbionic Man while trying to find the right energy source for it. While on a navy boat, he and those on board witnessed Namor and Doctor Doom's fight near the Hydro-Base. Ryker was able to siphon some energies from Doom. Though Doom was not pleased with it, he only spared Ryker as he was too busy wanting to finish off Namor. The energies enabled the Symbionic Man to come to life.

With the damage to the machinery rendering the energy transfer incomplete, Simon Ryker develops a device for Symbionic Man to siphon the brain patterns, strength, and power of another living being. They follow Namor to Rapa Nui and manage to copy his brain patterns. During Symbionic Man's fight with Namor, Ryker's ship is struck and sinks, freeing Symbionic Man from Ryker's control. Thinking that Ryker is dead, Symbionic Man returns Namor's powers to him and died. Ryker survives and became a general in the United States Army.

== Rynda ==
- Further reading: Rynda at the Comic Book DB (archived from the original); Rynda at the Grand Comics Database

Queen Rynda is a character appearing in American comic books published by Marvel Comics. The character first appeared in Thor #148 (January 1968) and was created by Stan Lee and Jack Kirby.

The wife of King Agon, Rynda ruled the Inhumans alongside her husband whom she was devoted to. Her Inhuman ability gave her immunity to poisons. While pregnant with her son Black Bolt, Agon exposed her to the Terrigen Mists resulting in Black Bolt being born with immense powers. Due to her immunity, Rynda resisted going through second Terrigenesis. She was killed alongside her husband by the Kree.

=== Rynda in other media ===
Rynda appears in the Inhumans episode "Behold... The Inhumans", portrayed by Tanya Clarke. This version was inadvertently killed by Black Bolt.
