= Jeri Hogarth =

Fictional character in Marvel comics

Jeryn Hogarth

Publication information
- Publisher: Marvel Comics
- First appearance: Iron Fist #6 (August 1976)
- Created by: Chris Claremont; John Byrne

In-story information
- Alter ego: Jeryn Hogarth
- Species: Human
- Team affiliations: Heroes for Hire
- Notable aliases: J-Money

Jeryn "Jeri" Hogarth is a character appearing in American comic books published by Marvel Comics. He is a friend of Iron Fist's father Wendell and an attorney for the Heroes for Hire, a team of heroes of which Iron Fist is a member.

Carrie-Anne Moss portrayed a gender-swapped version of the character in the Marvel Cinematic Universe (MCU) streaming television series Jessica Jones (2015-2019), Daredevil (2016), Iron Fist, and The Defenders (both 2017).

== Publication history ==
Jeri Hogarth first appeared in Iron Fist #6 (August 1976) and was created by writer Chris Claremont and artist John Byrne.

== Fictional character biography ==
After Wendell Rand's death, Jeri Hogarth became the executor of his estate, keeping Wendell's son Iron Fist under surveillance after his return to the states as well as hiring Misty Knight and Colleen Wing to contact him and verify that he was Rand's son.

Initially, Heroes for Hire, Inc. was a small business licensed by the state of New York that offered a full line of professional investigation and protection services. Heroes for Hire was owned by Luke Cage and Daniel Rand. It had offices on Park Avenue and two paid employees: Jeri Hogarth and secretary Jenny Royce.

During the 2006–2007 "Civil War" storyline, Hogarth opposes the Superhuman Registration Act. He stops Iron Man from arresting Iron Fist (who was posing as Daredevil at the time), stating that he is already a registered weapon in the United States.

== Reception ==
- In 2022, CBR.com ranked Jeryn Hogarth 9th in their "10 Most Powerful Lawyers In Marvel Comics" list.

== In other media ==
Carrie-Anne Moss as Jeri Hogarth as depicted in Jessica Jones

A female version of Jeri Hogarth appears in Marvel's Netflix television series, portrayed by Carrie-Anne Moss. This version is an openly lesbian senior partner at the Manhattan law firm of Hogarth, Chao & Benowitz and associate of Jessica Jones and Danny Rand who previously interned in Rand Enterprises' legal department. Hogarth first appears in Jessica Jones before making additional appearances in the Daredevil episode "A Cold Day in Hell's Kitchen", the first season of Iron Fist, and The Defenders.
