= Heroes for Hire =

Group of fictional characters

- The Oracle Inc. version of the team as seen on the cover of Heroes for Hire #1 (Aug. 1997)

Publication information
- Publisher: Marvel Comics
- First appearance: Power Man and Iron Fist #54 (December 1978)
- Created by: Ed Hannigan (writer); Lee Elias (artist)

In-story information
- Member(s): Members

Heroes for Hire are a superhero team appearing in American comic books published by Marvel Comics. The team first appeared in Power Man and Iron Fist #54 (December 1978), and was created by Ed Hannigan and Lee Elias. The team continued to appear in comics regularly over the years, and has made guest appearances in television productions and game environments featuring other superheroes.

== Publication history and original concept ==
The Heroes for Hire concept originated with solo series titled Luke Cage, Hero for Hire. As a "hero for hire", Cage tried to merge the usually pro bono world of superheroics with the bill-paying practicality of private investigation. Although the title changed to Luke Cage, Power Man in issue #17, Cage continued with his for-hire activities.

Initially, Heroes for Hire, Inc. was a small business licensed by the state of New York that offered a full line of professional investigation and protection services. Heroes for Hire was owned by Luke Cage and Daniel Rand (Iron Fist). It had offices on Park Avenue and two paid employees: Jenny Royce, the group's secretary, and Jeryn Hogarth, the group's lawyer and business representative. Heroes for Hire would not accept jobs that involved extra-legal activities.

== Fictional team biography ==
=== Power Man and Iron Fist ===
His own series cancelled due to low sales, Iron Fist joined the cast of Luke Cage, Power Man in a three-part storyline in #48–50. The comic's name changed to Power Man and Iron Fist from #50 upwards. The two formed a new Heroes for Hire, Inc., founded by attorney Jeryn Hogarth and staffed by administrative wunderkind Jennifer Royce. Iron Fist supporting cast characters Colleen Wing and Misty Knight also often appeared, although never becoming official members. This partnership lasted until the series' final issue #125, with Cage blamed for the apparent death of Iron Fist.

=== Heroes for Hire (1996) ===
In 1996, as a consequence of the "Onslaught" and "Heroes Reborn" storylines, the Marvel Universe suffered a power vacuum after the Fantastic Four and Avengers were presumed killed. Following up on the status of the Oracle Corporation that Namor had set up in the pages of Namor, Jim Hammond (the Golden Age Human Torch) and Danny Rand decided to set up a new Heroes for Hire organization. Iron Fist recruited Luke Cage for this. Heroes for Hire debuted in 1997, with a core team consisting of Iron Fist, Cage, and an assortment of hangers-on: Black Knight (Dane Whitman), White Tiger, Hercules, She-Hulk, Ant-Man (Scott Lang), Human Torch, and Deadpool. Heroes for Hire was written by John Ostrander and illustrated by Pasqual Ferry. It lasted for 19 issues before it was cancelled.

=== Heroes for Hire (2006) ===
A new Heroes for Hire series was developed as a spin-off of 2006's Civil War storyline. The book was initially written by Jimmy Palmiotti and Justin Gray (with art by Billy Tucci) who also wrote the Daughters of the Dragon miniseries. Many characters and plots followed from this series into Heroes for Hire. The series then changed hands and was written by Zeb Wells, with art by Terry Pallot. The team roster for the book is Colleen Wing, Misty Knight, Tarantula, Shang-Chi, Humbug, Orka, Black Cat and Paladin, the latter two joining for money. They serve as enforcers for the Superhuman Registration Act.

The Heroes for Hire discover a black-market operation that surgically implanted superhumans with Skrull organs that would endow those who had the operation with Skrull shapeshifting abilities. Several of these hybrid Skrull villains bust Misty Knight's old foe Ricadonna from prison. Ricadonna destroys the Heroes' headquarters by sending an explosive package, and puts hits out on the entire team. After they murder her father, Tarantula kills the entire gang herself. The team splits up in search of Ricadonna; while Knight and Colleen Wing try to shake up Toddler for information, Humbug uses his flies to discover Ricadonna's base—and also that she has somehow gained superpowers.

The team also comes into conflict with Grindhouse and the Headmen. Following these adventures, the Heroes for Hire became involved in "World War Hulk", being captured aboard Hulk's stone ship. Humbug turns on the group, but in turn is betrayed by Earth's hive, which had been using him from the start. Wing and Tarantula are heavily tortured, but are rescued by the rest of the team. Shang-Chi kills Humbug to avenge Tarantula's torture, and possibly out of mercy, as Humbug had mutated into a monster. Afterward the team splits up, with Paladin taking Moon-Boy in for the reward offered for his capture. Black Cat tries to appeal to Paladin's good nature, but Paladin kicks her away and informs her she does not know him at all. Shang-Chi departs the group carrying Tarantula in his arms. Knight attempts to console Wing, trying to encourage her that the team could still keep going, but Wing will hear none of it. Wing states that the moment the team sold their service as heroes they sold the best part of themselves. Wing walks away leaving Knight alone, signaling the complete end of team.

=== Heroes for Hire (2010) ===
In 2010, Marvel debuted a new Heroes for Hire series. The book spins off from the aftermath of the Shadowland storyline. This time, the team is run more like an organization, with revolving members, each hero in regards to the mission. Unlike previous incarnations, members work for benefits such as crime tips and backup when needed as opposed to money. The organization is originally run by a mind controlled Misty Knight with a team that includes Ghost Rider, Iron Fist, Moon Knight, Punisher, Black Widow, Paladin, Falcon, Silver Sable, and Elektra. After Paladin and Iron Fist free Knight from mind control, the other members find out and lose faith in the organization. Paladin convinces Knight to restart the operation from the ground up with him and earn the respect of the superhero community. The first to rejoin the operation is Spider-Man.

=== Power Man and Iron Fist (2011) ===
During the events of Shadowland, Luke Cage and Iron Fist meet Victor Alvarez, who was given powers during the event. Iron Fist becomes a mentor to the young hero, who takes on the name Power Man and joins Iron Fist as part of a new Heroes for Hire partnership.

=== Villains for Hire (2011) ===
In a new series spinning out of events from the end of Heroes for Hire, Misty Knight leads a new group of heroes consisting of Black Panther, Silver Sable, and Paladin. However, through yet known circumstances, she forms a sub-group of villains consisting of Bombshell, Crossfire, Nightshade, and Tiger Shark. The Villains for Hire team was led by Purple Man and Headhunter and the line-up consists of Avalanche, Death-Stalker, Shocker, and Scourge.

=== Mighty Avengers (2013) ===
In the series Infinity, Luke Cage is shown leading a new Heroes for Hire roster consisting of himself, White Tiger and Power Man. The team dissolves after White Tiger quits when the Superior Spider-Man considered the team mercenaries following a fight with Plunderer. The remnants of the group go on to form the new Mighty Avengers during Thanos's invasion of Earth.

=== Deadpool's "Heroes for Hire" (2015) ===
Eight months after the events of the Secret Wars storyline as seen during the All-New, All-Different Marvel event, Deadpool establishes a new team of Heroes for Hire. The roster consists of Solo, Madcap, Slapstick, Foolkiller, Terror and Stingray. Matt Murdock and Luke Cage are shown planning legal action against Deadpool. After the lawsuit goes through, Deadpool renames his Heroes for Hire group into Deadpool's "Mercs for Money."

=== Power Man and Iron Fist (2016) ===
In the All-New, All-Different Marvel era, Luke Cage and Iron Fist are forced to intervene when their former secretary Jennifer Royce becomes embroiled in a gang war with Black Mariah against Tombstone. After that is dealt with, Power Man and Iron Fist once again take to the streets as the Heroes for Hire.

== Members ==
=== First version ===
- Luke Cage
- Iron Fist

=== Second version ===
- Human Torch (leader)
- Ant-Man (Scott Lang)
- Black Knight (Dane Whitman)
- Hercules
- Iron Fist
- Luke Cage
- She-Hulk
- Thena
- White Tiger (evolved tiger)

=== Third version ===
- Misty Knight
- Colleen Wing
- Black Cat
- Humbug
- Orka
- Paladin
- Shang-Chi
- Tarantula

=== Fourth version ===
- Misty Knight
- Colleen Wing
- Black Widow
- Elektra
- Falcon
- Gargoyle
- Ghost Rider
- Iron Fist
- Moon Knight
- Paladin
- Punisher
- Shroud
- Silver Sable
- Spider-Man
- Stingray

=== Fifth version ===
- Iron Fist
- Power Man

=== Sixth version ===
- Luke Cage
- Power Man
- White Tiger (Ava Ayala)

== Collected editions ==
=== Volume One ===
Title	Material collected	Published date	ISBN
Luke Cage, Iron Fist & the Heroes For Hire Vol. 1	Spider-Man Unlimited #13, Marvel Fanfare #6, Heroes For Hire #1-9	December 2016	978-1302902292
Luke Cage, Iron Fist & the Heroes For Hire Vol. 2	Heroes For Hire #10-19, Quicksilver #11-12, Heroes For Hire/Quicksilver Annual '98	January 2017	978-1302904180

=== Volume Two ===
Title	Material collected	Published date	ISBN
Civil War: Heroes For Hire	Heroes For Hire (vol. 2) #1-5	August 2009	978-0785141808
Civil War: Heroes For Hire/Thunderbolts	Heroes For Hire (vol. 2) #1-5, Thunderbolts #101-105	April 2016	978-0785195665
Civil War: The Underside	Heroes For Hire (vol. 2) #1-3 and Thunderbolts #103-105, Moon Knight (vol. 5) #7-12, Civil War: War Crimes, Punisher War Journal (vol. 2) #1-3, Ghost Rider (vol. 6) #8-11	January 2011	978-0785148838
Heroes For Hire: Ahead of the Curve	Heroes For Hire (vol. 2) #6-10	September 2007	978-0785123637
Heroes For Hire: World War Hulk	Heroes For Hire (vol. 2) #11-15	January 2008	978-0785128007

=== Volume Three ===
Title	Material collected	Year	ISBN
Heroes For Hire: Control	Heroes For Hire (vol. 3) #1-5	July 2011	978-0785155812
Heroes For Hire: Fear Itself	Heroes For Hire (vol. 3) #6-12	February 2012	978-0785157953
Spider-Man: Spider-Island Companion	Spider-Island: Heroes for Hire #1 and Spider-Island: The Amazing Spider-Girl #1-3, Spider-Island: Cloak & Dagger #1-3, Spider-Island: Deadly Hands of Kung Fu #1-3, Herc #7-8, Spider-Island: Avengers #1, Spider-Island: Spider-Woman #1, Black Panther #524, Spider-Island Spotlight #1	February 2012	978-0785162285
Heroes for Hire by Abnett & Lanning: The Complete Collection	Heroes For Hire (vol. 3) #1-12; Spider-Island: Heroes For Hire; Villains For Hire #0.1, 1-4	August 2017	978-1302907099

=== Villains For Hire ===
Title	Material collected	Year	ISBN
Villains For Hire: Knight Takes King	Villains For Hire #0.1, 1-4	June 2012	978-0785160441
Devil's Reign: Villains For Hire	Devil's Reign: Villains for Hire #1-3, Devil's Reign: Moon Knight #1	August 2022	978-1302945909

== Creative teams ==
=== Writers ===
Volume One

- John Ostrander - Heroes for Hire #1–19 (July 1997–January 1999)
- Roger Stern - Heroes for Hire #1 (July 1997)

Volume Two

- Justin Gray - Heroes for Hire vol. 2 #1-7 (October 2006 - April 2007)
- Jimmy Palmiotti - Heroes for Hire vol. 2 #1-7 (October 2006 - April 2007)
- Zeb Wells - Heroes for Hire vol. 2 #7-15 (April–December 2007)

=== Artists ===
Volume One

- Pasqual Ferry - Heroes for Hire #1–10, 12, 15–16, 18–19 (July 1997–April 1998, June 1998, September 1998–October 1998, December 1998–January 1999); cover art #1–19 (July 1997–January 1999)
- Scott Kolins - Heroes for Hire #11 (May 1998)
- Martin Egeland - Heroes for Hire #13, 17 (July 1998, November 1998)
- Mary Mitchell - Heroes for Hire #14 (August 1998)

Volume Two

- Billy Tucci - Heroes for Hire vol. 2 #1-4, (October 2006-January 2007)
- Tom Palmer - Heroes for Hire vol. 2 #1, 2 (October & November 2006)
- Francis Portela - Heroes for Hire vol. 2 #2-5 (November 2006-February 2007)
- Alvaro Rio - Heroes for Hire vol. 2 #6-8 (March–May 2007)
- Clay Mann - Heroes for Hire vol. 2 #9-14 (June–November 2007)
- Alvin Lee - Heroes for Hire vol. 2 #14, 15 (November & December 2007)

== Controversy ==
The 2006 volume of Heroes for Hire was at the center of a controversy concerning increased sexuality in mainstream comic books due to what some considered explicit and objectifying cover art to Heroes for Hire issue #13. The controversy centered on what critics viewed as an inappropriate level of sexuality, objectification and infantilisation on the cover of a comic aimed at ages twelve and up. Marvel's official response to the outcry was to apologize if the cover "struck a chord that it was completely unintended to strike".

== In other media ==
=== Television ===
- The Heroes for Hire appear in The Super Hero Squad Show episode "A Brat Walks Among Us!", consisting of Iron Fist, Luke Cage, and Misty Knight.
- The Heroes for Hire appear in The Avengers: Earth's Mightiest Heroes, consisting of Iron Fist and Luke Cage.

=== Video games ===
The Heroes for Hire appear in Iron Fist's ending for Ultimate Marvel vs. Capcom 3, consisting of Iron Fist, Luke Cage, Misty Knight, and Colleen Wing as well as Capcom characters Ryu, Chun-Li, and Batsu Ichimonji.

=== Miscellaneous ===
The Heroes for Hire appear in the "Civil War" expansion for Legendary: A Marvel Deck Building Game, consisting of Colleen Wing, Humbug, Shang-Chi, and Tarantula.
