= Daughters of the Dragon =

Fictional comic book characters

- Cover of Daughters of the Dragon #1 (January 2006). Art by Khari Evans.

Publication information
- Publisher: Marvel Comics
- First appearance: Deadly Hands of Kung Fu #32 (January 1977)
- Created by: Chris Claremont (writer); Marshall Rogers (artist)

In-story information
- Member(s): Colleen Wing; Misty Knight

The Daughters of the Dragon are the duo of Colleen Wing and Misty Knight, fictional characters appearing in American comic books published by Marvel Comics. They first appeared as a team in The Deadly Hands of Kung Fu #32 (January 1977) in a story titled Daughters of the Dragon written by Chris Claremont and illustrated by Marshall Rogers. This followed the introduction of each individual character in mid-1970s Iron Fist stories.

== Publication history ==
=== Colleen Wing ===
Colleen Wing first appeared in Marvel Premiere #19 (November 1974), created by writer Doug Moench and artist Larry Hama. She is the first Asian female superhero in Marvel Comics. Comics scholar Troy Smith argues that the character was inspired by female heroes in kung fu films, such as Cheng Pei-pei in Come Drink With Me (1966) and Angela Mao in Enter the Dragon (1973) and a number of other films. Wing appeared in a number of storylines in Iron Fist and subsequently Power Man and Iron Fist.

=== Misty Knight ===
Misty Knight was first mentioned in Marvel Premiere #20 (January 1975). She debuted in Marvel Premiere #21 (March 1975), created by writer Jenny Blake Isabella and artist Arvell Jones. A later retcon in Marvel Team-Up #64 by Chris Claremont and John Byrne revealed she had previously appeared as an unnamed character in Marvel Team-Up #1 (March 1972), written by Roy Thomas and penciled by Ross Andru. She appeared in the 1977 Deadly Hands of Kung Fu series. Knight was one of the first Black comic book characters to play either a major or supporting role in the big two comic book houses, Marvel Comics and DC Comics. She was the first Black female superhero for Marvel. DC had previously introduced Nubia, a supporting character for Wonder Woman, in 1973. Troy Smith argues that Misty Knight reflects the popularity of female heroes in Blaxploitation films and TV of the 1970s, such as Pam Grier in Foxy Brown (1974), Jean Bell in TNT Jackson (1974), and Teresa Graves in Get Christie Love! (1974-1975).

=== Team up ===
The characters first appeared in Iron Fist and teamed up in the final two issues of Deadly Hands of Kung Fu (1977). Comics scholar Troy Smith situates the team in the 1970s cultural context of a shared audience for kung fu films and Blaxploitation; in particular, he compares them to the teaming of Tamara Dobson and Ni Tien in the film Cleopatra Jones and the Casino of Gold (1975).

The pair was first referred to by the name Daughters of the Dragon canonically in Marvel Team-Up #64 (December 1977). In the context of the story, the name comes from an attempted slight from Iron Fist foe Davos, the Steel Serpent, said in a tongue-in-cheek way while he flees from the two heroines. Despite the Daughters of the Dragon being given co-star billing in the issue, they appear in action for only a handful of panels, foreshadowing their status as perennial supporting characters who rarely starred in stories of their own. Since Iron Fist's first series had been cancelled at that time, the two characters followed him into the new Power Man and Iron Fist series (a merging of the Power Man and Iron Fist series), with Wing and Knight as supporting cast, who operated Knightwing Restorations Inc.

Among the few stories to feature the Daughters of the Dragon as the stars were 8-page stories appearing in Marvel Comics Presents #42 (January 1990), #80 (April 1991), and #149 (March 1994). The first two of these stories were written by former Power Man and Iron Fist writer Mary Jo Duffy.

In late 2005/early 2006 they gained a limited series which introduced both the style and many of the plots and characters that were later featured in the 2006 Heroes for Hire series.

The Daughters of the Dragon received an entry in the All-New Official Handbook of the Marvel Universe A-Z #3 (2006). They also appeared in a Heroes for Hire series (2006-2007).

Misty Knight and Colleen Wing were featured in the Luke Cage and Iron Fist Netflix series, which take place in a shared universe. Both characters were eventually paired, as in the comic. The success of the duo led Marvel to launch a new Daughters of the Dragon comic in 2018, by Jed MacKay and Travel Foreman. It was released as a digital comic.

== Powers and abilities ==
Colleen Wing is a martial arts expert and adept with swords, as well as a trained detective. She uses a katana. Misty Knight has fighting skills as well as a bionic right arm that augments her strength. Knight refers to her style as "Harlem kung fu".

== In other media ==
- A Daughters of the Dragon TV series was announced to be in development in 2001 by Marvel Studios and Tribune Entertainment, but was never produced. The series would have featured Colleen Wing and two other members.
- Misty Knight and Colleen Wing appear in Marvel's Netflix television series, portrayed by Simone Missick and Jessica Henwick, respectively. Following their introductions in Luke Cage and Iron Fist, the pair return in the miniseries The Defenders.
