= Colleen Wing =

Fictional character in the Marvel Comics

- Textless variant cover of Totally Awesome Hulk #11 (December 2016). Art by Stephanie Hans.

Publication information
- Publisher: Marvel Comics
- First appearance: Marvel Premiere #19 (November 1974)
- Created by: Doug Moench (writer); Larry Hama (artist)

In-story information
- Alter ego: Colleen Wing
- Team affiliations: Heroes for Hire; Daughters of the Dragon; Nightwing Restorations Ltd; The Nail; Infinity Watch
- Partnerships: Misty Knight; Iron Fist; Luke Cage
- Abilities: Skilled swordswoman; Skilled detective; Master martial artist; Utilizing concentrated chi grants: Enhanced strength; Accelerated healing; Possessing the Mind Stone grants: Telepathy; Dream communication; Psionic blade generation

Colleen Wing is a superheroine appearing in American comic books published by Marvel Comics.

Descended from a family of samurai, Wing is a Japanese martial artist who avenged her grandfather's death with the help of the superhero Iron Fist. After arriving in New York City, Wing befriended former police officer Misty Knight with whom she started a private investigation agency. The two would later form the crime fighting duo, the Daughters of the Dragon. As private investigators, Wing and Knight frequently work with the Heroes for Hire duo Luke Cage and Iron Fist. In the 2010 Daredevil storyline "Shadowland", Wing becomes the leader of The Nail, a splinter group of The Hand ninja clan.

Jessica Henwick portrayed the character in the Netflix television series Iron Fist (2017–2018), The Defenders (2017), and the 2018 second season of Luke Cage, set in the Marvel Cinematic Universe (MCU).

== Publication history ==
Colleen Wing first appeared in Marvel Premiere #19 (November 1974), created by writer Doug Moench and artist Larry Hama. She is among the first Asian female superheroes in Marvel Comics; arguably she was preceded by Mantis, who was introduced about a year prior. Comics scholar Troy Smith argues that the character was inspired by female heroes in kung fu films, such as Cheng Pei-pei in Come Drink With Me (1966) and Angela Mao in Enter the Dragon (1973) and a number of other films. Colleen Wing appeared in a number of storylines in Iron Fist and subsequently Power Man and Iron Fist, often working as a duo together with Misty Knight. They also appeared in a Heroes for Hire series (2006-2007).

== Fictional character biography ==
Colleen was born in the mountains of Honshu, Japan, to Professor Lee Wing (a teacher of Asian history at Columbia University) and a mother, Azumi Ozawa, whose ancestors were samurai and daimyōs. She is half-Chinese and half-Japanese. After her mother's death, Colleen's maternal grandfather Kenji Ozawa taught her the ways of the samurai. Professor Wing learned from a monk that young warrior Iron Fist would come from that land to seek vengeance on his father's killer and sent Colleen to meet him. Professor Wing and Colleen befriended Iron Fist, and Colleen has acted as his ally in many of his exploits. Colleen met Iron Fist and aided him in battling the Cult of Kara-Kai. Years later, Colleen went back to New York City to visit her father there. Upon arrival, she got caught in a gun battle by the local Manhattan police and some thugs. Luckily, she was rescued by officer Misty Knight, who eventually became her best friend. Later, when Knight's right arm was severely injured by a bomb explosion and was amputated, Colleen encouraged Knight to rise above her depression and return to an active role in life. Colleen and Knight formed a partnership as private investigators and called their firm Nightwing Restorations, Ltd. Due to Colleen's samurai-style training and both partners' expertise in the Asian martial arts, they are dubbed the Daughters of the Dragon.

Colleen later met the actor Bob Diamond, one of the Sons of the Tiger, and the two begin dating. After her relationship with Diamond ended, Colleen once again started up the Daughters of the Dragon organization with Misty as bondswoman. Colleen and Misty later create the new Heroes for Hire during the superhuman civil war.

Colleen has been identified as one of the 142 registered superheroes who have registered as part of the Initiative. In one of the group's missions, Colleen Wing and Tarantula were offered to the Brood Queen by their possessed teammate Humbug. When Shang-Chi and the other heroes come save them, Colleen is in traumatic shock; she is further agitated when Moon-Boy, whom the group had been hired to apprehend for S.H.I.E.L.D. is taken into custody by Paladin. Misty had made a deal with him to find both her and Tarantula after their capture. Colleen, deeply upset by this, leaves the group.

Following Daredevil's takeover of Hell's Kitchen during the "Shadowland" storyline, Misty, Colleen Wing, Iron Fist, Luke Cage, and Shang-Chi confront him in attempt to stop him without violence. After a commotion happens elsewhere in his castle, he attacks the group, believing they are responsible. Days after the fight, Colleen is contacted by Daredevil, offering information about her mother. Upon visiting him again, he reveals to her that her mother actually led a resurrected Hand group of all swordswomen called "the Nail". Colleen's mother and the Nail were eventually assassinated by one of the Hand's enemies. Daredevil then asks her to lead a new incarnation of the group. She eventually accepts and meets the Nail consisting of Black Lotus, Cherry Blossom, Makro, and Yuki. Colleen later betrays the Nail and has to defend herself against them.

During the "Blood Hunt" storyline, Colleen Wing and Morbius are abducted by vampires piloting a Beyond Foods truck while looking for a cure. When they get out and take an elevator to Floor Z4, they come across a floor filled with vampires. The ensuing fight is broken up by the vampire Theocritus, who subdues Colleen. He explains to Morbius that they are in Hemoglobin Inc. and that Morbius is needed him to complete the vampire cure.

During the "Infinity Watch" storyline, Colleen is contacted by Worldmind, the bearer of the Mind Stone, for protection from Thanos during his hunt for the Infinity Stone bearers. Colleen fails to prevent Thanos from killing Worldmind, and her katana is damaged during the confrontation. The Mind Stone then telepathically summons the Hulk to stall Thanos before choosing Colleen as its new bearer, enabling her to manifest a psionic blade from her katana and incapacitate him. However, Colleen initially struggles with her controlling her new powers while being hunted down by Nightmare for the Mind Stone, but she is able to defeat him with the help of Moon Knight. Colleen meets with the other Stone Bearers to form a new iteration of Infinity Watch and together, they are able to defeat Thanos when he battles them and the Avengers for their Stones.

== Powers and abilities ==
Colleen Wing was an athletic woman with no superhuman abilities. She has been extensively trained in the traditional combat skills of the Japanese samurai, including swordsmanship (Kenjutsu); she is a talented swordswoman and has been shown defeating several Hydra agents with no injury. She is also proficient in other martial arts such as Judo, Karate, and Iaidō.

After being brainwashed as a living weapon by Master Khan, Danny melds his mind with hers in order to break her free of this control. As a result, Colleen gains knowledge of K'un-L'un martial arts as well as chi control; allowing her to focus her chi to enhance her strength, accelerate her healing, and reduce her body functions to survive severe conditions.

She wields a 1,000-year-old katana which she inherited from her grandfather. Colleen is also a seasoned private detective with excellent investigative skills.

Upon becoming the bearer of the Mind Stone, Colleen gained several psionic abilities, including separating consciousness from the body, traveling through dreams, and creating bladed weapons out of psionic energy, which she can also channel through her katana, allowing it to cut both physical and mental forms.

== In other media ==
=== Television ===
Jessica Henwick as Colleen Wing in the television series Iron Fist.

Colleen Wing appears in Marvel's Netflix television series, portrayed by Jessica Henwick:

- First appearing in the first season of Iron Fist, this version runs a dojo in Chinatown, teaching self-defense lessons to disadvantaged youths. She meets Danny Rand, who initially challenges her before she gradually warms up to him when Ward Meachum attempts to bribe her. After convincing her to join him in his fight against the Hand by buying her building, becoming her landlord, and remitting her rent, Wing works with Rand to dismantle the Hand's operations and they gradually fall in love with each other, both unaware that her sensei Bakuto is a founding member of the Hand who used her dojo to find recruits. When Rand discovers this, he and Wing briefly part ways, though they quickly reconcile after Bakuto tries to have her killed by her own students.
- As of the miniseries The Defenders, Wing and Rand began traveling the world to find members of the Hand until they are attacked by Elektra Natchios and, following a dying Chaste member's last words, return to New York, where Rand battles Luke Cage until Wing and Claire Temple help the two work out their differences.
- Wing returns in the Luke Cage episode "Wig Out", in which she reunites with Knight and trains her to fight with one arm following the events of The Defenders.
- Wing returns in the second season of Iron Fist, in which she and Rand battle his brother Davos while she investigates the history of a brush and comb set marked with the symbol on her katana. By the end of the season, Rand passes the mantle of the Iron Fist to Wing upon discovering she is the descendant of Wu Ao-Shi, the first woman to defeat Shou-Lao.

=== Video games ===
- Colleen Wing appears in Iron Fist's ending for Ultimate Marvel vs. Capcom 3 as a member of his new Heroes for Hire.
- Colleen Wing appears as an assist character in Marvel Heroes. This version is a member of the Heroes for Hire.
- Colleen Wing appears as an unlockable playable character in Marvel Avengers Alliance.
- Colleen Wing appears as an unlockable playable character in Lego Marvel Super Heroes 2.

== Bibliography ==
- Cowsill, Alan (2021). The Way of the Warrior: Marvel's Mightiest Martial Artists. DK. ISBN 978-0-7440-2719-8.
- Smith, Troy D. (2024). Shaolin Brew: Race, Comics, and the Evolution of the Superhero. University Press of Mississippi. ISBN 978-1-4968-5168-0.
