= Misty Knight =

Marvel comics character

- Textless cover of Heroes for Hire #4 (May 2011). Art by Doug Braithwaite.

Publication information
- Publisher: Marvel Comics
- First appearance: Marvel Premiere #21 (March 1975)
- Created by: Jenny Blake Isabella; Arvell Jones

In-story information
- Alter ego: Mercedes "Misty" Knight
- Species: Human cyborg
- Team affiliations: New York City Police Department; Knightwing Restorations Ltd; Daughters of the Dragon; Heroes for Hire; Defenders; Valkyrior
- Partnerships: Colleen Wing; Luke Cage; Iron Fist
- Notable aliases: Maya Corday; Artemis-5; Control
- Abilities: Bionic arm granting: Concussive blasts projection; Control over magnetism; Superhuman strength; Technopathy; Expert martial artist and hand-to-hand combatant; Expert detective

Mercedes "Misty" Knight is a character appearing in American comic books published by Marvel Comics. Created by Jenny Blake Isabella and Arvell Jones, the character was first mentioned in Marvel Premiere #20 (January 1975) and first appeared in Marvel Premiere #21 (March 1975). Knight is the first Black female superhero in a publication by Marvel Comics; DC introduced a character named Nubia a year earlier.

Misty Knight is a former NYPD police officer whose arm was amputated following a bomb attack. After receiving a bionic prosthetic from Tony Stark, she started a private-investigation agency with a close friend, Colleen Wing. The two later formed the crime-fighting duo Daughters of the Dragon. As private investigators, Misty Knight and Colleen Wing frequently worked with the Heroes for Hire duo Luke Cage and Iron Fist. Misty Knight is often seen in a romantic relationship with the latter. They had the first interracial kiss between super heroes in mainstream comics in 1977. Misty Knight is also the co-leader of the Valkyrior with Valkyrie.

Simone Missick portrayed the character in the Netflix television series Luke Cage (2016–2018), The Defenders (2017), and the second season of Iron Fist (2018), set in the Marvel Cinematic Universe (MCU).

== Publication history ==
=== 1970s, '80s, and '90s ===
Misty Knight was first mentioned in Marvel Premiere #20 (January 1975). She debuted in Marvel Premiere #21 (March 1975), created by writer Jenny Blake Isabella and artist Arvell Jones. A later retcon in Marvel Team-Up #64 by Chris Claremont and John Byrne revealed she had previously appeared as an unnamed character in Marvel Team-Up #1 (March 1972), written by Roy Thomas and penciled by Ross Andru. She appeared in the 1977 Deadly Hands of Kung-Fu series and the 1981 Bizarre Adventures series by writer Chris Claremont and artist Marshall Rogers. She appeared in the 1991 Deathlok series. Troy Smith argues that Misty Knight reflects the popularity of female heroes in Blaxploitation films and TV of the 1970s, such as Pam Grier in Foxy Brown (1974), Jean Bell in TNT Jackson (1974), and Teresa Graves in Get Christie Love! (1974-1975).

=== 2000s and '10s ===
Misty Knight appeared in the 2005 Daughters of the Dragon series by writer Justin Gray, writer Jimmy Palmiotti, and artist Khari Evans. She appeared in the 2006 Heroes for Hire series. She appeared in the 2006 Immortal Iron Fist series. She appeared in the 2010 Shadowland series. She appeared in the 2013 Fearless Defenders series, by writer Cullen Bunn and artist Will Sliney. She appeared in the 2017 Black Panther & The Crew series.

== Fictional character biography ==
Misty Knight was a rising star with the NYPD when she was seriously injured preventing a bomb attack that forced the amputation of her right arm. Rather than take a desk job, she resigned from the police force, though she remained good friends with her long-time partner on the force Rafael Scarfe. Tony Stark provided her a bionic arm that endowed her superhuman strength. Soon after that, she met Spider-Man and then Iron Fist. Misty roomed with X-Men member Marvel Girl until Marvel Girl returned to her life as an X-Man. (Note: Years later, it was revealed that Misty's roommate was actually the Phoenix Force disguised as Jean. The Avengers #263; Fantastic Four #286)

Misty teamed with her friend Colleen Wing in fighting the criminal Emil Vachon in the Hong Kong area. She saved Colleen from an attempted beating. She then set up a private detective agency with Colleen entitled: "Knightwing Restorations Ltd".

Soon after she first met Iron Fist, the two crimefighters fell in love. Misty conducted undercover work against the crime lord Bushmaster. She aided Iron Fist, Spider-Man, and Colleen Wing against Davos, the Steel Serpent. She then first met and fought Luke Cage. Misty's "Knightwing Restorations Ltd" detective agency subsequently helped Power Man and Iron Fist's Heroes for Hire agency on numerous cases. Misty aided Iron Fist and Power Man in rescuing captives of Bushmaster and procured a videotape clearing Cage of crimes. Colleen later broke off her friendship with Misty due to Misty's relationship with Tyrone King. Misty rescued Iron Fist from drowning, reconciled with him, and ended her relationship with Tyrone King. Later, when Iron Fist broke up with her, Misty began a short romance with Power Man. This episode was a source of tension between Power Man and Iron Fist for a brief period.

Misty later learned of Iron Fist's apparent demise. Iron Fist is presumed dead for an extended period until Misty sees Super-Skrull impersonate him. She confronts Super-Skrull in his guise as Iron Fist. Misty assisted Namor in finding and saving the hero. They went to the Savage Land, where they learned that Super-Skrull had been posing as Iron Fist, and Misty aided Namor and Namorita against Super-Skrull. She and Danny Rand were ultimately reunited and renewed their relationship.

During the 2006 "Civil War" storyline, Misty Knight and Colleen Wing are contacted by Iron Man, Reed Richards, and Spider-Man to re-form Heroes for Hire and track down superhumans who refused to register. Initially hesitant, the pair eventually agree creating a team including Shang-Chi, Humbug, Orka, Black Cat, Paladin, and a new Tarantula. Misty is identified as one of the 142 registered superheroes who was part of the Initiative.

After the Civil War between the superheroes ended, Iron Fist was shocked to find that Misty had sided with the Initiative as he had joined the New Avengers. Nevertheless, when the Steel Serpent and Hydra plotted to kill Iron Fist and destroy the seven cities of heaven (the latter unbeknownst to Steel Serpent), Misty and Colleen rushed with Luke Cage to Danny's aid. Later, the three helped Danny stop a terrorist attack by Hydra on the mystical city of K'un-L'un where Danny told Misty, "I love you, Misty... but I make a lousy boyfriend". Though Danny said this, they continued a sexual relationship and finally committed to each other on his birthday, despite their disagreement over the Superhuman Registration Act.

Returning from a mission to capture Moon-Boy during the "World War Hulk" storyline, Heroes for Hire arrive in New York to see that it has been taken over by the Hulk. After being captured by the Warbound, Colleen Wing and Tarantula were offered to No-Name the Brood Queen by Humbug. Misty makes a deal with Paladin to take Moon-Boy (whom Colleen had become attached to) to find both Colleen and Tarantula after their capture. When Misty and the other heroes come to save them, Colleen is in traumatic shock from the torture she endured; she is further agitated when Moon-Boy is taken into custody by Paladin. Colleen, deeply upset by her friend's actions, leaves the group as a result. Heroes for Hire itself has disbanded permanently in the aftermath of this. Misty becomes depressed due to her actions that led to the breakup of the group. Iron Man later comes to her to enlist her aid in stopping the Hulk's remaining robots; through this, she was able to move past her mistakes.

Misty and Danny move in with each other in Harlem. Danny proposes to Misty and she accepts, after that she tells him that she is pregnant with his child. They have since found out that this was a false pregnancy, causing a strain on their relationship. They decide to move out of their apartment and live separately, but continue their relationship.

During the 2010 "Shadowland" storyline, Misty, Colleen Wing, Iron Fist, Luke Cage, and Shang-Chi confront Daredevil in an attempt to stop him without violence. After a commotion happens elsewhere in his castle, he attacks the group, believing they are responsible.

Following the events of the "Shadowland" storyline, Misty revamps the Heroes for Hire concept by basing herself as 'control' and utilizing various street heroes based on their powers and abilities in exchange for money or information. At the end of the first issue, it is revealed that Misty is being manipulated by the Puppet Master. Misty is later freed from mind control with help from Iron Fist and Paladin. After being freed, Paladin approaches Misty to continue the operation Puppet Master set in place, but on her terms.

As part of the Marvel NOW! initiative, Misty Knight showcases in the comic book alongside Valkyrie as a member of the Fearless Defenders.

Misty Knight appears during the 2015–17 All-New, All-Different Marvel promotion as a supporting character to Sam Wilson, the new Captain America, who is uneasy now that his friend Steve Rogers has regained his original moniker. Though the two men opt to share the name, many civilians in the Marvel Universe feel that Sam Wilson is undeserving of the title. Misty helps him deal with his doubts and is revealed to be in a sexual relationship with him as well. She then helps clear the names of female heroes and villains, who fell victim to a scandal over embarrassing sex videos posted on the internet.

During the "Hunt for Wolverine" storyline, Misty Knight has left the NYPD for an unknown reason. She is approached by Daredevil and Nur, who enlist her to help find Wolverine after his body disappears from his grave. She takes them to Cypher, who tells them about sightings of Wolverine in the past sixty days. After investigating, the group learn that the supposed sightings of Wolverine have actually been Albert, an android modeled in Wolverine's likeness.

== Powers and abilities ==
Misty Knight is a highly skilled combatant who, in addition to her police-combat training, is proficient in martial arts and possesses near-perfect aim with firearms. She is a superb detective, having graduated at the top of her class at the police academy and earned a degree in criminology from the John Jay College of Criminal Justice. Her bionic arm is superhumanly strong, and she can punch a target with incredible force, or crush objects as tough as steel in her vise-like grip. Since the rest of her body is not cybernetically enhanced, she cannot lift objects heavier than her back, shoulders, and legs can physically support. Her arm's advantages as a weapon are limited to kinetic crushing and impact forces.

Her original bionic arm was constructed from steel, and designed by Stark International. Her new arm was built by Stark Industries and is an alloy of Antarctic vibranium and diamond; at close range it can liquefy all known metals, including adamantium. The arm can generate a wide anti-gravity repulsor field similar to Iron Man's armor. It can apparently release a concentrated beam of cryogenic energy, which can cover a target in a blanket of ice from a distance. This cold seems to make the target much more fragile, allowing otherwise durable materials to be broken or rended when frozen. Iron Man revealed the arm also displays technopathic capabilities, teaching Misty how to control a horde of robots. Following her "pregnancy", Danny Rand spent money on additional features to the arm, including magnetism and a concussive blast.

A couple of new upgrades given to her bionics were shown during her hunt across the world for Wolverine. Showcasing an energy shield to ward off incoming assaults with, a force field which she can expand over a marginal radius to help protect multiple people if need be. It even has a deployed grapple line within the forearm for use as an extension to reach and grab objects a good distance away. The grapple is useful for latching onto and swinging from place to place with or to escape deadly falls from great heights.

== Reception ==
=== Critical response ===
Deirdre Kaye of Scary Mommy called Misty Knight a "role model" and a "truly heroic" female character. Rosie Knight of Nerdist included Misty Knight in their "8 Awesome Women Detectives in Comics" list. John Wilson of WhatCulture ranked Misty Knight 4th in their "10 Best Comic Book Detectives (That Aren't Batman)" list. Angelo Delos Trinos of Comic Book Resources ranked Misty Knight 9th in their "10 Most Iconic Black Marvel Superheroes" list, writing, "Misty became a cult favorite among fans. Misty's rise to prominence continues to this day, and she has nowhere else to go but up." Jason Serafino of Complex ranked Misty Knight 14th in their "25 Most Memorable Black Comic Book Characters" list, saying, "Misty is a refreshing figure for all readers to look up to. She's never over sexualized, and never gimmicky. Sadly, that's rare in the superhero genre."

=== Cultural impact and legacy ===
First appearing in 1975, Misty Knight was one of the first Black comic book characters to play either a major or supporting role in the big two comic book houses, Marvel Comics and DC Comics. She was the first Black female superhero for Marvel. DC had previously introduced Nubia, a supporting character for Wonder Woman, in 1973. In Marvel Comics, preceding characters were Gabe Jones (debuted in 1963), Black Panther (1966), Bill Foster (1966), Spider-Man supporting characters Joe Robertson (1967), his son Randy Robertson (1968), Hobie Brown (the Prowler) and Falcon (both 1969), Luke Cage (1972), Blade (1973), and Abe Brown (1974). In DC Comics, she was preceded by Teen Titans member Mal Duncan who debuted in 1970, Green Lantern wielder John Stewart (1971), and Mister Miracle protégé Shilo Norman (1973).

Misty Knight and Iron Fist had the first interracial kiss between super heroes in mainstream comics in 1977.

A character known as Misty Knight appears in Quentin Tarantino's short film My Best Friend's Birthday and is named after the Marvel character.

== In other media ==
=== Television ===
Simone Missick as Misty Knight in the television series Luke Cage.

- Misty Knight appears in The Super Hero Squad Show episode "A Brat Walks Among Us!," voiced by Tamera Mowry. This version is a member of the Heroes for Hire.
- Misty Knight appears in the Netflix series set in the Marvel Cinematic Universe, portrayed by Simone Missick. This version is a detective at the NYPD's 29th Precinct in Harlem, known by her colleagues for her tendency to visualize crime scenes through viewing photos.
  - First appearing in the first season of Luke Cage, she is partnered with Detective Rafael Scarfe, though she is unaware that he is secretly working for Cornell "Cottonmouth" Stokes. As the season progresses, she attempts to expose Cottonmouth's crimes, along with those of Willis "Diamondback" Stryker, Shades, and councilwoman Mariah Dillard as well as investigating Luke Cage's connection to them. After Scarfe is killed trying to extort Cottonmouth, Knight is reassigned to work under Inspector Priscilla Ridley. At the end of the season, Knight goes undercover at the Harlem's Paradise nightclub to spy on Dillard and Shades.
  - Knight appears in The Defenders. As of this series, she has been promoted to a citywide task force investigating crimes committed by the Hand and joins forces with Cage, Jessica Jones, Matt Murdock, Danny Rand, Colleen Wing, and Claire Temple to protect their loved ones and defeat the Hand. While Knight loses an arm to Bakuto in the process, she learns Rand arranged for her to receive a bionic prosthetic while recovering in the hospital.
  - As of the second season of Luke Cage, set after the events of The Defenders, Knight is still in therapy while adjusting to life without her arm amidst mockery from her coworkers and criminals alike, especially her rival Detective Nandi Tyler. After receiving advice from Wing, Knight agrees to be outfitted with the Rand Enterprises prosthetic arm before resuming her investigation into Dillard and Shades' criminal activities as well as Bushmaster's attacks on the pair.
  - Knight also appears in the second season of Iron Fist.

=== Video games ===
- Misty Knight appears as an assist character in Marvel Heroes, voiced by Cynthia McWilliams.
- Misty Knight appears as an unlockable playable character in Marvel Avengers Alliance.
- Misty Knight appears in Marvel Puzzle Quest.
- Misty Knight appears in Marvel Contest of Champions.
- Misty Knight appears as an unlockable playable character in Marvel Future Fight.
- Misty Knight appears as an unlockable playable character in Marvel Avengers Academy, voiced by Cenophia Mitchell. This version is a member of the Defenders.
- Misty Knight appears as an unlockable playable character in Lego Marvel Super Heroes 2.
- Misty Knight appears in Marvel Strike Force.
- Misty Knight appears in Marvel Snap.
