= Humbug (character) =

American comic book character

- Humbug as depicted in Heroes for Hire (vol. 2) #11 (August 2007). Art by Clayton Henry.

Publication information
- Publisher: Marvel Comics
- First appearance: Web of Spider-Man #19 (October 1986)
- Created by: David Michelinie; Marc Silvestri

In-story information
- Alter ego: Buck Mitty
- Species: Human mutate
- Team affiliations: Heroes for Hire; Empire State University
- Abilities: Superhuman strength, speed, agility and senses Use of some audio tapes and a series of amplifiers Ability to communicate with all insectoids on a planetary scale

Humbug (Buck Mitty) is a fictional character appearing in American comic books published by Marvel Comics. Humbug was originally a supervillain but later became a superhero and a member of the Heroes for Hire.

== Publication history ==
Humbug first appeared in Web of Spider-Man #19 (Oct 1986).

== Fictional character biography ==
Humbug's debut appearance in Web of Spider-Man #19 (October 1986). Art by M. D. Bright (penciler) and Josef Rubinstein (inker).

Buck Mitty was a senior entomology professor at Empire State University until his funding was cut off. Desperate to prove the value of insects, as well as to gain enough wealth to continue his research, Mitty becomes the criminal Humbug to achieve his goals by whatever means necessary.

Humbug intends to steal a shipment of black pearls, but a group of criminals beat him to the punch, and he flees when Spider-Man appears. He next targets an armored car carrying money, but is stopped by Spider-Man, who destroys his equipment.

Humbug is imprisoned, but is later released after his sentence is commuted. He renews his criminal activity, now dedicated to punishing ESU for their betrayal. In the one-shot special "Spider-Man: Bug Stops Here", Humbug attacks the New York Museum of Natural History to finance his research by stealing a rare scarab amulet. Spider-Man confronts Humbug and leads him to a place of the museum that was damaged by termites, causing him to fall and land on a lower floor.

Discovering that Humbug had renewed his attack on the museum, Deadpool is hired by unknown parties to prevent it. Deadpool catches up with Humbug, but one of Humbug's insect allies warns him of the attack. Humbug fires sonic blasts at Deadpool, rendering him deaf and mute. Enraged, Deadpool attacks Humbug, dousing him with honey before pouring a jar of fire ants on him. The ants devour Humbug, who Deadpool believes to have been killed.

While the outer layer of Humbug's skin was eaten by the ants, he made a deal with them that allowed him to live. Rodney, the leader of the ants, stayed with Humbug after this.

=== Heroes for Hire ===
Following the events of "Civil War", Humbug reforms and joins Heroes for Hire. He is apparently eaten by giant insects while on a mission in Antarctica, but survives and gains new powers. His personality changes, however, as he becomes obsessed with serving Earth's insects. He is advised by the insects that they must return to New York for the Hulk and his Warbound are fast approaching. In the World War Hulk series, Humbug turns on Earth's hive and the Heroes for Hire to serve the Brood queen of Hulk's Warbound, No-Name. No-Name uses him as a host for her gestating eggs.

It was later revealed that Earth's hive knew that Humbug would turn on them and used him to transport their own agents into the queen's hive. These agents then shot the queen with a beam, claiming to have sterilized her. When the queen gloated that her hivelings were near hatching inside of Humbug, the Earth-hive agents reveal that Humbug had been poisoned beforehand, dooming both him and the queen's eggs. Having been mutated into an insect-like form, Humbug begs Shang-Chi to kill him, to which he complies.

== Powers and abilities ==
Humbug uses some audio tapes and a series of amplifiers to broadcast the noises of various insect species, which can incapacitate others or damage materials. In Deadpool, Humbug is revealed to be able to communicate with insects.

Following Heroes for Hire #9, Humbug received a massive increase in his powers, gaining superhuman strength, speed, and senses.
