= List of Luke Cage and Iron Fist supporting characters =

This is a list of supporting characters of Power Man (Luke Cage) and Iron Fist (Danny Rand), along with their successors Power Man (Victor Alvarez) and Iron Fist (Lin Lie), appearing in American comic books published by Marvel Comics.

== Family ==
=== Luke Cage's family ===
- Esther Lucas - Esther Lucas is the wife of James Lucas and the mother of James Lucas Jr. and Carl, the latter of whom would grow up to become Luke Cage. Despite loving Carl, she and her husband were also disappointed in his continuous run ins with the law and were embarrassed about having to bail him out. Esther was killed by one of Carl's gang members causing James and James Jr. to blame him.
- James Lucas - The father of Luke Cage.
- Jessica Jones – Wife and partner of Luke Cage.
- Danielle "Dani" Cage – The daughter of Luke Cage and Jessica Jones.

=== Danny Rand's family ===
- Heather Rand - The mother of Danny Rand. Wendell, Heather's husband, convinced her to bring Danny on their trip to the Himalayas. While there Wendell's business partner, Harold Meachum, kills Wendell claiming that he did it out of his love for Heather. Heather was sickened by his actions and was left for dead with Danny. While the two continued to venture towards K'un-L'un, they were attacked by a wolf pack with one of the wolves later becoming Ferocia. With nothing left to lose, Heather threw herself at the pack to save Danny giving up her life in the process.
- Wendell Rand - Wendell Rand was previously a student of Lei Kung in K'un-L'un. After returning to the United States, Wendell married Heather Duncan who would bear him a son, Danny. When Danny turned ten, Wendell decided it was time to return to K'un-L'un. During the trip, Harold Meachum allowed Wendell to fall to his death and abandoned Heather and Danny when Heather refused to return his affections.
- Miranda Rand - Miranda Rand is the daughter of Wendell Rand and K'un-L'un native Shakirah. Shakirah was soon murdered and Wendell fled leaving Miranda an orphan. She was soon trained by Conal D'Hu-Tsien, who was in love with her. They encountered Danny Rand, who had taken the name Iron Fist, and aided him in battling Merrin. When they discovered that Miranda was a woman both she and Conal were put on trial as it was against the law to train women in martial arts. Danny tried to save them, but he was unsuccessful. Before being taken away, Miranda revealed to Danny that she was his sister.
- Pei - Danny Rand's protégé and ward.

=== Victor Alvarez's family ===
- Reina Alvarez: Reina Alvarez is the mother of Victor, the new Power Man, and the estranged widow of Shades, a former enemy of Luke Cage. Reina is unaware of her son's activities as Power Man but his frequent absences during the night, mysterious injuries and poor excuses cause her to believe he is involved with gang activity. As part of Power Man's condition to accept Iron Fist's offer to train him, the Rand Corporation "hires" Victor as a community organizer (which is a front for his new partnership with Iron Fist) and gives him a steady income, allowing him and his mother to move out of his uncle's home. Reina becomes relieved of Victor's new responsibilities and new direction in his future, which reconciles them.
- Ignacio Alvarez: Victor's uncle and Reina's brother, who allows the two to live with him and his family.
- Sofia "Sophie" Alvarez: Victor's cousin and Ignacio's daughter, who knows his identity as Power Man. When the Hand uncover Victor's identity, they use Sophie as a hostage but he is able to rescue her with Iron Fist's help.

=== Lin Lie's family ===
- Professor Lin - The archeologist father of Lin Lie and Lin Feng who went missing while excavating the tomb of Chiyou.

== Allies ==
=== Luke Cage's allies ===
- Noah Burstein – The scientist who gave Luke Cage his powers.
- Reva Connors - She was friends with, and eventually started dating, Carl Lucas the man who would eventually become Luke Cage. Cage's former friend, Willis Stryker, was jealous of their romance and framed Cage with stolen drugs. When the Maggia came after Stryker, they inadvertently killed Connors.
- David "D.W." Griffith – A theater owner and friend of Luke Cage.
- Claire Temple – Doctor and friend of Luke Cage.

=== Danny Rand's allies ===
- Fooh – An exiled K'un-L'un elder and engineer.
- Jeryn Hogarth – Attorney and friend of Iron Fist's father.
- Misty Knight – A former police officer turned private investigator, Colleen Wing's partner and Danny Rand's love interest.
- Lei Kung – Taught martial arts to Iron Fist.
- Joy Meachum – Blamed Iron Fist for the death of her father, and later became an ally of his.
- Rafael Scarfe – A police officer and Misty Knight's former partner who becomes an ally of Iron Fist and later Luke Cage.
- Colleen Wing – Misty Knight's partner and ally of Danny Rand.
- Lee Wing – Colleen's father and a professor of Asian history.
- Sparrow – Childhood friend and adopted daughter of Lei Kung who succeeded her father as both the Thunderer and Yu-Ti.
- Yu-Ti – Immortal lord of K'un-L'un.

=== Power Man and Iron Fist's allies ===
- Daughters of the Dragon – The duo of Misty Knight and Colleen Wing.
- El Águila – A mutant swashbuckler and costumed crime fighter, who was originally an antagonist for the Heroes for Hire until he became an ally of theirs.
- Jennifer "Jenny" Royce – Secretary for the Heroes for Hire.
- Sons of the Tiger – A group of martial artists consisting of Lin Sun, Abe Brown, Bob Diamond and Lotus Shinjuko.

=== Victor Alvarez's allies ===
- Max Brashear – Scientist son of Blue Marvel who befriends Victor during their tenure under Sunspot's Avengers.
- Tiowa Bryant – Victor Alvarez's high school classmate and briefly his girlfriend.

=== Lin Lie's allies ===
- Ji Shuangshuang – A descendant of Nü-wa and leader of the Nü-wa who reveals Lie's lineage and history of his Sword of Fu Xi to him. She wields the Bands of Nü-wa, a pair of gauntlets that generate a mystical blue mist, which can be shape itself into hard constructs, project as blasts, and allow Shuangshaung to fly.
- Ah Cheng – Lin Lie's best friend and roommate, who helps him in his early days as Sword Master.
- Mei Min – A K'un-L'un native who hosts Lin Lie at her family's home and helps him recover the shards of his broken Sword of Fu Xi.
- Yang Yi – Lin Lie's rival turned friend from K'un-L'un.

== Enemies ==
=== Luke Cage's enemies ===
- Baron - A knight-themed crime leader who uses ancient weapons modified with advanced technology.
- Big Brother - A crime leader who increases his strength with a special exo-skeleton.
- Black Mariah – Criminal who uses her size against her enemies.
- Bushmaster – Crime boss who gained the same powers as Luke Cage, and can absorb energies from other people.
- Cheshire Cat – Villain with the ability to become invisible and intangible.
- Coldfire - James Lucas, Jr. was born and raised in Harlem, New York and lived in an apartment block with mother, father, and younger brother. As he grew up he started to hate his criminal brother and believed that he brought shame upon the family. His father James had to keep bailing Carl out of prison. He even blamed his brother Carl Lucas, who would later become Luke Cage, for the death of their mother. When Carl went to prison, James and his father moved around the country trying to keep him away from Carl. The pair did not even know each other was still alive. James Jr. was unable to fight Cage and decided to gain superpowers of his own through a mutagenic process devised by Karl Malus. His body was altered, causing his body to be engulfed in fire without harming him.
- Comanche – Criminal is an Indian-themed villain was once in the same gang as Luke Cage. Ward Meachum later provided him with a bow and trick arrows.
- Cottonmouth – A drug kingpin who gained the same powers as Luke Cage.
- Diamondback – Childhood friend and later enemy of Luke Cage.
- Discus – A villain who wields a throwing disc.
- Big Ben Donovan – A lawyer who represents supervillains.
- Goldbug – Supervillain who used gold-themed paraphernalia.
- Cockroach Hamilton – Criminal enforcer and a skilled marksman.
- Piranha Jones – Criminal with sharpened steel spikes for teeth.
- Lionfang - A teacher and circus worker who wears a special helmet that enables him to gain the strength, agility and fierceness of any animal. Although he was thought to have been killed by Scourge of the Underworld, he turned up alive but in a wheelchair.
- Gideon Mace – Dishonorably discharged Army colonel whose right hand was replaced by a spiked mace.
- Maggia - An international crime syndicate.
- Mangler - A professional wrestler.
- Mr. Fish – Supervillain with a fish-like appearance.
- Albert Rackham - Albert Rackham was a prison guard at Seagate Prison. He was a racist abusive man who took particular interest in Carl Lucas. He attempted to kill Lucas when he volunteered for Noah Burstein's experiment, unintentionally giving him superpowers. After Lucas escaped, Rackham continued to work at Seagate, where he abused Comanche and Shades. Rackham later lost his job at Seagate and tried looking for new employment. Cage teams up with Shades and Comanche, who are seeking revenge on Rackham. After finding Rackham, they end up in a battle with Stiletto. In the confusion, Rackham is hit and killed by an ambulance.
- Señor Muerte / Señor Suerte – Criminal thieves and assassins.
- Shades – A sunglasses-wearing criminal who was once in the same gang as Luke Cage. Ward Meachum later provided Shades with sunglasses that shot lasers.
- Spear – A criminal and brother of Mangler who uses a unique speargun.
- Stiletto – Brother of Discus, wields knives and shoots blades from wrist devices.
- Wildfire - Harold Paprika is a racist who wields a flamethrower.
- X the Marvel - A former professional wrestler who was enhanced by the Super-Soldier Serum.
- Zzzax - A supervillain made from pure electricity.

=== Danny Rand's enemies ===
- Ferocia – A K'un-L'un wolf who was magically uplifted into a humanoid form by Master Khan.
- Golden Tigers - An important and feared martial arts gang operating in Chinatown.
  - Chaka Khan - Robert Hao was the original crime lord of the Golden Tigers. He was defeated by Iron Fist, Misty Knight, and Coleen Wing and arrested.
  - Chaka – Thomas Arn is a former judo instructor and the current crime lord of the Golden Tigers and an enemy of Iron Fist.
  - Chen-Wu - A member of the Golden Tigers who worked for Chaka Khan.
  - Chin-Lee
  - Kwai Chang - A member of the Golden Tigers who worked for Chaka Khan.
  - Teng - A member of the Golden Tigers who worked for Chaka Khan.
  - Tommy
- Master Khan
- Harold Meachum – Business partner of Wendell Rand, who betrayed him and left Danny orphaned.
- Ward Meachum – Blamed Iron Fist for the death of Harold Meachum and tried to have him killed.
- Junzo Muto - A leader of the Hand who stole the Iron Fist from Danny Rand.
- Ninja – An unnamed ninja servant of Master Khan whose soul was sealed away by Lei Kung and Yu-Ti when he attempted to destroy K'un-L'un for his master. He possessed Professor Wing until he was forced out of his body by Iron Fist and Colleen Wing.
- Sabretooth – He clashed with Iron Fist and the Heroes for Hire several times along with his occasional partner Constrictor before becoming a major antagonist of the X-Men, particularly with Wolverine.
- Scimitar – A master of bladed weapons.
- Scythe - An assassin hired by Harold Meachum to kill Iron Fist. Scythe was a talented martial artist whose name came from his use of a kusari-gama as his primary weapon. The Japanese weapon consists of a sickle connected to a weight by a long chain. He managed to choke Iron Fist with the chain of his weapon, but the hero summoned his chi and shattered Scythe's weapon. Unable to conceive the power of the Iron Fist, Scythe collapsed giving up Meachum's name. He was never seen again afterwards.
- Steel Serpent – Rival of Iron Fist.
- Brenda Swanson – Harold Meachum's illegitimate daughter and Joy Meachum's half sister who desired revenge against Danny Rand for her father's death.
- Triple-Iron – A bodyguard hired by Harold Meachum to protect him from Iron Fist.
- Warhawk – A racist war veteran who gained superhuman strength and durability from an experiment but also drove him insane.

=== Power Man and Iron Fist's enemies ===
- Chemistro – Three villains who used alchemy powers to transmute matter.
- Eel – Supervillain who uses a costume with a variety of abilities.
- Firebolt
- High Priest of Zor
- Impasse – Impasse is a hitman with the ability to infect people with a deadly toxin.
- Montenegro – An expert mountain climber and uses spiked boots, a grappling hook, a device which can fire pitons into solid rock, and a gun which can spray freezing vapor.
- Reaper (Louis Dawson)

=== Victor Alvarez's enemies ===
- Flashmob

=== Lin Lie's enemies ===
- Chiyou – A god of war who was sealed away by the Yellow Emperor and the tribes of the Three Sovereigns in ancient times. In the present day his seals become weakened, allowing his influence to manifest and his demonic forces to be released, and seeks to have his seals destroyed to fully resurrect him.
- Lin Feng – Lin Lie's older brother and worshipper of Chiyou.
- Shui Sisters – Demonic sisters and servants of Chiyou.
