= Harold Meachum =

- Harold Meachum as depicted in Marvel Premiere #18 (July 1974). Art by Larry Hama (penciller), Dick Giordano (inker), and Petra Goldberg (colorist).

Publication information
- Publisher: Marvel Comics
- First appearance: Marvel Premiere #15 (May, 1974)
- Created by: Roy Thomas (writer); Gil Kane (artist)

In-story information
- Species: Human

Harold "Harry" Meachum is a fictional character appearing in American comic books published by Marvel Comics. The character is depicted as a sinister businessman, primarily a foe of Iron Fist. In his original appearances in comics, he is depicted as the father of Joy Meachum and the brother of Ward Meachum.

In the first season of the Marvel Cinematic Universe series Iron Fist, Harold was the father of both Joy and Ward and was portrayed by David Wenham.

== Publication history ==
Harold Meachum first appeared in Marvel Premiere #15 and was created by Roy Thomas and Gil Kane.

Meachum has appeared in 36 issues total, most recently in 2018.

== Fictional character biography ==
Harold Meachum was the business partner of Wendell Rand, father of Daniel (who would later become Iron Fist). While traveling with Rand and his family to uncover what would be a major discovery in business, Harold came across K'un-L'un, a stronghold of a colony of humanoid aliens whose spaceship crashed in a pocket dimension that intersects with Earth.

After leaving Wendell Rand, Harold begins traveling back to civilization, only to be lost in the wilderness. After being found by a woman and some sherpas, Harold has his legs amputated due to frostbite. Around the same time, Danny Rand's parents fall to their deaths while traveling up a mountain. Danny is taken in by the inhabitants of K'un-L'un. Harold spends the next ten years preparing to kill Danny, instating a $10,000 contract for Danny's death or capture.

When Iron Fist confronts Harold Meachum, he takes pity on him and spares his life. However, Harold is killed by a ninja working for Master Khan. Harold's daughter Joy assumes that Iron Fist had killed him, and his brother Ward Meachum starts planning revenge on Iron Fist.

== In other media ==
Harold Meachum appears in the first season of Iron Fist, portrayed by David Wenham. This version is the father of Ward Meachum. In 2004, he died of cancer, but was revived to serve The Hand while they use Rand Enterprises for their own goals. After Danny Rand drives the Hand out of Rand Enterprises, he learns that Harold was involved in the death of his parents. While battling Rand, Harold falls from the roof of the company's corporate tower to his death. Rand and Ward have his body cremated.
