= List of Marvel Comics characters: M =

== M-11 ==
Originally known as the Human Robot, M-11 was renamed in the 2006 to 2007 Agents of Atlas miniseries as an allusion to its first appearance in Menace #11 from Atlas Comics (Marvel Comics' 1950s predecessor). In an alternate reality from mainstream Earth, a scientist's newly created robot is programmed by the scientist's greedy business manager to murder the scientist. The incomplete robot, however, continues through with his directive to "kill the man in the room", and kills the business manager when the man enters. The robot then leaves the house, programmed to "kill the man in the room", but falls off a pier into the sea and short-circuits.

=== M-11 in other media ===
M-11 appears in Lego Marvel Super Heroes 2 via the "Agents of Atlas" DLC pack.

== Maa-Gor ==
Maa-Gor is a member of a tribe of Man-Apes from Savage Land. After losing a battle with Ka-Zar, he walks into the mystic mist surrounding the Savage Land, which transform him into a superhuman with increased intelligence, and he renames himself Man-God. Later, he returns to the mist and encounters an alien machine which he realize is responsible for his powers. The machine then split him into two; a blue logic part and a red emotional part. The blue is killed by the red, but the machine interacts and fuse them again, turning him into his old Man-Ape self.

The origin of Maa-Gor's unrelenting thirst for revenge, and insane hatred and rivalry toward Ka-Zar, stems from Ka-Zar's saber-toothed tiger companion, "Zabu's raking talons", taking Maa-Gor's left eye. During the incident, Maa-Gor and his tribe murdered Lord Robert Plunder, the English nobleman who discovered the Savage Land, which was witnessed by Ka-Zar (Kevin Plunder), his son, while the Hidden Jungle Lord was still a young boy. As an adult, Ka-Zar kills Maa-Gor's tribe by initiating a rockslide, leaving Maa-Gor the sole surviving Man-Ape.

== Mad Jim Jaspers ==
Sir James "Mad Jim" Jaspers is a character in American comic books seen in Marvel Comics. He was created by David Thorpe and Alan Davis for Marvel UK. He is a powerful supervillain who was the archenemy of Captain Britain and Excalibur as well as a few other heroes and is also the main antagonist of the Excalibur series.

In the reality of Earth-238, James Jaspers, a British politician and mutant with powerful reality-warping abilities, uses the robot Fury and an advanced technologically equipped military task force, known as the Status Crew to eliminate mutants and super-powered beings. Unmatched in power by any other being, with any potential threats destroyed by Fury, Jaspers adopts the persona of Mad Jim Jaspers, a bank robber and crook paying homage to the Mad Hatter. It was around this time that the Omniversal Guardian Merlyn, became aware of not just this reality's version of Jaspers' danger to the multiverse but the Jim Jaspers of the Earth-616 reality, who Merlyn realized possessed even greater powers. Merlyn teleports one of the few remaining superheroes of Earth-238, Linda McQuillan, to Earth-616.

The Jaspers of Earth-616 wins a landslide general election victory on an anti-superhero platform and becomes Prime Minister of Britain. Events begins to mirror those of Earth-238 as Jaspers unleashes the force of the Jaspers Warp upon London, causing much chaos and devastation. However, Jaspers is attacked by a reality-hopping Fury, who teleports him outside the universe. There, he would have no reality to control and thus be rendered powerless.

== Madame Monstrosity ==
Madame Monstrosity (Melodia Stillwell) is a geneticist and mother of Farley Stillwell, Harlan Stillwell, and Shannon Stillwell who created the animal-like Humanimals by splicing human test subjects with animal test subjects using a special chamber. Her "Farm" is located somewhere in Westchester County, New York. Additionally, she claims that her work was used to create Lizard, Morbius, and Rhino.

Two of her test subjects included the children Bailey Briggs and Eli Hartman, who she respectively transformed into a spider and elephant/rhinoceros hybrid. After Bailey escapes her captivity, she attempts to recapture him and creates a clone of him named Boy-Spider. In a flashback, it is revealed that Madame Monstrosity was an acquaintance of the High Evolutionary, who was not impressed with her experiments. Madame Monstrosity transforms herself into a chimeric form to battle Spider-Boy, only for her Humanimals to rebel against her. Madame Monstrosity is saved by the High Evolutionary who plans to experiment on her, as he was impressed with her transformation.

== Madame Sanctity ==
Madame Sanctity (Tanya Trask) is a character appearing in American comic books published by Marvel Comics. The character was created by Scott Lobdell, Jeph Loeb and Gene Ha. She first appeared in Askani'Son #1 (January 1996), though her true identity was revealed in Uncanny X-Men #-1 (July 1997).

She is a member of the Askani and as such, her story ties into that of Rachel Summers and Cable. Madame Sanctity was originally Tanya Trask, daughter of the Sentinels' creator Bolivar Trask. Like her brother Larry Trask, Tanya was a mutant, though she possessed time travelling powers, as well as telepathic and psychokinetic abilities. When these manifested, Tanya was lost in the timestream, until being pulled into the Askani future by Rachel. Tanya became a member of Rachel's Askani Sisterhood and took on the alias Sanctity.

== Artie Maddicks ==
Arthur "Artie" Maddicks is a character appearing in American comic books published by Marvel Comics. He first appeared in X-Factor #2 (March 1986), and was created by Bob Layton and Jackson Guice.

The mutant son of Carl Maddicks, Artie's mutation gives him a lumpy pink form with no nose and renders him mute. In addition, he is able to project mental holograms, which he uses to communicate. As a ward of X-Factor, Artie is a member of the "X-Terminators".

When X-Factor splits their wards between two boarding schools, Artie attends St. Simons. During "Inferno", Artie is abducted by the demon N'Astirh. Before he is rescued, Artie witnesses at least two murders. After helping to foil a mutant kidnapping plot, Artie gains an unofficial grandmother in Ida Fassbender, a nervous but kindly woman who lives near St. Simons. Artie later became a ward of the Massachusetts Academy, then the Future Foundation.

=== Artie Maddicks in other media ===
- Artie Maddicks appears in the X-Men: The Animated Series series finale "Graduation Day".
- Artie Maddicks appears in X2, portrayed by Bryce Hodgson. This version is a student at Xavier's school.
- Artie Maddicks appears in the Wolverine and the X-Men episode "Future X" as a prisoner in a mutant camp in the future.
- Artie Maddicks makes a non-speaking appearance in the X-Men '97 episode "A Force to Be Reckoned With".

== Madness ==
Madness (Corwin Jones) is a character appearing in American comic books published by Marvel Comics. The character was created by Sabir Pirzada and Francesco Mortarino; Corwin Jones first appeared in Cult of Carnage: Misery #1 (July 2023) and the Madness Symbiote first appeared in Cult of Carnage: Misery #2 (August 2023).

Corwin Jones is a war veteran who was discharged from the military where he contracted an unknown illness. After a brief work as a Guardsman at Alchemax, he was contracted by Carlton Drake of the Life Foundation to steal the Symbiote samples of Phage, Riot, Scream, Agony, Lasher, and Toxin from Alchemax. Drake had Corwin merge with the Symbiote samples, combining the symbiotes into a gestalt symbiote called Madness.

== Magique ==
- First appearance: The X-Men #107 (October 1977)
- Created by: Chris Claremont and Dave Cockrum
- Species: Shi'ar
- Teams: Imperial Guard
- Abilities: Ability to create realistic illusions
- Aliases: Magic

Magique, originally known as Magic, is a Shi'ar warrior and member of the Imperial Guard. The character, created by Chris Claremont and Dave Cockrum, first appeared in The Uncanny X-Men #107 (October 1977). Magique has the ability to create realistic illusions. Like many original members of the Imperial Guard, Magique is the analog of a character from DC Comics' Legion of Super-Heroes: in her case Princess Projectra.

In the "War of Kings" event, Magique is part of the Imperial Guard faction that attacks Ronan the Accuser on his wedding day. The Guard also slaughters many new Nova Corps recruits. Magique leads a squad of Imperial Guards to Knowhere, base of the Guardians, tracking Adam Warlock. However, Warlock has begun turning into his dark counterpart, the Magus, and tricks Magique's troops into killing her.

Some years later, she is replaced by a member of the Subguardians in Guardians of the Galaxy (vol. 5) #1.

== Magma ==
Magma is the name of two characters appearing in American comic books published by Marvel Comics.

== Moses Magnum ==
- Further reading: Moses Magnum at the Comic Book DB (archived from the original)

Moses Magnum is a character appearing in American comic books published by Marvel Comics. A supervillain who first appeared in Giant-Size Spider-Man #4 (April 1975), he was created by Gerry Conway and Ross Andru. He is an arms dealer and terrorist.

Magnum was born in Ethiopia, but sided with Benito Mussolini's occupying army against his own people. Magnum later became a naturalized American citizen. He became president of the Deterrence Research Corporation (DRC), the world's foremost independent weapons manufacturing firm. As an arms expert, Magnum battled Spider-Man and the Punisher. Magnum surprisingly survived after the Punisher exposed him to chemical weapons. Then, he seemingly fell to his death after a battle with Luke Cage. However, Magnum was rescued by Apocalypse and granted superhuman powers which Magnum dubbed his "Magnum Force". His powers include superhuman strength and geologically based powers to cause earthquakes and sense disruptions in the Earth.

Re-establishing his company as Magnum Munitions, Magnum purchases classified Deathlok cyborg technology from Cybertek. After the criminal High-Tech stole the technology, Magnum sent one of his agents in a massive Terrordome weapons platform to retrieve it, but was thwarted by Deathlok. Magnum subsequently bid against rival weapons manufacturers A.I.M. for a defense contract, destroying their world headquarters after they refused to withdraw their bid. Magnum used the subsequent profits to outfit a new army, conquering the African nation Canaan and seeking to restructure it into a homeland for African-Americans. Magnum then sought to ensure Canaan's economic independence by invading neighboring Wakanda, but Wakanda's king, Black Panther, foils the invasion with Deathlok's aid.

Moses Magnum's body generates seismic force which amplifies his natural strength, gives him an unknown degree of durability and attunes him to seismic vibrations. He can unleash this energy to cause vibratory shockwaves, minor tremors or devastating earthquakes. These waves will emanate from his body in all directions unless he purposefully tries to channel them in a single direction, usually along the length of his arms and through the tips of his fingers.

=== Moses Magnum in other media ===
Moses Magnum appears in the Iron Man: Armored Adventures episode "Panther's Prey". This version is a mercenary who lacks powers and killed T'Chaka as part of a coup.

== Magnus the Sorcerer ==
Magnus the Sorcerer is a character appearing in American comic books published by Marvel Comics. He first appeared in Spider-Woman #2 (May 1978), and was created by Marv Wolfman and Carmine Infantino. He is the mentor of Jessica Drew / Spider-Woman. Magnus grew up in the 6th century AD, in the time of King Arthur. Turned down as an apprentice by Merlin, he became the student, and eventually lover, of Morgan le Fay. In the 20th century, the centuries-old sorcerer could possess the bodies of the living. Magnus' spirit took possession of Jonathan Drew and aided the High Evolutionary in organizing the Knights of Wundagore.

== Maha Yogi ==
Maha Yogi

Publication information
- Publisher: Marvel Comics
- First appearance: Journey into Mystery #96 (September 1963)
- Created by: Stan Lee (writer); Jack Kirby (artist)

In-story information
- Notable aliases: Mad Merlin, The Warlock, the Maha Yogi

Maha Yogi is a character in the Marvel Universe. He first appeared in Journey into Mystery #96 (September 1963), and was created by Stan Lee and Jack Kirby.

Yogi was apparently born 10,000 years ago in what is now Central Europe. He apparently was a savage that came to possess some portion of the same Bloodgem that Ulysses Bloodstone would later possess, which gave him immortality and eternal youth. He later came to Britain during the time of Camelot, and impersonated the real Merlin while he was away. The Eternal Sersi exposed the impostor, and the real Merlin placed him in suspended animation. Yogi was revived in modern times, still posing as Merlin, and battled and was defeated by Thor.

As a result of mutation induced by the Caretakers of Arcturus, Maha Yogi had the psionic abilities to control the minds of others, create illusions, project psionic force bolts, levitate objects as large as a building, teleport himself, create force fields and alter his own appearance. His psionic powers have a limited range. Thanks to his possession of a fragment of the Bloodstone, Maha Yogi is virtually immortal, and has a physically malleable body.

== Brett Mahoney ==
Brett Mahoney

Publication information
- Publisher: Marvel Comics
- First appearance: Marvel Comics Presents vol. 2 #1 (Nov. 2007)
- Created by: Marc Guggenheim; Dave Wilkins

In-story information
- Species: Human
- Team affiliations: NYPD
- Partnerships: Stacy Dolan
- Supporting character of: X-Men; Daredevil

Detective Brett Mahoney is a police detective and the partner of Stacy Dolan. In his first appearance they were investigating the death of a John Doe. The only clue they had was from a witness who described an unusual being later identified by Reed Richards as Uatu the Watcher. After learning that the John Doe is an extraterrestrial and that deceased spy Yelena Belova are somehow involved, Mahoney and Dolan later discover that the crime is related to a Muslim named Jaafar Yoosuf who Dolan arrested earlier for "buying" superpowers. They break into Yoosuf's apartment, but he is absent. When Dolan is accused of killing the John Doe, as evidenced by security footage showing her committing the crime, Mahoney simply tells her to remain silent as he is aware that something is wrong. Mahoney is visited by an escaped Dolan who fakes her death and leaves a book for him to read telling him the truth about what happened.

=== Brett Mahoney in other media ===
Brett Mahoney appears in media set in the Marvel Cinematic Universe (MCU), portrayed by Royce Johnson. This version is a police sergeant, later detective sergeant and chief of detectives, at the New York City Police Department's 15th Precinct and friendly rival of Foggy Nelson. Introduced in Daredevil, Mahoney later appears in Jessica Jones, The Punisher, and Daredevil: Born Again.

== Mainframe ==
Mainframe is the name of three characters appearing in American comic books published by Marvel Comics.

=== Earth-691 version ===
Mainframe

Publication information
- Publisher: Marvel Comics
- First appearance: Amazing Adventures #38 (September 1976) (cameo); Guardians of the Galaxy #5 (October 1990) (full appearance)
- Created by: Jim Valentino

In-story information
- Alter ego: Main Frame
- Species: Android
- Team affiliations: Guardians of the Galaxy (Earth-691)
- Notable aliases: Vision (Earth-691)
- Abilities: N/A

The Earth-691 version of Mainframe is a future counterpart of Vision that is featured in the title Guardians of the Galaxy. Mainframe is the chief operating system of an entire planet, and the guardian of the shield of hero Captain America. He soon joins the Guardians of the Galaxy spinoff, the Galactic Guardians.

=== Earth-982 version ===
Mainframe

Publication information
- Publisher: Marvel Comics
- First appearance: A-Next #1 (October 1998)
- Created by: Tom DeFalco; Ron Frenz

In-story information
- Alter ego: Mainframe
- Team affiliations: A-Next (Earth-982)
- Abilities: Superhuman strength, flight, energy blasts, projectile weaponry

The Earth-982 version of Mainframe appears when Iron Man decided to retire from the hero business. Iron Man did not want to let his legacy end, designed an android patterned after the Iron Man armor, and called this robotic warrior Mainframe. Mainframe was brought online when Trolls attacked the young boy Kevin Masterson. Mainframe assembled all of the reserve Avengers and fought to save Kevin. When the fight was over, Mainframe, Stinger, J2, and the new Thunderstrike formed A-Next, a new team of Avengers.

Right away, Mainframe attempted to establish himself as team leader. He frequently encountered resistance from Stinger who did not know that Mainframe was a robot. But when Mainframe was terminally damaged, exposing his secret, Stinger was one of the first to volunteer to shrink inside to repair him. They later learned that whenever Mainframe was severely injured, he would upload his personality and memories into a replacement body assembled on an orbiting satellite.

=== Earth-616 version ===
The Earth-616 Mainframe is an android who is a member of the Guardsman Alpha Squad. He is killed in battle against the zombie Squadron Supreme from the Marvel Zombies universe.

=== Mainframe in other media ===
- Mainframe, based on the Earth-982 incarnation, appears in Hulk and the Agents of S.M.A.S.H., voiced by Jeffrey Combs. This version is a gaming A.I. created by Iron Man that attained sentience. It battles the Agents of S.M.A.S.H., who convince it to surrender. Mainframe creates a new body modeled after Iron Man's armor and leaves to see the world.
- Mainframe, based on the Earth-691 incarnation, appears in films set in the Marvel Cinematic Universe (MCU). This version is a member of the Ravagers and a former member of Yondu Udonta's original team.
  - Mainframe makes a cameo appearance in a mid-credits scene in Guardians of the Galaxy Vol. 2, voiced by Miley Cyrus albeit uncredited. Following Yondu's death, she meets with Stakar Ogord, Martinex T'Naga, Charlie-27, Aleta Ogord, and Krugarr to reform their team in his memory.
  - Mainframe makes a cameo appearance in Guardians of the Galaxy Vol. 3, voiced by Tara Strong.

== Mainspring ==
Mainspring is a character appearing in American comic books published by Marvel Comics. The character, created by Louise Simonson and Pasqual Ferry, first appeared in Warlock vol. 5 #1 (August 1999). Mainspring is a human enhanced with a Techno-organic virus who is an enemy of Warlock and an ally of Bastion.

== Major Domo ==
Major Domo is a character appearing in American comic books published by Marvel Comics. He first appeared in Longshot #4 (September 1985), and was created by Ann Nocenti and Arthur Adams.

Major Domo is a Mojoverse android who is Mojo's personal assistant. He was first seen when Mojo gets word that Longshot and his fellow slaves have rebelled against Mojo.

=== Major Domo in other media ===
- Major Domo appears in the X-Men: The Animated Series episode "Mojovision", voiced by Jonathan Neville.
- Major Domo appears in Marvel's Deadpool VR, voiced by Jeffrey Combs.

== Major Liberty ==
Major Liberty is a character appearing in American comic books published by Marvel Comics. He first appeared in U.S.A. Comics #1–4.

John Liberty is a superhero who is empowered by the ghosts of America's past.

== Mako ==
Mako is the name of several characters appearing in American comic books published by Marvel Comics.

=== Atlantean version ===
Mako is an Atlantean and member of Attuma's barbarian horde. He worked with Gort in an attempt to capture Vision. Mako acted as the diversion so that Gort can use a sonic wave device on Vision.

=== Inventor version ===
An unidentified inventor went by the name of Mako and became the head of Project: Ultra-Tech.

=== First Line ally ===
Mako was a genetically engineered Atlantean/shark hybrid who was created by the scientist Vyrra and served Byrrah and Krang when Namor was missing in the 1960s.

=== Young Masters member ===
Mako is a member of the Young Masters and a test tube Atlantean made from the cell samples of Attuma, Orka, Tyrak, and U-Man, inheriting their respective powers.

== Malice ==
Malice is the name of several characters in Marvel Comics.

=== Black Panther villain ===
The first Malice was one of Killmonger's mutated allies during his vie for the throne of Wakanda.

=== Ghost Rider villain ===
The second villain to bear the name of Malice first appeared in Ghost Rider vol. 2 #25 (August 1977). A showboater by nature, Malice made sure that his emergence was well televised. He burned a wax museum and left a woman to die as well as robbing a bank with his Vault Puller, one of the many devices he used to terrorize the police. While his secret identity is not known, there are suggestions that Malice is a wealthy individual, as he drives an AC Cobra and refers to hiding the money in the woods on his "estate". He was arrested after being defeated by the Ghost Rider using an early predecessor to his penance stare.

=== Malice, the Mistress of Hate ===
Malice is a negative aspect of Susan Storm / Invisible Woman awakened at a time when she was emotionally devastated after suffering a miscarriage due to Psycho-Man. Malice retains the ability to create force fields, but uses the ability more aggressively, creating explosions and deadly spikes.

=== Anthropomorpho version ===
During the Infinity War when Adam Warlock's evil persona Magus attempted to conquer the universe, he used the alien species Anthropomorpho to create evil doppelgangers of Earth's heroes, including Invisible Woman. Invisible Woman defeats the doppelganger by absorbing it into her mind.

=== Marauder version ===
Malice

Publication information
- Publisher: Marvel Comics
- First appearance: Uncanny X-Men #210 (October 1986)
- Created by: Chris Claremont and Rick Leonardi

In-story information
- Alter ego: Alice MacAllister
- Team affiliations: Marauders
- Abilities: Possession

Malice is a member of Mister Sinister's Marauders. Being incorporeal, she has no physical body of her own and has to possess the body of others. Malice reappears in the Krakoan Age, where her name and backstory are revealed: she was originally Alice MacAllister, a teenager whose mutant abilities manifested during an argument with her mother. Malice is killed during a conflict with Betsy Braddock and Kwannon, but is resurrected by the Five and given a fresh chance at life.

== Mammomax ==
Mammomax (Maximus Jensen) is a mutant who has the appearance of a humanoid elephant with super-strength, enhanced durability, and corrosive saliva. In his initial appearances, Mammomax appears as a member of the Brotherhood of Mutants. Mammomax is among the 198 mutants who retain their powers after M-Day, when the Scarlet Witch depowers most mutants on Earth, and allies with the X-Men for protection.

In New X-Men, Mammomax is captured by Weapon Plus and killed by Predator X. During the Krakoan Age, Mammomax is resurrected by the Five and redesigned to have four tusks. He joins Magik's Dark Riders.

== Joseph Manfredi ==
Joseph Manfredi

Publication information
- Publisher: Marvel Comics
- First appearance: Daredevil #118 (Feb. 1975)
- Created by: Gerry Conway (writer); Don Heck (artist)

In-story information
- Species: Human
- Team affiliations: Masters of Evil; Skeleton Crew; Hydra; Circus of Crime; Maggia; Heavy Mettle
- Notable aliases: Giuseppe Manfredi, Joe Silvermane, Blackwing
- Abilities: Expert bat trainer Skilled marksman Specially mutated bats Wears costume made of synthetic stretch fabric over chain mail body armor that grants: Short distanced flight via directed motion hovering

Joseph Manfredi, also known as Blackwing, is a character appearing in American comic books published by Marvel Comics, and was created by Gerry Conway and Don Heck, making his first appearance in Daredevil #118 (February 1975). was born in Orlando, Florida and is the son of the crime lord Silvermane. He first appears as a costumed animal trainer for the Ringmaster's Circus of Crime. While a member of the group, he battles Daredevil.

Manfredi works as an agent for Hydra (serving as the Air Action Division Leader) during the time that Silvermane was the leader of Hydra. He participates in the capture of Foggy Nelson. Manfredi battles Daredevil, Black Widow, Nick Fury, and S.H.I.E.L.D. and is once again defeated by Daredevil.

The second Crimson Cowl recruits Blackwing to join her incarnation of the Masters of Evil. He is defeated alongside them.

Joseph Manfredi abandons the Blackwing identity and becomes a crime lord, founding the group Heavy Mettle. He orders Firestrike to bring him the battle suit of New Warriors member Turbo in hopes of proving himself to his father and the other crime bosses of New York. The New Warriors defeats Manfredi's group and Firestrike is taken into the Witness Protection Program in exchange for testifying against Manfredi.

As Blackwing, Manfredi is an expert trainer of bats, with which he has a highly developed empathic rapport. He has a number of specially mutated bats bred for abnormal strength, size, and intelligence. Manfredi wears a costume consisting of synthetic stretch fabric over chain mail body armor. Devices in his costume give him the power of flight for short distances, via directed motion hovering. Manfredi is also a skilled marksman.

=== Joseph Manfredi in other media ===
Joseph Manfredi appears in the second season of Agent Carter, portrayed by Ken Marino. This version is the leader of the Maggia's Los Angeles branch, a childhood friend of Howard Stark, and formerly in a relationship with Whitney Frost.

== Man-Eater ==
Man-Eater is a character appearing in American comic books published by Marvel Comics.

Malcolm Gregory is a man who was used in a Hydra experiment and combined with a Bengal tiger, transforming him into a humanoid tiger. He is later freed by Battlestar and joined with Silver Sable's Wild Pack.

== Man-Spider ==
Man-Spider is the name of several characters appearing in American comic books published by Marvel Comics.

=== Spider-People ===
The Spider-Island storyline features various minor characters as the Man Spiders, otherwise known as Spider Creatures. This depiction, created by Dan Slott and Stefano Caselli, first appeared in The Amazing Spider-Man #662 (May 2011) initially dubbed Spider-People and officially shown in The Amazing Spider-Man #666 (July 2011). These versions of the Man-Spiders are New York civilians who were given powers akin to Spider-Man due to the Jackal's experimentation. Kaine Parker kills the Spider-Queen, reversing the Man Spiders' mutations.

=== Man-Spider in other media ===
- Peter Parker's Man-Spider form appears in Spider-Man: The Animated Series, voiced by Jim Cummings.
- Peter Parker's Man-Spider form appears in the Spider-Man Unlimited episode "Matters of the Heart".
- Versions of the Man-Spider appear in Ultimate Spider-Man.
  - Peter Parker's Man-Spider form appears in "The Savage Spider-Man".
  - The Spider-Goblin appears in "The Spider-Verse" as an enhanced form of Norman Osborn / Green Goblin after assimilating the combined abilities of various alternate reality Spider-Men.
- The Man-Spiders appear in Spider-Man (2017). They first appear in the five-part episode "Spider-Island", where the Jackal's genetically engineered spider experiments' destruction releases chemicals that cause New York's citizens to obtain spider-like abilities and eventually mutate into Man-Spiders controlled by the Jackal. After the Man-Spiders are cured by the Spider Team, a small army of Man-Spiders appear in "Spider-Man Unmasked" under the control of Swarm until they are similarly cured.
- Man-Spider appears in Marvel Snap.
- A Marvel Noir version of Man-Spider appears in Spider-Noir. This version was a World War I American soldier who was experimented in a German POW camp and turned into a feral spider-like creature.

== Manbot ==
Manbot (Bernie Lechenay) was created by Steven T. Seagle and Scott Clark, and first appeared in Alpha Flight (vol. 2) #1 (1997). Manbot is a biomechanical construct working for Canada's Department H and is a member of the Canadian superhero team known as Alpha Flight. He is also acting as a spy for Department H so as to monitor Alpha Flight surreptitiously.

== Mandrill ==
Mandrill (Jerome Beechman) is a supervillain appearing in American comic books published by Marvel Comics. Mandrill is a mutant resembling his namesake who has battled Daredevil, Shanna the She-Devil, and the Defenders on multiple occasions. He can generate pheromones that place women under his control, which he used to found the all-female cult Black Spectre.

Jerome Beechman is the son of Frederic Beechman, a physicist at Los Alamos National Laboratory in New Mexico, and Margaret Beechman. Due to his parents being affected by radiation, Beechman was born with black skin and tufts of body hair. Beechman's powers later evolved, giving him a mandrill-like appearance.

=== Mandrill in other media ===
- Mandrill appears in The Avengers: Earth's Mightiest Heroes, voiced by Fred Tatasciore.
- Mandrill appears in the M.O.D.O.K. episode "If Saturday Be... For the Boys!", voiced by Kevin Michael Richardson.
- Mandrill appears in Marvel: Avengers Alliance.

== Mangler ==
Mangler is the name of two characters appearing in American comic books published by Marvel Comics.

=== Shadrick Daniels ===
The first version, Shadrick Daniels, debuted in Power Man #34–35. He is the brother of the villain Spear and joins him in his attempt to get revenge on Noah Burnstein. Mangler is a professional wrestler with no super powers and is quickly defeated by Luke Cage.

=== Lucius O'Neil ===
The second version, Lucius O'Neil, debuted in The Thing #28. He is a professional wrestler who underwent the Power Broker's strength augmentation. When the Thing and Sharon Ventura were planning to expose the Power Broker's operations, Mangler was among those sent to stop them.

=== Mangler in other media ===
The Shadrick Daniels incarnation of Mangler makes a non-speaking appearance in The Avengers: Earth's Mightiest Heroes episode "To Steal an Ant-Man".

== Manowar ==
Manowar is a jellyfish-like creature of unknown origins. It was sent by the Brand Corporation to claim Atlantis for them only to be defeated by Namor. Manowar later became a member of the Fathom Five.

== Manslaughter ==
Manslaughter

Publication information
- Publisher: Marvel Comics
- First appearance: (in shadow) The New Defenders #133 (Jul 1984) (fully seen) Defenders #134
- Created by: Peter B. Gillis and Alan Kupperberg

In-story information
- Species: Human Mutant or mutate
- Team affiliations: Defenders/Dragon Circle; Assassin Nation

Manslaughter is an assassin by trade and a psychopath by nature. He appeared for the first time in Defenders #133 (July 1984). He is assigned by a drug czar to assassinate the Defenders. He invades their Rocky Mountain headquarters, and stalks and nearly kills them. He is turned over to the police in Elijah, Colorado. Manslaughter aids the Defenders and the Interloper in battle against Moondragon and the Dragon of the Moon. He joins his life force with Andromeda, the Valkyrie, and Interloper to drive the Dragon of the Moon from Earth, and his body turns to dust. With the others, they later take on host bodies of living persons, and assist Doctor Strange in battling and crushing the Dragon of the Moon. Manslaughter has minor psionic talents, telepathic powers enabling him to perceive the activity of the autonomic nervous systems of other people. He can use this to influence the peripheral vision and subliminal hearing of others, making him invisible and virtually inaudible from a person's peripheral senses.

== Manta ==
- First appearance: The Uncanny X-Men #137 (September 1980)
- Created by: Chris Claremont and John Byrne
- Species: Unidentified extraterrestrial race
- Teams: Imperial Guard
- Abilities: Flight; Infrared vision, allowing her to see in the dark; Generation of blinding flashes of white or blue light; Experiences memory in a manner different from that of most other species

Manta is a member of the Shi'ar Imperial Guard. Created by Chris Claremont and John Byrne, she first appeared in The Uncanny X-Men #137 (September 1980). Manta possesses the power of flight. Manta's eyes only perceive heat (as in infrared radiation), allowing her to see in the dark. She can generate blinding flashes of white or blue light.

=== Manta in other media ===
Manta makes non-speaking appearances in X-Men: The Animated Series.

== Manticore ==
Manticore was an unnamed criminal with no legs who was give a Manticore-resembling armor by the Brand Corporation while being given prosthetic legs. He was sent to retrieve Patsy Walker's Hellcat, during which he fought Ghost Rider.

== Truman Marsh ==
Truman Marsh is a character appearing in Marvel Comics. The character, created by Danny Fingeroth (writer) and Ron Lim (artist), first appeared in Avengers: Deathtrap, the Vault #1 (July 1991). He is the Vault's oppressive warden who had condescension towards the Avengers.

Marsh and the Guardsmen deal with a prison break which is contained by the West Coast Avengers and Freedom Force led by Captain America, Iron Man and Hank Pym; Marsh personally attempts a self-destruct sequence and tried to defend himself, only to be killed by Venom.

=== Truman Marsh in other media ===
Truman Marsh appears in Avengers Assemble, voiced by William Salyers. This version is an alias used by Ultron.

== Simon Marshall ==
Dr. Simon Marshall is a character appearing in Marvel Comics. The character first appeared in Peter Parker, The Spectacular Spider-Man #64 (December 1981), and was created by Bill Mantlo and Ed Hannigan.

Marshall is a pharmaceutical chemist who was working for the Maggia to develop a new designer drug called D-Lite to act as a cheap substitute for heroin. He would lure teenaged runaways and the homeless to his secret laboratory on Ellis Island, where they would be offered food and shelter only to be turned into his test subjects. This is how Tandy Bowen and Tyrone Johnson came into contact with Marshall; the two runaways were injected with D-Lite, which had been fatal to others, and survived the ordeal while also becoming unintentionally empowered. Another of his subjects, an unnamed human-smuggler, was injected with D-Lite by Marshall who waited to see what happened. After the two runaways break open a window and escape, the human-smuggler made a run for it, too. D-Lite had elicit side-effects on him as well, which later resulted in the crime lord Mister Negative. As Cloak and Dagger, Tyrone and Tandy tracked down the people behind the experimention while Spider-Man intervened, trying to stop the former two from killing people. Cloak and Dagger gathered all the people responsible for their condition, including Marshall. Spider-Man tried to stop Cloak and Dagger from killing in cold blood, but failed as Cloak's darkness drove them, including Marshall, to run out of a window and plummet to their deaths.

== Edwin Martynec ==
Edwin Martynec is a geneticist who experimented on himself, gaining the ability to assume the form of a coyote-like creature. Martynec later joins the Heritage Initiative, an organization established by Orchis. Enlisting the local sheriff department, they round up Native Americans from Camp Gazhoo to harvest their mutant genes. Thunderbird defeats Martynec, but spares his life. Following the disbandment of the Heritage Initiative, Martynec joins Orchis as a full-time member.

== Marvel Boy ==
Marvel Boy is the name of several characters appearing in American comic books published by Marvel Comics, including its predecessor companies Timely Comics and Atlas Comics.

=== Martin Burns ===
Martin Burns is the 1940s Marvel Boy. After a mysterious shadow revealed to him that he possessed the power of Hercules, he became a superhero. The character made only two appearances: Daring Mystery Comics #6 (June 1940), by the writer-artist collaborators Joe Simon and Jack Kirby, and USA Comics #7 (February 1943), by writer-artist Bob Oksner. Each featured a wildly disparate version of his origin, with the first positing him as the reincarnation of the mythic Greek demigod, while the second had him accidentally scratched by Hercules' mummified remains in a museum and "infected' with his superhuman strength, although both versions shared the basics noted above. The Official Handbook of the Marvel Universe: Golden Age 2004 reconciles these different origins by stating that there were two Marvel Boys named Martin Burns active in the 1940s.

== Marvel Girl ==
Marvel Girl is the name of two characters appearing in American comic books published by Marvel Comics.

== Masacre ==
Masacre is a Spanish-language vigilante first appearing in Deadpool #3.1 (2016), a member of Mercs for Money, referred to as "The Deadpool of Mexico".

=== Masacre in other media ===
Masacre appears as a playable character in Marvel Contest of Champions.

== Masked Raider ==
=== Jim Gardley ===
Jim Gardley was a cattle rancher in Arizona who in 1849 was falsely accused of cattle rustling, forcing him to go on the run. He took up the mantle of the Masked Raider to clear his name. Under undisclosed circumstances, Gardley found the Eternity Mask, a fragment of the cosmic entity Eternity which grants those who wear it powers equal to whomever they face. In 1880, Gardley is attacked and mortally wounded by unknown assailants. He is found by Dr. Matt Masters, who is also the masked hero Black Rider, and dies in front of him, when he retired the mask from his face, trying to assist him medically. Masters takes the Eternity Mask and decides to search for the killers.

=== Carlo Zota ===
In the modern day, an unidentified individual finds the Eternity Mask. Operating anonymously, he meets several superheroes while investigating the activities of the Enclave, such as their efforts to revive Korvac.

In his investigation, the Masked Raider finds a mysterious murder case, but determining it to not be the Enclave's work he instead draws New York's superheroes attention to it. In a 2022 storyline, Masked Raider was revealed to be Carlo Zota, a member of the Enclave.

== Master Hate ==
Master Hate is a cosmic entity associated with the concept of Hate.

== Master Izo ==
Master Izo

Publication information
- Publisher: Marvel Comics
- First appearance: Daredevil vol. 2 #112 (Oct. 2008)
- Created by: Ed Brubaker (writer); Michael Lark (artist)

In-story information
- Alter ego: Izo
- Team affiliations: The Chaste; The Hand
- Abilities: Superhuman radar senses Echolocation; Formidable martial artist Immortality

Master Izo is a character appearing in American comic books published by Marvel Comics. A superhero martial artist, he is associated with Daredevil, and first appeared in Daredevil vol. 2 #112. He was created by Ed Brubaker and Michael Lark.

The man who would be known in the modern age only as Master Izo was a member of the organization The Hand hundreds of years ago in Feudal Japan. Following the death of its founder, Kagenobu Yoshioka, and its transformation from a samurai alliance into a ninja cult in service to a demon, Izo chose to leave. At this time he put out his eyes, which enabled him to see the world, he claimed, as Yoshioka had (and as Daredevil later would).

Izo would later found The Chaste, a rival martial arts association situated atop a sheer cliff known as the Wall. However, his unhindered nature eventually led his students to vote him out, disgusted with his drinking and gambling. Stick took his place as the leader of the Chaste. Izo was revealed to have been present shortly after the accident which gave Matt Murdock his superhuman senses, and reported this information anonymously to Stick. Later still, he became the trainer of the future supervillain and Hand assassin Lady Bullseye, who he promised would one day become the Hand's leader. He is mentioned a number of times in the Book of the Iron Fist.

Much later, following the death of the Skrull posing as Hand leader Elektra, Izo journeyed to New York City, where the four remaining ninja-lords of the Hand were assembling to forcibly induct Daredevil as the new leader. Izo intervened to assist Daredevil in driving them off, which led them to switch their focus to the Kingpin. Izo's purpose was to manoeuvre Daredevil into taking the position, as a means of reforming the Hand away from its corrupted state. He was also revealed to have placed Black Tarantula within the Hand as a mole, unbeknownst to Daredevil. Ultimately, Daredevil accepted the position, and ordered that the Kingpin and Lady Bullseye be banished. Her erstwhile ally's treachery exposed, Lady Bullseye vowed to kill Izo, who told her to "get in line." Subsequently, Izo fakes his own murder at the hands of Daredevil to trick the Hand into accepting Daredevil as their leader. He later shows up in Shadowland to reveal to the heroes involved in the battle against Daredevil and the Hand to explain his discovery that Matt Murdock had been possessed by Krahllak.

Master Izo is a formidable martial artist, one of the finest anywhere in the world, including being able to wield two katana at once. He has considerable stamina, enabling him to traverse the city by jumping on rooftops. Despite (or rather, as a result of) being blind, he has superhuman-radar senses, much as Daredevil does. He also evidently possesses some form of immortality or at least life-extending capability, as he is now somewhere in the area of 500 years old.

== Master Weaver ==
Master Weaver is the name of several characters appearing in American comic books published by Marvel Comics. All iterations of the character are responsible for spinning and maintaining the Web of Life and Destiny.

=== Original Master Weaver ===
The previous Master Weaver is a temporal paradox version of Karn who was held captive by the Inheritors during the "Spider-Verse" storyline. They obtained him at the cost of the Inheritors' unnamed matriarch, with Solus blaming her death on Karn.

After being murdered by a time-displaced Superior Spider-Man, Karn is succeeded by his past self.

=== Karn ===
Karn, a former member of the Inheritors, becomes the Master Weaver following the death of the previous Master Weaver, his future self. Despite lacking the spider powers required to become a Master Weaver, Karn manages to do so, having absorbed the life force of several alternate versions of Spider-Man. This lasts until the "Spider-Geddon" storyline, where he is killed by his sister Verna.

=== Spider-Zero ===
Spider-Zero is a resident of Earth-19166 who possesses spider powers. She escapes the destruction of her universe following an Incursion and eventually becomes Karn's successor.

=== Master Weaver in other media ===
An unidentified version of Master Weaver and Spider-Zero appear in Marvel Rivals, with the former voiced by Andrew Kishino and the latter voiced by Daisy Lightfoot.

== Mastermind ==
Mastermind is the name of several characters appearing in American comic books published by Marvel Comics.

=== Don Bowers ===
Don Bowers is an employee of Stark Industries who took up the identity of Mastermind and led the militant Smashers gang when he was embezzling money from a Stark Industries branch on the Pacific island of Lakani that he managed which attracted the attention of Iron Man. He and the Smashers were defeated by Iron Man with Mastermind being publicly unmasked. Bowers and the Smashers were handed over to the police.

=== Computer ===
Mastermind is a computer under Captain Britain's home, Braddock Manor. He first appeared in Captain Britain #12 (December 1976). This Mastermind was an alien artificial intelligence that had been built by Captain Britain's father, James Braddock, Senior. Mastermind is later reprogrammed by Kang the Conqueror and subsequently destroyed.

=== Martinique Jason ===
Martinique Jason first appeared in Wolverine/Gambit: Victims #2 (August 1995) and was created by Jeph Loeb and Tim Sale, with subsequent appearances in the next two issues of the series.

Martinique Jason is one of the daughters of the illusionist, the original Mastermind. She has an intense hatred for her half-sister, also known as Lady Mastermind, Regan Wyngarde (who first used their now shared-codename).

== Mastermind Excello ==
Mastermind Excello is the name of two characters appearing in American comic books published by Marvel Comics.

=== Earl Everett ===
Earl Everett is the first Mastermind Excello. His only appearances for several decades were in Mystic Comics #2 and 3, published in the 1940s by Marvel's forerunner, Timely Comics, during a period that is known as the Golden Age of Comic Books. He later appears in the 2000s limited series The Twelve.

Mastermind Excello is a precognitive with mental powers and physically honed to perfection who uses his powers to help the US Naval Intelligence Department. He makes use of his assets sensing spies on the European battlefield, to catch them, and thwart a gang of railway saboteurs.

== Mastodon ==
Mastodon is the name of three characters appearing in American comic books published by Marvel Comics.

=== First version ===
Mastodon

Publication information
- Publisher: Marvel Comics
- First appearance: Wolverine #48 (November 1991)
- Created by: Larry Hama; Marc Silvestri

In-story information
- Team affiliations: Team X

Mastodon is a character in the Marvel Universe, primarily featured in the Wolverine comic books. He first appeared in Wolverine #48 (in a flashback).

He was revealed to have been a member of Team X (along with Wolverine, Sabretooth, Maverick, Kestrel, and Silver Fox) and later a test subject of Weapon X.

He appeared in the flesh for the first time in as an old man. He was supposed to be aging much slower than other humans due to an aging-suppression factor given to him at Weapon X. As the aging-suppression failed, he ultimately died of old age.

=== Earth-93060 version ===
The Earth-93060 version of Mastodon is Timothy Halloran who is depicted with an elephant-like hide and tusks.

== Matador ==
Matador is the name of two characters appearing in Marvel Comics.

=== Manuel Eloganto ===
The first one, Manuel Eloganto, first appeared in Daredevil #5 (Dec. 1964), and was created by Stan Lee and Wally Wood. He was once the most famous bull fighter of Spain. However, his cruelty and brutality towards the bulls made the crowd hate him. When a riot broke loose during one of his performances, Manuel had to be rushed to the hospital. After his recovery, he swore revenge upon all mankind. From that moment on, he vanished from sight, starting to make evil schemes. Matador primarily crossed paths with Daredevil and fought him on numerous occasions. He even joined the Emissaries of Evil and teamed up with characters such as Electro, Gladiator, Leap-Frog, and Stilt-Man. He later ironically teamed up with Man-Bull. Despite being seen as something of a joke villain, he has managed to frequently pose a threat to Daredevil.

=== Juan ===
The second one, Juan, first appeared in Daredevil vol. 2 #89 (Sept. 2006), and was created by Ed Brubaker and Michael Lark. As one of finest matadors in Spain, Juan was hired by Vanessa Fisk, in a complicated plot against Daredevil, to carry out various ploys. Matador agreed, and learned he would be teamed up with Lily Lucca, Tombstone, and lawyer Alton Lennox.

== Match ==
Match

Publication information
- Publisher: Marvel Comics
- First appearance: New Mutants vol. 2 #7 (January 2004)
- Created by: Nunzio DeFilippis; Christina Weir

In-story information
- Alter ego: Benjamin "Ben" Hammil
- Species: Human Mutant
- Team affiliations: Paragons training squad Xavier Institute; X-Men in training Jean Grey School Students
- Abilities: Fire manipulation Immunity to extreme heat

Match (Ben Hammil) is a character appearing in comic books published by Marvel Comics. A mutant, he attended the Xavier Institute before its closing and was the field leader of the Paragons training squad.

=== Publication history ===
The character, created by Nunzio DeFilippis and Christina Weir, first appeared in New Mutants vol. 2 #7 (January 2004). DeFilippis revealed that while he and Weir created the character, he was based on a background mutant from New X-Men: Academy X #7. "We saw a cool bit of artwork in the background of a panel (I think it was Carlo Barberi who first drew him) and thought for a few seconds about a name, codename, and power set."

=== Fictional character biography ===
While spending time in his home town park, Ben Hammil suddenly manifested his mutant powers. Unable to control his powers, Ben set flame to the town's park.

After the manifestation of his powers, Ben was enrolled in the Xavier School for Gifted Youngsters. After enrolling at the institute, Match is assigned to the Paragons training squad under Wolfsbane's tutelage. Though hot-tempered, Match is a natural leader, and consequently, was named as the field leader for his squad.

Ben's abilities are pyrokinesis, enabling him to produce and manipulate flame. In addition, he is seemingly immune to fire and high temperatures. As a side effect of his powers, Ben's head remains constantly aflame, though it appears that he can control the extent of the flaming; during a Danger Room session, he is able to maintain some level of stealth by lowering the intensity of his head flame. Ben's body is always glowing, and emits heat, however it is not hot enough to burn his clothing.

=== Match in other media ===
Match makes a cameo appearance in Dark Phoenix, portrayed by Lamar Johnson.

== Robert Maverick ==
Robert Maverick
- Robert Maverick as depicted in New Avengers (vol. 4) #8 (March 2016). Art by Marcus To (penciler/inker) and Dono Sánchez-Almara (colorist).

Publication information
- Publisher: Marvel Comics
- First appearance: Avengers vol. 6 #0 (October 2015); U.S.Avengers #1 (January 2017; as Red Hulk)
- Created by: Al Ewing; Gerardo Sandoval

In-story information
- Species: Human mutate
- Team affiliations: United States Army; U.S.Avengers
- Notable aliases: Red Hulk, Iron Hulk
- Abilities: Military tactician As Red Hulk: Superhuman strength, stamina and durability Enhanced leaping Fire resistance

General Robert L. Maverick is a character appearing in American comic books published by Marvel Comics. The character was created by Al Ewing and Gerardo Sandoval, and first appeared in Avengers (vol. 6) #0 (October 2015).

After Sunspot defeats the Maker, Maverick approaches him with a proposal to collaborate with the U.S. government. This leads to the merger of Sunspot's Avengers Idea Mechanics—formed from the remnants of Advanced Idea Mechanics—into a new government-affiliated entity known as American Intelligence Mechanics. As part of this initiative, Maverick is selected for his unique genetic compatibility to undergo the Hulk Plug-In implanted in his wrist which allows him to transform into the second Red Hulk for approximately one hour every day and a half. Maverick joins the U.S.Avengers as part of the organization's primary field team.

In Sam Wilson, Captain America (2025), Maverick becomes the head of security at Eaglestar International. Eaglestar International performed experiments on Maverick which give him leathery wings.

=== Robert Maverick in other media ===
Robert Maverick / Red Hulk appears as an alternate costume for Thunderbolt Ross / Red Hulk in Marvel: Future Fight.

== Ebony Maw ==
Ebony Maw is a fictional character appearing in American comic books published by Marvel Comics. Created by Jonathan Hickman and Jerome Opeña, he is a prominent member of the Black Order, a team of aliens who work for Thanos.

Ebony Maw is described as not being a fighter, but a dangerous thinker of the Black Order, due to his powers of persuasion and mind control. When Thanos targets Earth during the Infinity storyline, Maw is dispatched to deal with Doctor Strange. Maw uses his abilities to control Doctor Strange and force him to summon Shuma-Gorath.

When Black Bolt detonates a Terrigen Bomb, spreading Terrigen Mist across Earth, Thanos's son Thane undergoes Terrigenesis and gains the ability to kill anyone with a touch. Maw gives Thane a containment suit to control his powers. When the Avengers arrive in the Inhuman city of Orollan to defeat Thanos, Thane decides to assist them and traps Thanos and Proxima Midnight in amber. Maw begins mentoring Thane, encouraging him to become even greater than Thanos.

=== Ebony Maw in other media ===
- Ebony Maw appears in Avengers Assemble, voiced by René Auberjonois.
- Ebony Maw appears in Guardians of the Galaxy, voiced by James Urbaniak. This version is initially a member of the Black Order before joining the Universal Believers.
- Ebony Maw appears in media set in the Marvel Cinematic Universe, voiced and motion-captured by Tom Vaughan-Lawlor. This version has telekinetic abilities and serves as Thanos' herald.
  - Maw is introduced in Avengers: Infinity War (2018), where he is assigned to retrieve the Time Stone, but is killed by Tony Stark and Peter Parker.
  - An alternate timeline version of Maw appears in Avengers: Endgame.
  - Alternate timeline versions of Maw appear in What If...?.
- Ebony Maw appears as an NPC in Marvel Avengers Alliance.
- Ebony Maw appears as a boss and unlockable playable character in Marvel Future Fight.
- Ebony Maw appears as an unlockable playable character in Lego Marvel Super Heroes 2 via the "Marvel's Avengers: Infinity War Movie Level Pack" DLC.
- Ebony Maw appears as a support character in Marvel Puzzle Quest.
- Ebony Maw appears as an unlockable playable character, mini-boss, and boss in Marvel Contest of Champions.
- Ebony Maw appears as a boss in Marvel Ultimate Alliance 3: The Black Order, voiced by Todd Haberkorn.
- Ebony Maw appears in Marvel Snap.

== Maxam ==
Maxam is a character appearing in American comic books published by Marvel Comics. was created by Jim Starlin and Tom Raney, and first appeared in Warlock and the Infinity Watch #12 (January 1993).

Maxam first appeared in a vision of Gamora, then wielder of the Time Gem, wherein Maxam murdered Adam Warlock. He later appeared on the island of the Infinity Watch with no memory of his past. Eventually it was revealed that Maxam was from an alternate future earth where the majority of humanity had been wiped out by the Universal Church of Truth, an organization ruled by the future evil self of Adam Warlock known as the Magus. Maxam was sent back in time to destroy Adam before he could become the Magus. Maxam can summon additional body mass increasing his strength and durability to levels he has stated as being an even match for Drax the Destroyer and Hercules, even allowing him to, through supreme effort, break free of the Invisible Woman's force-field when she had imprisoned him.

== Mayhem ==
Mayhem

Publication information
- Publisher: Marvel Comics
- First appearance: (as Bridget O'Reilly) Cloak and Dagger #1 (October 1983) (as Mayhem) Cloak and Dagger vol. 2 #5 (March 1986)
- Created by: Bill Mantlo; Rick Leonardi

In-story information
- Alter ego: Brigid O'Reilly
- Species: Human mutate
- Partnerships: Cloak and Dagger
- Abilities: Breathes toxic gas that produces multiple effects; Retractable talons; Levitation

Mayhem (Brigid O'Reilly) is a character appearing in American comic books published by Marvel Comics. The character of detective Brigid O'Reilly first appeared in Cloak and Dagger #1 (October 1983) and was created by Bill Mantlo and Rick Leonardi. In Cloak and Dagger vol. 2 #5 (March 1986), O'Reilly is killed and resurrected as Mayhem.

Brigid O'Reilly was originally a police detective in Manhattan when she learned that Cloak and Dagger were attacking criminals in her precinct. She at first wanted to bring the pair to justice, but she eventually learned to trust the young crime-fighters. Later, she took a squad of police officers to investigate a warehouse belonging to the same pharmaceutical company that was behind Cloak's and Dagger's powers. Some corrupt policemen, led by Roger Falcone, exposed the other police officers to a gas to asphyxiate them. With her dying breath, Brigid swore vengeance on Falcone. As Brigid lay dying, Cloak and Dagger found her, and though were too late to save the other police, Cloak surrounded her and Dagger with darkness, while Dagger tried to revive her with light. When this appeared not to work, the pair abandoned her body to search for those responsible.

Though O'Reilly died, she was reborn as Mayhem. In this new form, Mayhem helped Cloak and Dagger find and fight the corrupt police. She then killed Falcone as promised. She then became a vigilante, showing no mercy to the drug dealers and other criminals she pursues.

Mayhem was considered as a "potential recruit" for the Initiative program, according to Civil War: Battle Damage Report.

=== Powers and abilities of Mayhem ===
Mayhem exudes a green, venomous gas from her pores. If this gas enters another person's bloodstream, it paralyzes the person for a varying amount of time. Mayhem attacks people by raking their skin with her talon-like fingernails so that the gas will enter their bloodstreams. The gas can also act like a truth serum, forcing targets to tell the truth. Dagger's "light-knives" dissipate upon contact with this gas. Mayhem can levitate herself and fly.

=== Mayhem in other media ===
Brigid O'Reilly appears in Cloak & Dagger, portrayed by Emma Lahana. This version is a detective who formerly worked in Harlem before moving to New Orleans. In the first season, O'Reilly allies with Tyrone Johnson to stop a dark energy called the Terror from being released by the Roxxon company, but is exposed to the Terror's energy. The second season revealed that this incident created a clone, later named Mayhem, who possesses all of her memories and knowledge. However, Mayhem is a ruthless vigilante with no compunction about murder. After ending up in the Loa Dimension, O'Reilly encounters Mayhem, resulting in them merging.

== Maystorm ==
Maystorm was originally conceived for the New Champions, a series of covers celebrating Spider-Boy by imagining hypothetical non-canon "forgotten" sidekicks for other Marvel characters with her being depicted as the forgotten sidekick of Storm. In Maystorm's case, she debuted in the New Champions variant cover for X-Men (vol. 6) #27 and was conceptualized by artist Peach Momoko. Momoko decided to include Maystorm in the series Ultimate X-Men, wanting to expand on her character.

An ordinary teenager from the super-nation of Hi no Kuni, one of the seven sovereign territories that make up the world, Mei Igarashi moved to urban Kirisaki City with her dysfunctional family and began idolizing a freedom fighter from West Africa with mastery over storms on social media. A month after moving into the neighborhood, Mei came across a frightened cat that had run away from her neighbor's house. Approached by its owner hiding behind the door, she returned the mascot, only to have the cat suddenly become aggressive and scratch her arm. Later that night, Mei was awakened by the sound of her parents arguing downstairs and joined them to try to stop it, only to have her father hit her after making a negative comment about him. Mei's trauma caused her mutant power to manifest, turning her hair and eyes white.

Mei appears to be a member of the Gyaru subculture, also known as Gal, which is a Japanese fashion subculture characterized by a nonconformist and rebellious attitude towards Japanese social and fashion norms. In particular, Mei appears to be a Kogyaru, also known as Kogal, which incorporates the high school uniform into the overall style. Maystorm and her group, the X-Men, go on to join the opposition against the Maker.

== Kirsten McDuffie ==
Kirsten McDuffie is a character appearing in American comic books published by Marvel Comics. The character, created by Mark Waid and Paolo Rivera, first appeared in Daredevil vol. 3 #1 (July 2011).

Kirsten McDuffie is an assistant district attorney who collaborated with Daredevil. Over time, their friendly relationship developed into a romantic one and they dated.

=== Kirsten McDuffie in other media ===
Kirsten McDuffie appears in Daredevil: Born Again, portrayed by Nikki M. James. This version is a former district attorney who is Matt Murdock's new partner following Foggy Nelson's death.

== Tiny McKeever ==
Tiny McKeever is a character appearing in American comic books published by Marvel Comics. Created by Kurt Busiek and Pat Olliffe, he first appeared in Untold Tales of Spider-Man #1 (July 1995).

Brian McKeever is a member of Flash Thompson's clique who frequently bully Peter Parker. McKeever goes on to befriend Peter after Peter offers to help him study, frequently defending Parker from Thompson.

== Megan McLaren ==
- Further reading: Megan McLaren at the Comic Book DB (archived from the original)

Megan McLaren is a character in Marvel Comics. The character, created by Kurt Busiek and Mark Bagley, first appeared in Thunderbolts #1 (April 1997).

Megan McLaren is a reporter who works for WJBP-TV and is highly regarded as a journalist. She mostly reported the Thunderbolts' activities such as the group's battle with the Elements of Doom, Graviton, and Mach I's surrender.

=== Megan McLaren in other media ===
- Megan McLaren appears in Avengers Assemble, voiced by Vanessa Marshall. This version is a reporter for the Daily Bugle.
- Megan McLaren appears in Luke Cage, portrayed by Dawn-Lyen Gardner. This version is a reporter for WJBP-TV.

== Joy Meachum ==
Joy Meachum is a character who first appeared in Marvel Premiere #18 and was created by Doug Moench and Larry Hama. The character is depicted in the comics as the daughter of Harold Meachum and the niece of Ward Meachum.

She blames Iron Fist for her father's death and attempts to kill him on several occasions, even going so far as to hire Steel Serpent to aid her in getting revenge.

A crime boss known as Boss Morgan takes Joy hostage because Rand Meachum Inc. was ruining his business. Iron Fist rescued her, but in a last-ditch effort for revenge she asked Morgan to kill him. When Morgan refused, she attempted to do so herself, but found she could not and ended her feud with him. Since then Joy has helped Iron Fist and his allies on their numerous adventures.

=== Joy Meachum in other media ===
Joy Meachum appears in Iron Fist, portrayed by Jessica Stroup as an adult and Aimee Laurence as a child. This version is the daughter of Harold Meachum, brother of Ward Meachum, and a childhood friend of Danny Rand.

== Ward Meachum ==
Ward Meachum is the brother of Harold Meachum, the CEO of Rand-Meachum Inc. After Iron Fist is falsely blamed for the death of Harold, Ward and his niece, Joy Meachum, hire villains to kill him.

Ward first hires Steel Serpent to get revenge on Iron Fist. Due to Ward's criminal connections, Steel Serpent states that he cannot work for him. After beating up Ward's bodyguards and leaving Ward alive, Steel Serpent explains that his debt to Joy had been paid and that he would take revenge on Iron Fist by himself.

Ward enlists Shades and Comanche, giving Shades a laser-shooting visor and Comanche a set of trick arrows to take down Power Man and Iron Fist. After obtaining the Power Gem of Quon, Ward and his men place the gem on a pedestal and summon Master Khan back to Earth. Khan tells Ward about the gem's ability to take away Shou-Lao's powers from Iron Fist, which would give Khan's dragons the power to kill Iron Fist. Iron Fist is able to destroy the Power Gem of Quon to send Khan back to K'un-L'un, and Ward and his men are arrested.

Ward Meachum collaborates with Super-Skrull to take over Earth in exchange for winning the hand of the "most beautiful woman in the galaxy". Ward is later informed by an Oracle Inc. worker and Phoebe Marrs that Super-Skrull's offer would have unspecified consequences. Ward turns against Super-Skrull, only to be killed by him.

=== Ward Meachum in other media ===
Ward Meachum appears in Iron Fist, portrayed primarily by Tom Pelphrey and by Ilan Eskenazi as a teenager. This version is the son of Harold Meachum, brother of Joy Meachum, and a childhood friend of Danny Rand. After Harold is killed by Ward during a battle with Rand, Ward takes in Rand as a business partner.

== Megawatt ==
Megawatt (Dirk Leyden) is a character appearing in American comic books published by Marvel Comics. The character was created by writer Kurt Busiek and artist Steven Butler, and first appeared in Spider-Man Unlimited #2 (June 1993).

Megawatt was a former Australian convict turned actor turned supervillain. He was given powers by Jonas Harrow. Megawatt had the ability to store and release large amounts of electricity, enabling him to shoot bursts of energy and jump superhuman distances. He fought Spider-Man to a draw before running out of energy reserves. He escaped from police custody due to a downed power pole, and became an international film success.

=== Megawatt in other media ===
Megawatt appears in Spider-Noir, portrayed by Andrew Caldwell.

== Mei Min ==
Mei Min is a character appearing in American comics published by Marvel Comics. The character was created by writer Alyssa Wong and artist Michael YG, and first appeared in Iron Fist vol. 6 #1 (February 2022).

== Melee ==
Melee is the name of two characters appearing in American comics published by Marvel Comics.

=== Initiative member ===
The first Melee first appeared in Avengers: The Initiative #8 (December 2007), and was created by Dan Slott, Christos N. Gage, and Stefano Caselli. A Latino-American girl of unknown origins and a master of all martial arts, Melee was recruited into the Fifty State Initiative and sent to its training facility Camp Hammond. After the Skrull invasion, Melee was assigned to further training at Camp Hammond, in order to become a martial arts instructor.

=== Thao Tran ===
Thao Tran first appeared in Exceptional X-Men #2 (October 2024) and was created by Eve Ewing and Carmen Carnero.

Thao Tran is a young mutant student of Vietnamese and Potawatomi descent who has the ability to turn invisible and intangible. When Alex Luna was being harassed by students, she stepped in and accidentally escalated the situation the point Kitty Pryde stepped in. She would later join Axo and Trista Marshall under Kate and Emma Frost's tutelage.

== Melter ==
Melter is the name of several characters in Marvel Comics.

=== Bruno Horgan ===
Bruno Horgan is driven into bankruptcy when a government safety inspection team proves that he is using inferior materials, with the defense contracts awarded to his competitor Tony Stark. Discovering that one of his faulty devices is capable of generating a beam capable of "melting" anything composed of iron, Horgan redesigns the device so that it can be strapped to his chest and becomes the criminal Melter, intending to sabotage Stark's business.

Melter reappears as an employee of Baron Zemo (who has upgraded the melting beam to affect all metals) as part of the Masters of Evil. He helps spray Adhesive X over the city. Melter meets Iron Man as the Avengers first meet the Masters, but Iron Man knocks him away using his magnetic repulsor. The Masters are defeated, with Melter being jailed after Iron Man drenches him with water, preventing his beam from working.

Eventually, Melter manages to augment his melting ray's power to its peak. Before he can employ it, he is ambushed and killed by the Scourge of the Underworld.

=== Christopher Colchiss ===
Christopher Colchiss first appears in Dark Reign: Young Avengers #1 (July 2009) and was created by Paul Cornell and Mark Brooks.

Christopher Colchiss is a mutant with innate melting abilities who later adopts the Melter name and is recruited to lead the Young Masters, a teenage super team opposing the Young Avengers. Unlike the original Melter, his abilities also extend to organic material. Melter has serious doubts about the moral conviction of most his teammates, and twice he has made mistakes with his powers that killed people. These incidents have resulted in making him hesitant to use his powers in combat.

Christopher is welcomed into the mutant nation of Krakoa and given a clean slate. For unknown reasons, he begins destroying parts of the island and spying on the Quiet Council of Krakoa. Despite claiming he only wanted to help Krakoa and being given two warnings, Melter is thrown into the Pit of Exile. Once in the pit, he and the other prisoners are greeted by Sabretooth. Melter and the other prisoners are released in exchange for tracking down Sabretooth, who has escaped.

Melter is later killed by Wolverine.

=== Unnamed criminal ===
Roderick Kingsley sells the original Melter's costume and gear to an unnamed criminal. Melter is present with Hobgoblin (Kingsley's butler Claude) when he leads his forces into battling the Goblin King's Goblin Nation. After Hobgoblin is killed by Goblin King, Melter defects to the Goblin Nation.

Melter appears as a member of Swarm's Sinister Six, who attack Spider-Man and the students of the Jean Grey School for Higher Learning. After Hellion defeats Swarm, Melter and the other villains surrender.

=== Melter 2099 ===
Melter 2099 is a member of the Masters of Evil in the unified Marvel 2099 reality of Earth-2099.

== Menace ==
Menace (Lily Hollister) is a character appearing in American comic books published by Marvel Comics. The character is most commonly depicted as an enemy of Spider-Man. Her first appearance as Lily Hollister is in The Amazing Spider-Man #545, and her first appearance as Menace is in The Amazing Spider-Man #550 which is the start of the second story arc in the "Brand New Day" storyline.

Lily Hollister is a socialite who dated Harry Osborn. She uncovers one of Norman Osborn's secret rooms and accidentally absorbs spilled chemicals, giving her the ability to transform into a goblin-like form. Stealing a weapons cache of Norman, Menace was later hunted down by Jackpot. During her search, she met Spider-Man and reluctantly accepted his help. Menace attacked a council meeting and kidnapped councilwoman Lisa Parfrey, with Spider-Man and Jackpot working together to try and stop her. Menace's glider slammed into the rescued councilwoman, killing her, and Menace escaped the crime scene, but not before accusing Spider-Man of being responsible for the woman's death.

During the Dark Reign storyline, Lily reappears in her Menace form to Harry, threatening Harry's life at first before then showing Harry that she is pregnant. In the "Origin of Species" storyline, Lily crashes into Harry's coffee shop and gives birth to a baby boy. It is later determined that Norman Osborn is not the baby's father. Lily is relieved that her child is safe, but runs away because she feels she is unfit to raise him. Spider-Man later tests Harry Osborn's blood, revealing that Harry is in fact the father, and leaves the child named Stanley Osborn in Harry's care.

As part of the Marvel NOW! event, Menace returns showing her allegiance to the Goblin King as part of the underground Goblin Nation while preparing for the fight against Superior Spider-Man. During the Goblin King's takeover of Manhattan, the real Spider-Man returns and defeats the Goblin Nation. In the process, Spider-Man uses an antidote for the goblin serum on Menace, turning her back to a normal human.

=== Menace in other media ===
Menace appears in Spider-Man: Edge of Time, voiced by Tara Strong.

== Erasmus Mendel ==
Captain Erasmus Mendel is a character appearing in American comic books for Marvel Comics. The character was created by Jonathan Hickman and Pepe Larraz, and first appeared in House of X #1 (July 2019).

Erasmus Mendel is a member of Orchis and the husband of Alia Gregor. He is the head of security of the Sentinel space station.

== Donald Menken ==
- Further reading: Donald Menken at the Comic Book DB (archived from the original); Donald Menken at the Grand Comics Database

Donald Menken is a character in Marvel Comics. The character, created by Roger Stern and John Romita Jr., first appeared in The Amazing Spider-Man #239 (April 1983).

As the personal assistant of Norman Osborn, he is immediately loyal and unflinching. His first task was to make sure that one of Oscorp's research scientists remove any traces of work. Not only did he assist Norman, he also answered to Harry Osborn and Liz Allan. Menken was eventually promoted to Director of Personnel.

=== Donald Menken in other media ===
- Donald Menken appears in The Spectacular Spider-Man, voiced by Greg Weisman. This version is Norman Osborn's enforcer.
- Donald Menken appears in The Amazing Spider-Man 2 (2014), portrayed by Colm Feore. This version was the personal assistant to the ailing Norman Osborn before becoming vice president of Oscorp and head of their board of directors who opposes Harry Osborn's ascension to Oscorp's president. Following Max Dillon's accident, Menken attempts to frame Harry, but the latter forces him to locate Richard Parker's cross-species spider venom. After Harry is turned into the Green Goblin, Menken flees.
- Donald Menken appears in The Amazing Spider-Man 2 video game, voiced by Glenn Steinbaum in the console versions and Christopher Daniel Barnes in the mobile version. In the former, Menken is Harry Osborn's assistant who the Chameleon poses as on behalf of the Kingpin; in the latter, Menken is a representative for Oscorp in selling weapons to criminal gangs who is eventually captured by Spider-Man and killed by the Green Goblin.

== Mentor ==
Mentor is the name of two characters appearing in American comic books published by Marvel Comics.

=== Imperial Guard ===
- First appearance: The X-Men #107 (October 1977)
- Created by: Chris Claremont; Dave Cockrum
- Species: Unidentified extraterrestrial race
- Teams: Imperial Guard
- Abilities: Instantaneous processing of vast amounts of information
- Aliases: Strel

Mentor is a member of the Shi'ar Imperial Guard. Created by Chris Claremont and Dave Cockrum, the character first appeared in X-Men #107 (October 1977). Mentor is capable of instantaneous processing of vast amounts of information. Like many members of the Imperial Guard, Mentor is the analog of a character from DC Comics' Legion of Super-Heroes: in his case Brainiac 5.

Mentor was one of the first initiates of the Imperial Guard, assembled by the Shi'ar along with Gladiator, Magic, Mentor, and Quasar for the purpose of stopping Rook'shir. Defeating Rook'shir, the Guard becomes the first line of defense of the Shi'ar Empire.

== Meows Morales ==
Meows Morales is a cat version of Miles Morales from an unidentified universe. He solely appears in Spider-Man Annual #1 (2019), where he participates in the Secret Roar.

== Mercurio the 4-D Man ==
Mercurio the 4-D Man is a character appearing in American comic books published by Marvel Comics. He first appeared in Thor #208 (February 1973), and was created by Gerry Conway and John Buscema. Introduced as an enemy of Thor, Mercurio later appeared as an enemy of Captain Marvel (Mar-Vell) and Agent Venom (Flash Thompson).

Mercurio is a native of the planet Gramos, a world threatened with extinction when a gravitational distortion blocks out all sunlight. In a bid to save Gramos, Mercurio is chosen as a government psycho-explorer to project his consciousness across the galaxy to Earth, where he takes control of a wealthy landlord and uses his resources to build a device to siphon Earth's electro-magnetic field. Mercurio also detects strange energies coming from the offices of Donald Blake, the alter-ego of Thor. Witnessing a transformation from Blake to Thor, Mercurio siphons some of the magical energy in an attempt to transport his body across space to Earth. However, this fails and gives Mercurio the ability to generate ice.

Several weeks after returning to Gramos, Mercurio leads an army to find the God Jewel, a gem containing enough energy to indefinitely sustain Gramos. The God Jewel is revealed to be sentient and evolves into a humanoid form called Xorr, and is capable of sucking the life energy from any source. Coincidentally, Thor and several allies are also seeking the God Jewel as it has imprisoned two Asgardian goddesses, Sif and Karnilla. With Thor's help, Xorr is defeated, and Mercurio retrieves several fragments of the God Jewel for use on Gramos.

Mercurio begins assembling an army with the intention of using it to establish a galaxy-spanning Gramosian empire. Agent Venom (Flash Thompson) foils his attempts to steal resources from the home planets of the P'qui and the Wugin, and to acquire chemical weapons derived from the blood of kidnapped Vvexians. Mercurio escapes and swears vengeance on Thompson.

=== Powers and abilities of Mercurio the 4-D Man ===
As a native of the planet Gramos, Mercurio possesses an alien metabolism granting him the ability to generate intense heat, usually in the form of a fireball or walls of flame. Following his transformation into a half-negative being, Mercurio gains the ability to emit intense cold from the left side of his body. Mercurio also possesses enhanced strength and durability as well as flight and the ability to teleport.

== Mercy ==
- First appearance: The Incredible Hulk (vol. 2) #338 (October 1987)
- Created by: Todd McFarlane and Peter David
- Species: alien
- Teams: Thunderbolts
- Abilities: Flight; Intangibility; Invisibility; Teleportation; Shapeshifting; Energy projection in spear form Telepathy; Astral projection Extrasensory perceptions
- Aliases: Angel of Mercy

Mercy (Abigail Mercy Wright) is a supervillain appearing in American comic books published by Marvel Comics. Mercy first appeared in The Incredible Hulk (vol. 2) #338 (October 1987), and was created by Peter David and Todd McFarlane.

Abigail Wright is an extremely unpredictable and dangerous foe, and has given multiple explanations to her origin, including being an alien, an angel, or (much later) a woman who gained her powers through radiation treatments to save her from brain cancer. She considers herself on a mission of "mercy" to "help" those who are overcome with despair, but do not have the strength to commit suicide, believing that she is doing them a favor. This can include anything from dropping an electric toaster into the bath, to guiding the spirit of a comatose person to the afterlife. The Hulk is one of the few people Mercy has been unable to "help" as he refuses to stop fighting, no matter how horrible his existence may be.

As part of the Marvel NOW! event, Mercy later appears as one of the Red Hulk's recruits for his new black ops incarnation of the Thunderbolts.

=== Mercy in other media ===
Mercy appears in The Incredible Hulk: Ultimate Destruction, voiced by Vanessa Marshall. This version is Emil Blonsky's bodyguard who assists in eliminating gamma-irradiated beings and obtained her powers from gamma radiation that was used to cure her brain tumor. She is later killed by Blonsky after attempting to tell the Hulk about Blonsky's plans.

== Meridius ==
Meridius is a time-traveling Symbiote being and a King in Black. He would later be revealed to be one of several future versions of Eddie Brock.

== William Metzger ==
William Metzger is a character who was modeled after white supremacist Tom Metzger. The character was created by writer Joe Casey and artist Steve Rude, and first appeared in X-Men: Children of the Atom #1 (September 1999). Metzger was the head of the Anti-Mutant Militia as well as The Militia Press, tormenting Jean Grey, Beast, Iceman and Angel before being killed by Magneto.

=== William Metzger in other media ===
- A similar character, Colonel Moss, appears in Wolverine and the X-Men, voiced by Michael Ironside. This version is the head of the Mutant Response Division (M.R.D.) in the present, and allies with Master Mold as the cyborg Ahab who is in charge of mutant concentration camps in a Sentinel-dominated future.
- Bill Metzger appears in Spider-Man: Brand New Day, portrayed by Tramell Tillman. This version is the head of the Department of Damage Control.

== Microbe ==
Microbe

Publication information
- Publisher: Marvel Comics
- First appearance: New Warriors (vol. 3) #1 (August 2005)
- Created by: Skottie Young; Zeb Wells

In-story information
- Alter ego: Zachary Smith Jr.
- Species: Human mutant
- Team affiliations: New Warriors
- Abilities: Ability to sense and communicate with microbes (bacteria and viruses)

Microbe (Zachary Smith Jr.) is a superhero appearing in Marvel Comics. The character, created by Skottie Young and Zeb Wells, first appeared in The New Warriors (vol. 3) #1. He is a mutant with the ability to communicate with germs and other microscopic organisms. He was a member of the New Warriors.

Zachary's father, a prominent medical researcher, thought he had discovered a way to cure previously incurable diseases. Instead, it turned out that Zachary had unknowingly used his mutant power and "talked" the diseases into acting out the results his father wanted. Disgraced, his father disowned Zachary, leaving the teen heartbroken and alone. Out of compassion, Night Thrasher adopted him and began training him to be a superhero, making him a member of the New Warriors.

While tracking a group of escaped supervillains with the New Warriors, Microbe, along with most of the New Warriors, is killed in an explosion caused by Nitro. This event sparks the need for the Superhuman Registration Act and the ensuing Civil War, as well as making the surviving and former New Warriors members the most hated people in the US.

=== Microbe in other media ===
Matthew Moy was set to portray Microbe in New Warriors prior to its cancellation.

== Micromax ==
Micromax

Publication information
- Publisher: Marvel Comics
- First appearance: Excalibur #44 (Dec. 1991)
- Created by: Alan Davis

In-story information
- Alter ego: Scott Wright
- Species: Human Mutant
- Team affiliations: MI-13; Vanguard; Excalibur; R.C.X. MI16
- Notable aliases: Mr. Right
- Abilities: Mass manipulation; Superhuman strength and durability; Limited shapeshifting

Micromax (Scott Wright) is a fictional character, a mutant superhero appearing in American comic books published by Marvel Comics. Micromax was created by Alan Davis and first appeared in Excalibur #44 (Dec. 1991). Micromax has the ability to increase, decrease, or redistribute his body mass, allowing for dramatic size and shape changes.

Prior to the discovery of his mutant abilities, Scott Wright was a disk jockey. With the discovery of his powers he became a special British government operative for M.I.6, a secret British national security unit, under the name Micromax. He had a few run ins with Excalibur, even joining them on some missions. He later resigns from the F.I.6 to join the Brand Corporation in New Jersey.

Micromax retains his mutant powers after M-Day, joining the Office of National Emergency to police the 198. He later joined the mutant nation of Krakoa, where he was eligible for the 2022 X-Men vote, but lost to Firestar.

== Midnight ==
Midnight is the name of several characters appearing in American comic books published by Marvel Comics.

=== Mary McGrill ===
Mary McGrill is a waitress and cook who works at the Short Stop Diner. She operated as Midnight and fought U.S. Archer.

=== Jeff Wilde ===
Midnight (Jeff Wilde) was a partner of Moon Knight. While training his new sidekick, Moon Knight was targeted by the Secret Empire. In an attempt to eliminate Moon Knight for past confrontations with the criminal organization, the Secret Empire seemingly disintegrated Midnight with an energy blast.

Midnight is resurrected, and possesses a cyborg body enhanced with rocket-powered feet, super-extensible arms, super-strength, and laser beams along with a cyborg nurse, Lynn Church. He is believed to be killed a second time in a battle with Moon Knight, Spider-Man, Darkhawk, Punisher, Nova, and Night Thrasher.

He is seen a third time with Lynn Church after a murderous spree to get the attention of Moon Knight again. Moon Knight confronts the two in Mogart's underground lair. Moon Knight grudgingly kills Midnight to let his soul rest.

== Proxima Midnight ==
Proxima Midnight is a supervillain appearing in American comic books published by Marvel Comics. Created by writer Jonathan Hickman, she first appeared in New Avengers #8 (September 2013). She is a prominent member of the Black Order working for Thanos.

Proxima Midnight is a member of Thanos' Black Order and the wife of fellow member Corvus Glaive. Proxima and the rest of the Order are directed to Wakanda to search for the Infinity Gems, but are distracted when Ebony Maw reveals the location of Thane, Thanos' son. Thane wants nothing to do with his father and imprisons him and Proxima in amber.

Namor frees Proxima and Thanos and asks that they join his Cabal due to his own anger towards Earth. However, Namor soon finds himself hating the Cabal's tactics and vows to work with the Illuminati to defeat them. Namor is betrayed, with him and the Cabal being trapped in a universe that is going to be destroyed. They all manage to escape into the Ultimate Marvel universe and vow to get revenge.

Proxima meets with Thanos and a cloaked figure, later revealed to be Hela, and works with Hela in an attempt to retrieve Mjolnir. Ultimately, Proxima and Hela are humiliated and forced to return empty handed. To prove herself worthy, Hela kills Proxima in front of Thanos.

In the storyline "No Surrender", Proxima Midnight is resurrected by the Challenger and battles the Grandmaster's Lethal Legion.

=== Powers and abilities of Proxima Midnight ===
Proxima Midnight possesses the typical attributes of a super powered individual including superhuman strength, speed, endurance and durability.

Midnight wields a spear that was forged from a star, possesses homing properties, and can release fatal toxins. It can also revert to its star form, entangling others in energy.

=== Proxima Midnight in other media ===
==== Television ====
- Proxima Midnight appears in Avengers Assemble, voiced by Kari Wahlgren.
- Proxima Midnight appears in Guardians of the Galaxy, voiced again by Kari Wahlgren. This version is initially a member of the Black Order before joining the Universal Believers.

==== Marvel Cinematic Universe ====
- Proxima Midnight appears in media set in the Marvel Cinematic Universe, with Carrie Coon providing the voice and facial capture while Monique Ganderton provided physical motion capture. This version is the adoptive daughter of Thanos.
  - Proxima Midnight was introduced in Avengers: Infinity War (2018).
  - Proxima Midnight appears in Avengers: Endgame (2019).
  - Proxima Midnight appears in the What If...? episode "What If... T'Challa Became a Star-Lord?" (2021).
- Proxima Midnight appears as a mini-boss and a boss in Marvel Avengers Alliance.
- Proxima Midnight appears as a support character in Marvel Puzzle Quest.
- Proxima Midnight appears as a mini-boss and unlockable playable character in Marvel Contest of Champions.
- Proxima Midnight appears as a boss and unlockable playable character in Marvel Future Fight.
- Proxima Midnight appears as a boss in Marvel Avengers Academy as part of the "Return of A-Force" event.
- Proxima Midnight appears as an unlockable playable character in Lego Marvel Super Heroes 2 via the "Marvel's Avengers: Infinity War Movie Level Pack" DLC.
- Proxima Midnight appears as a playable character in Marvel End Time Arena.
- Proxima Midnight appears as a boss in Marvel Ultimate Alliance 3: The Black Order, voiced again by Kari Wahlgren.
- Proxima Midnight appears as a card in Marvel Snap.

== Midnight Sun ==
Midnight Sun (M'Nai) is a supervillain appearing in American comic books published by Marvel Comics. The character first appeared in Marvel Special Edition #16 (February 1974), and was created by Steve Englehart, Jim Starlin, and Al Milgrom.

Midnight Sun is originally M'Nai, an African child from a village which Zheng Zu uses as his headquarters. After the British Armed Forces attack the village, scarring M'Nai and killing his family, Zu adopts him and raises him alongside his son Shang-Chi, becoming a highly trained martial artist and espionage agent. Taking the identity of "Midnight", M'Nai wears a mask at all times to hide his facial scar. Although he and Shang-Chi sometimes come to blows, they grow up as friends, a relationship which ends when Shang-Chi rebels against Zu.

Midnight continues to work as Zu's agent until he is ordered to assassinate Shang-Chi. Their friendship unravels during the mission, as Midnight mocks Shang-Chi's attempts to convince him to renounce their father's villainy. Midnight proclaims that his past has given him an unending hatred for humanity and renounces his friendship with Shang-Chi. The two battle before Midnight falls to his death.

The Kree obtain Midnight's body and place him in cryogenic storage. Scientist Kar-Sagg transfers Midnight's brain into a clone body which possesses superhuman strength, durability, and agility and is able to survive the conditions of space, and empowers him to battle the Silver Surfer on multiple occasions, propelling himself airborne by using silver discs grafted to his hands and feet. It is later revealed that the Kree removed most of Midnight's memories to make him a more effective fighter and that their alterations to Midnight Sun's body rendered him mute. Midnight Sun regains some of his memories, rebels against the Kree, and is taken to the Inhuman city of Attilan for treatment.

Midnight returns to fight Shang-Chi once more, recognizing him due to residual memories. Unable to speak with Shang-Chi, Midnight Sun communicates via carvings made with circular discs and gives up his grudge against him. He later regains his memories and speech through unknown means and returns to his old costume, giving up his metallic armor and discs.

== Midnight's Fire ==
Midnight's Fire

Publication information
- Publisher: Marvel Comics
- First appearance: The New Warriors #2 (Aug. 1990)
- Created by: Fabian Nicieza (writer); Mark Bagley (artist)

In-story information
- Alter ego: Aaron Chord
- Species: Human Mutant
- Team affiliations: Folding Circle; Ten Rings
- Abilities: His five senses are enhanced Enhanced speed, strength, and agility Sensory perception Expert martial artist

Midnight's Fire is a supervillain appearing in American comic books published by Marvel Comics. He first appeared in The New Warriors #2 (Aug. 1990), and was created by Fabian Nicieza and Mark Bagley. Midnight's Fire is a mutant. His powers and his sister Silhouette's powers are derived from their ability to tap into the extradimensional energy of the Universal Wellspring, due to being descendants of the Dragon's Breath Cult which had based their cult around the base of one of the wells for centuries.

In 1966 during the Vietnam War, an American recon patrol in Cambodia stumbled upon the ancient, hidden temple of the cult Dragon's Breath, which had remained hidden for centuries. It had been built upon a well-spring of raw, primal energy called the "Well of All Things". The inhabitants decided to breed a superior race that would one day unite with the ways of the west. They believed that this union would produce children capable of harnessing the power of the Well. The members of the recon patrol were to be the fathers of these children, one of these men was Andrew Chord the man who would become Midnight Fire's and Silhouette's father.

Midnight's Fire and his sister Silhouette are the only children of Andrew Chord, former guardian of Dwayne Taylor (Night Thrasher) and his wife Miyami (daughter of Tai). Silhouette, Midnight's Fire and Dwayne began an organized effort to take down various New York City street gangs, but their partnership ended when Silhouette was shot and paralyzed from the waist down. Midnight's Fire blamed Dwayne and became a cop killer and a druglord to lure Dwayne into a physical confrontation he could not possibly win.

=== Powers and abilities of Midnight's Fire ===
Midnight's Fire is a mutant like his sister Silhouette. His powers come from the Universal Wellspring. His physical attributes, including his speed, strength, agility, endurance, and sensory perception, are all enhanced to superhuman levels. Midnight's Fire is also a skilled martial artist.

== Milan ==
Milan

Publication information
- Publisher: Marvel Comics
- First appearance: The Uncanny X-Men #300 (1993)
- Created by: Scott Lobdell & John Romita Jr.

In-story information
- Alter ego: Francisco Milan
- Species: Human Mutant
- Team affiliations: Acolytes
- Abilities: Electropathy; Technopathy

Francisco Milan is a character appearing in American comic books published by Marvel Comics. The character was depicted as a member of the Acolytes and he first appeared in The Uncanny X-Men #300.

Milan is a member of the Acolytes, a super-powered team of terrorists who claim to follow the teachings of Magneto. Milan is one of the Acolytes who helped kidnap geneticist Moira MacTaggert. The group keep her in their current headquarters in a facility in France. Milan uses his powers to record various memories off Moira into the Acolyte computer systems. Moira is soon rescued by the heroic X-Men. With the other Acolytes, Milan leaves Fabian Cortez thanks to Exodus, and rejoin Magneto; they appear at Illyana Rasputin's funeral, where they recruit Colossus.

After his home universe is destroyed, Holocaust is taken aboard the space station Avalon, the home base of the Acolytes. After reawakening, Holocaust kills Milan.

Milan can convert brainwaves into electromagnetic emissions and vice versa. This allows him to project his thoughts and communicate with machinery through direct mental interface.

=== Milan in other media ===
Milan makes a non-speaking appearance in the X-Men: The Animated Series episode "Sanctuary".

== Jake Miller ==
Jake Miller is a character appearing in American comic books published by Marvel Comics. The character, created by Jim Starlin and George Perez, first appeared in Infinity Gauntlet #1 (July 1991). He was a thief and killer who was celebrating alongside his friends Bambi Long and Ralph Bunker by driving drunk, killing all three.

=== Alternate versions ===
The Ultimate Marvel version of Jake Miller prevented a nuclear power plant's catastrophe. After his family is killed by Hydra agents, Miller utilizes vibranium technology in a bid to get revenge on the United States, but he is stopped by the Ultimates.

== Mimir ==
Mimir first appeared in The Mighty Thor #240 (October 1975), and was created by Roy Thomas, Bill Mantlo and Sal Buscema. Mimir was a child of Buri and uncle of Odin. He was a former opponent of Odin whom Odin transformed into a fiery being. He now dwells in the Well of Wisdom in Asgard. Odin sacrificed his right eye to Mimir for the wisdom to forestall Ragnarök. Mimir is a virtually omniscient being with precognitive abilities. Thor travels to Hildstalf, to seek out the wisdom of the Well of Mimir. Mimir was apparently killed in the destruction of Asgard at the hands of Thor.

== Mindworm ==
- First appearance: The Amazing Spider-Man #138 (November 1974)
- Created by: Gerry Conway and Ross Andru
- Species: Mutant
- Abilities: Telepathy
- Further reading: Mindworm at the Comic Book DB (archived from the original); Mindworm at the Grand Comics Database

Mindworm first appeared in The Amazing Spider-Man #138 by Gerry Conway and Ross Andru. William Turner was a superhuman mutant with limited telepathic powers. He had an oversized cranium and was extremely intelligent who started off using his powers for crime due to the tragedy of his parents' death using his powers against Spider-Man.

Eventually, Mindworm attempted to reform but his problems were too difficult for him to control and he allowed himself to be killed by common street thugs to end his suffering.

== Mink ==
Mink is a character appearing in American comic books published by Marvel Comics. She is a pastiche of Catwoman.

Mink is a former criminal, who became a part of Nighthawk's America Redeemers, who attempted to stop the Squadron from taking over the world. She was an heiress who turned to a life of crime for excitement. She fell in love with Nighthawk, but he was killed when Squadron infiltrator Foxfire used her powers to rot Nighthawk's heart. Mink then killed Foxfire with her claws.

Mink has no superhuman powers, but is highly acrobatic and skilled in martial arts. She wields metal claws and Mink-stink, or mustard gas.

== Tai Miranda ==
Taina "Tai" Miranda is a character appearing in American comic books published by Marvel Comics. The character, created by Jeremy Whitley and Elsa Charretier, first appeared in The Unstoppable Wasp #2 (February 2017).

== Miss Patriot ==
Miss Patriot (Mary Morgan) is a Timely Comics Golden Age superhero who is the Patriot's sidekick after being taken captive by Dr. Groitzig and Signore Scharrolla who use her as a test subject for super-soldier serum.

She first appeared as the Patriot's companion in Human Torch Comics #4-5 (Spring/Summer 1941) as Mary Morgan. Mary and the Patriot then appeared in Marvel Mystery Comics #21 (July 1941). Mary appeared sporadically, and took on the Miss Patriot mantle in Marvel Mystery Comics #50 (December 1943). She continued to appear on and off until Marvel Mystery Comics #73 (June 1946).

== Miss Sinister ==
Miss Sinister (Claudine Renko) is a former test subject who was implanted with Mister Sinister's consciousness as a failsafe, transforming her body to resemble Sinister. Although she gains some of Sinister's memories and his knowledge of science, Renko's personality remains intact and resists Sinister's personality. Seeing herself as a different person rather than a host or a clone, Renko takes the name Miss Sinister.

Miss Sinister is next seen in the company of the reality-displaced X-Men of a now-dead universe and also formed the New Marauders from other displaced mutants from Earth-1610. One member of this team, Jimmy Hudson, has a genetic anomaly that could enable Renko to create and control spontaneous mutation. Over the following months, Renko further researches this anomaly, calling it Mothervine, for the purpose of controlling mutant childbirths, causing further evolution in natural-born mutants, and triggering mutation in non-mutants. Though she realizes the secondary and primary mutations caused by such tampering are debilitating to the point of being lethal, Renko works with Bastion, Emma Frost, and Havok to unleash Mothervine on a global scale.

Mothervine bombs containing the catalyst are launched into a dozen major American cities resulting in the emergence of primary mutations in people who did not possess the X-Gene, as well as the appearance of secondary and tertiary enhancements in mutants. The time-displaced X-Men attack, but are quickly defeated and captured. Seeing the damage done by Mothervine and realizing all mutants may become enslaved to Miss Sinister, Emma Frost telepathically forces the New Marauders to fight Renko. Miss Sinister activates genetic implants in the New Marauders, killing them instantly. Frost frees Jimmy Hudson from his metal restraints, and he seemingly kills Miss Sinister. The effects of Mothervine are contained and reversed by Magneto and Elixir.

== Mist Mistress ==
Mist Mistress made her first appearance in Captain America #346. Her mutant power is the ability to spread a chemical agent that turns to acid or anesthetic and can also use her mental powers to guide it where she wants and dissolve solid objects.

As part of the Resistants, she participates in the rescue of Mentallo from a vehicle conveying him to the superhuman prison the Vault. Mist Mistress personally melts part of the vehicle and the armor of a Guardsman found inside. Mentallo is taken to the Resistants' Death Valley hideout and officially joins the group.

Mist Mistress was among the mutants who lost their powers after M-Day.

== Mister E ==
Mister E (Victor Goldstein, also known as Victor Jay) is a character appearing in American comic books published by Marvel Comics. The character was a Timely Comics Golden Age superhero, a wealthy businessman by day turned masked vigilante by night. He appeared in Daring Mystery Comics #2 (February 1940), and reappears in 2008 in The Twelve. His only story has been reprinted in The Twelve #1/2.

== Mister Justice ==
Mr. Justice (Timothy Carney) is a superhero and a member of the superhero team called the First Line. He was created by Roger Stern and John Byrne, and first appeared in Marvel: The Lost Generation #12. He was the younger brother of Yankee Clipper.

Mr. Justice was, in his teenage years, recruited into the First Line. He was at this time known as Kid Justice. He was highly influenced by his brother during their partnership, and once when faced with a difficulty, he asked himself "what would Clipper do?" He had several times been saved by Nightingale and Yankee Clipper. He has also been cited by teammates as the living legacy of Yankee Clipper after Clipper's disappearing in Marvel: The Lost Generation #4. Mr. Justice seemingly died in Marvel: The Lost Generation #12, along with most of the First Line group members while battling a Skrull fleetship.

== Mister One and Mister Two ==
Mister One and Mister Two are symbiotic entities who were initially assumed to be mutants. One body is tiny and helpless and the other is gigantic and possesses superhuman strength. For a time ,they are cared for by Joe Keegan, who had found them. Keegan realizes they are too much for him and attempts to advertise for a better caretaker. In a later incident, both are killed in a battle with Magneto and the Brotherhood of Mutants/Mutant Force.

Long after their death, it is revealed that Mister One and Mister Two were not mutants. Rather, they were Shi'ar Subguardians, prototypes for what would become Imperial Guard member Warstar.

== Mistress Love ==
Mistress Love is a cosmic entity associated with the concept of love.

== Robert Mitchell ==
Robert Mitchell is a character appearing in American comic books related to Marvel Comics. The character, created by John Rozum and Stephen Jones, first appeared in Over the Edge #7 (March 1996).

Robert Mitchell was the boyfriend of Sally Slavinski. Robert was killed by demons connected to his girlfriend's abusive ex-boyfriend.

=== Ultimate Marvel version ===
The Ultimate Marvel of Robert Mitchell is a young African American prodigy who was arrested for trying to build an antimatter generator, but gets recruited and given superpowers as the Vision.

== Mogul of the Mystic Mountain ==
Mogul of the Mystic Mountain first appeared in Thor #137 (February 1967), and was created by Stan Lee and Jack Kirby. He is the evil ruler of Zanadu the Mystic Mountain in Skornheim, a land in Asgard. Mogul commands a powerful "Jinni Devil" and other mystical beings. Mogul long ago conquered the land that was home to Hogun. Thousands perished in his coup and under his tyranny, as Mogul laid waste to the land. Hogun escaped with his fathers and brothers, who dedicated their lives to finding the Mystic Mountain, Mogul's home; Hogun's relatives perished seeking the Mountain. His powers include teleportation, matter rearrangement and illusion casting.

== Mole ==
Mole is a mole-like member of the Morlocks, many of whom were slaughtered during the events of Mutant Massacre by the Marauders. Mole, along with his friend Chickenwings, left the Morlocks' "Alley" after the Massacre. They survived and subsisted as homeless men in the streets of New York City until Sabretooth decided to hunt down the survivors of the Massacre. He stalked and attacked the pair and killed Chickenwings, giving Mole enough of a lead to escape using his burrowing ability.

Mole established a temporary hiding place in the basement of Acme Records. An employee, Opal Tanaka, discovered him and felt sympathy for him, allowing him to hide there and bringing him food and clothing. Soon after this, Opal began dating Bobby Drake (Iceman). Jealous of Opal's interest in Drake, as well as fearing that Drake may be seeking to harm her, Mole followed the two on their date. Mole grew angry as he watched Opal and Drake interact and inadvertently disintegrated a portion of a crane which dropped on the two. Drake fought back, believing it to be an attack from an evil mutant, but Opal stopped the fight as soon as she recognized Mole. The two explained their relationship to Mole. Mole felt sorry for himself and returned to the Morlock tunnels, where Sabretooth was waiting for him.

It is later revealed that Mole survived his encounter with Sabretooth by tunneling to safety. He becomes an inhabitant of Krakoa when it is established as a mutant nation.

=== Mole in other media ===
Mole makes non-speaking appearances in X-Men: The Animated Series.

== Marcus Momplaisir ==
Marcus Momplaisir is an employee of the Beyond Corporation. He helped secure Janine Godbe's release from prison as part of the Beyond Corporation's plans to manipulate Ben Reilly into being loyal to them.

== Mondo ==
Mondo is the name of two characters which have appeared in the series Generation X. The first Mondo was a superhero and the second Mondo was revealed to be a clone of the supervillain Mondo, who appeared years later. The first Mondo debuted in Generation X #3 (November, 1994).

=== First Mondo ===
Mondo is originally from Samoa and was once friends with Cordelia Frost, Emma Frost's younger sister. In an attempt to make a bid for the position of White Queen of the Hellfire Club, Cordelia had Mondo contained and handed him over to the Inner Circle of the Hellfire Club. Cordelia's scheme backfired; the Hellfire Club kept Mondo but denied Cordelia membership. Cordelia went to Emma, headmistress of the Massachusetts Academy, for help and, soon after, Mondo was rescued by Generation X and subsequently accepted an invitation to join the school.

Later, the real Mondo appeared alongside Black Tom and Juggernaut. Completely loyal to Black Tom, the real Mondo battled the members of Generation X. Generation X attempted to talk to Mondo into not fighting, but Mondo laughed at them, reminding them that he has never met them before. Generation X and their teachers were able to defeat their opponents, but the trio still managed to escape.

Mondo is capable of taking on the properties of any organic or inorganic material with which he comes into contact. When using his power, Mondo is able to grow in mass with an assumed proportionate growth in strength to superhuman levels.Mondo can absorb matter into his body, gaining the mass, appearance, and other properties of the matter in question. This change will remain until Mondo's body "digests" the organic matter, which is then disintegrated. Mondo is also able to use his power to travel through organic matter, such as dirt, and can appear instantaneously in the immediate vicinity of where he entered the earth.

=== Clone of Mondo ===
After rescuing what they thought was Mondo, Generation X learned that the Mondo they had rescued was a plant-based clone created by Black Tom Cassidy who had infiltrated the Hellfire Club and rescued Mondo. After taking Mondo under his wing, Black Tom created a clone of him to infiltrate the Massachusetts Academy so that Black Tom could exact vengeance on his cousin, Banshee, who was the headmaster of the academy.

As Banshee and Emma Frost battled Black Tom, the Mondo clone began hunting down the members of Generation X. As the Mondo clone was about to attack Jubilee, he was killed by Bastion.

=== Mondo in other media ===
Mondo appears in Generation X, portrayed by Bumper Robinson. This version is American and a student at Xavier's School for Gifted Youngsters.

== Monkey Joe ==
Monkey Joe is a fictional squirrel appearing in American comic books published by Marvel Comics. The character, created by Steve Ditko and Will Murray, first appeared in Marvel Super-Heroes (vol. 2) #8 (November 1991).

Monkey Joe was the first squirrel with whom Doreen Green communicated when she was ten years old. They became friends after Doreen saved Joe from being chased by a dog, and he encouraged Doreen to use her powers to help people.

The duo later join the Great Lakes Avengers, during which Monkey Joe is killed by Leather Boy. After his death, Squirrel Girl finds a new squirrel companion named Tippy-Toe.

=== Monkey Joe in other media ===
Monkey Joe appears in Ultimate Spider-Man.

== Alison Mongrain ==
Alison Mongrain was a recurring character in The Amazing Spider-Man comic books during the latter half of the Clone Saga. She served as an agent of Norman Osborn, who had returned to North America to personally finish off Peter Parker and destroy everything he had held dear, which included his unborn child May Parker. In the final storyline of the Clone Saga, "Revelations", Mongrain's task was to poison Mary Jane Watson, forcing her into premature labor.

In the alternate universe of the MC2 Spider-Girl title, Mongrain was tracked down by Peter's first clone Kaine, who rescued May from her grip and returned her to Peter and Mary Jane. Having bonded with May whilst keeping her prisoner, Alison returns sometime later with the intent of killing Normie Osborn whose brief tenure as the Green Goblin convince her that he would harm the child that she grew attached to. Spider-Girl, having been informed of her intents by Kaine, reassured Mongrain that the child is safe by unmasking herself.

== Albert Moon ==
Albert Moon is the name of two characters appearing in American comic books published by Marvel Comics. Both individuals are relatives of Cindy Moon / Silk.

=== Albert Moon Jr. ===
Albert Moon Jr. is the brother of Cindy Moon. After becoming estranged from his family, he took up the alias of James Park and was briefly a member of the Goblin Nation.

=== Albert Moon Sr. ===
Albert Moon Sr. is a scientist who is the father of Cindy Moon and Albert Moon Jr.

=== Albert Moon in other media ===
Albert Moon Sr. appears in Marvel's Spider-Man 2, voiced by Tom Choi.

== Nari Moon ==
Nari Moon is a scientist who is the wife of Albert Moon Sr. and the mother of Cindy Moon and Albert Moon Jr.

== Moondark ==
Moondark is a character appearing in American comic books published by Marvel Comics.

Moondark operated as a stage magician in San Francisco, and when Spider-Man came to town he feared that Spider-Man would interfere with his plans. While Jack Russell observed his performance at a small bijou, Moondark mesmerized the whole audience including Jack (also known as the Werewolf). Moondark sent the Werewolf to ambush Spider-Man at the San Francisco Bay, where he was vacationing. As the two heroes fought, Spider-Man discovered and tackled Moondark, who was killed as he fell into the water.

The Dark Beings whom Moondark worshipped claimed his soul but allowed him to return to Earth to claim other souls and buy back his own. He acted as a stage performer at a carnival in New York and created a Soul-Orb to claim the souls of the other carnival performers one by one. The Ghost Rider, Johnny Blaze, while working at the carnival also lost his soul to Moondark, which Moondark kept in a ring he wore. Spider-Man, as Peter Parker, went to the carnival and recognized the Ghost Rider who was now a part of Moondark's show. Parker returned as Spider-Man, but was captured by the Ghost Rider and the others under Moondark's control. When Moondark tried to steal Spider-Man's soul, he was able to destroy Moondark's ring and free the Ghost Rider, who destroyed the Soul-Orb with a burst of hellfire. Moondark's demonic master arrived to take the only soul available—Moondark's.

Moondark was able to return to the living world, seeking to reclaim Blaze's soul to bargain for his own. Lairing outside Las Vegas, he sent mutated vultures to attack Blaze and attract his attention. He tricked Ghost Rider into resuming human form, subdued him and bound him with magical bonds that prevented him from transforming. Hamilton Slade, then known as the Phantom Rider, was nearby and drawn to the magical conflict. When Moondark attacked Slade, his concentration weakened which allowed Blaze to break free and transform into Ghost Rider again. Ghost Rider destroyed the new Soul-Orb and Moondark fled to his other-dimensional realm.

Moondark joined forces with the Water Wizard to get revenge on Blaze. Moondark enhanced the Water Wizard's power which allowed him to overpower Ghost Rider, and Moondark appeared and mocked the seemingly helpless Ghost Rider. Ghost Rider set Moondark's body on fire, and he fled back to his dimension.

== Moonhunter ==
Moonhunter is a character in the Marvel Universe. He was created by Mark Gruenwald and Rik Levins, and first appeared in Captain America #402 (July 1992). Zach Moonhunter once worked as a werewolf wrangler under Dredmund the Druid's mental control. He first encountered Captain America outside Starkesboro, Massachusetts. He fought Captain America, and captured him. Zach Moonhunter is an athletic man with no superhuman powers, though he is an excellent hand-to-hand combatant and a highly accomplished pilot. As a werewolf hunter, Moonhunter wore a mask and body armor that were both silver-plated for protection against werewolves. The mask was surmounted by a "wig" composed of sharp, jagged strands of silver. He carried guns that fired silver bullets, which can kill werewolves. He wore gauntlets that fired silver darts which could harm werewolves or drug-tipped darts that could induce unconsciousness in human beings. He used a whip with a silver tip that could cause werewolves pain. He used a rope coated with silver as a lasso for capturing werewolves. His body armor was equipped with artificial claws he could use for help in scaling walls. As the Druid's operative, he piloted a two-man jet-powered sky-cycle. Afterwards, he reformed, and forsaking his werewolf-fighting costume, became Captain America's personal pilot for the remainder Gruenwald's run on Cap's title (issue 444).

== Moonstone ==
Moonstone is the name of two characters appearing in American comic books published by Marvel Comics.

== Alisande Morales ==
Alisande "Ali" Morales is a character appearing in American comic books published by Marvel Comics. The character first appeared in Captain America and Falcon #1 (March 2004), and was created by Christopher Priest and Bart Sears.

Morales is an agent of S.H.I.E.L.D. who assisted Captain America, Falcon, Iron Man and Hank Pym against various supervillains, such as the Anti-Cap and MODOK. Morales also went after X-23, but quit due to realizing how amoral both H.A.M.M.E.R. and Kimura are.

=== Alisande Morales in other media ===
- An alternate universe version of Alisande Morales appears in the What If...? episode "What If... the Red Guardian Stopped the Winter Soldier?", voiced by America Ferrera.
- Alisande Morales appears in Marvel's Avengers, voiced by Elysia Rotaru.

== Billie Morales ==
Billie Morales is Miles Morales's younger sister.

=== Billie Morales in other media ===
Billie Morales appears in Spidey and His Amazing Friends, voiced by Kayleigh Rayne.

== Gloria Morales ==
Gloria Morales is a character appearing in American comic books published by Marvel Comics. The character first appeared in Spider-Man vol. 2 #2 (March 2016), and was created by Brian Michael Bendis and Sara Pichelli. She is the mother of Rio Morales and the grandmother of Miles Morales.

=== Gloria Morales in other media ===
Gloria Morales appears in the Spidey and His Amazing Friends episode "Halted Holidays", voiced by Sophia Ramos.

== Rio Morales ==
- Further reading: Rio Morales at the Comic Book DB (archived from the original); Rio Morales at the Grand Comics Database

Rio Morales is a character appearing in American comic books published by Marvel Comics. Created by writer Brian Michael Bendis and artist Sara Pichelli, she first appeared in Ultimate Comics Spider-Man (vol. 2) #1 (November 2011), which is set in the alternate reality of the Ultimate Marvel imprint. She is the mother of Miles Morales / Spider-Man and the wife of Jefferson Davis.

Rio is an Afro-Puerto Rican woman. She works as a Hospital Operations Administrator at Brooklyn General Hospital. While Jefferson distrusts superheroes, Rio holds a positive view of them in general and of the new Spider-Man in particular. When Conrad Marcus attacks Jefferson, Spider-Man confronts and defeats Venom while Rio learns that Miles is Spider-Man, but is fatally wounded by police gunfire. She expresses pride in Miles before dying, and tells her son not to tell Jefferson about this. Rio's death made Miles take a one-year sabbatical as Spider-Man. After the events of the 2015 "Secret Wars" storyline, Molecule Man repays Miles' help by transferring the Morales family to the mainstream Marvel Universe, resurrecting Rio in the process. Jefferson is aware of Miles's double life, but Rio is initially not. She later learns the truth and struggles with it before eventually supporting her son's vigilante activities. She later gives birth to a daughter named Billie Morales.

=== Rio Morales in other media ===
- Rio Morales appears in Ultimate Spider-Man, voiced by Maria Canals-Barrera. This version is a widow who has a healthy and supportive mother-son relationship with Miles Morales / Kid Arachnid.
- Rio Morales appears in Spidey and His Amazing Friends, voiced by Gabrielle Ruiz.
- Rio Morales appears in Spider-Man: Into the Spider-Verse, Spider-Man: Across the Spider-Verse, and Spider-Man: Beyond the Spider-Verse, voiced by Luna Lauren Vélez.
- Rio Morales appears in Insomniac Games' Spider-Man series, voiced by Jacqueline Pinol. This version is initially a middle school science teacher.
  - In Marvel's Spider-Man, she plays a minor role, becoming a widow after Jefferson is killed during Mister Negative's attack on City Hall. She later helps Miles cope by getting him a job at F.E.A.S.T. with help from Peter Parker and May Parker as an alternative to more therapy. She also attends May's funeral, and helps Miles and Dr. Morgan Michaels distribute vaccines for the Devil's Breath virus.
  - In Marvel's Spider-Man: Miles Morales, Rio and Miles move from Brooklyn to Rio's childhood home in Harlem after her mother retires to Puerto Rico. Additionally, Rio campaigns for a position in the city council in the midst of a violent conflict between Roxxon and the Underground. She later discovers her son's activities as Spider-Man, which she supports, and helps evacuate Harlem during the Tinkerer's revenge plot against Roxxon. Following this, she is successfully elected city councilwoman.
  - In Marvel's Spider-Man 2, Rio attempts to help Miles as he struggles to apply for college and considers pursuing revenge against Mister Negative. Additionally, she has forgiven Aaron Davis for his past and helped him gain an apartment above her and Miles. She also began dating Albert Moon, the father of Cindy Moon, whom she later introduces to Miles.

== Melissa Morbeck ==
Melissa Morbeck is a character appearing in American comic books published by Marvel Comics. She is an entrepreneur and the arch-nemesis of Squirrel Girl. The character, created by Ryan North and Erica Henderson, first appeared in The Unbeatable Squirrel Girl Vol. 2 #17 (February 2017).

Melissa Morbeck comes from a long line of women who were obsessed with wanting to control animals. After having become a successful engineering entrepreneur, she went about amassing an army of animals from every zoo and animal shelter by selling them tracking chips. After having witnessed the exploits of Squirrel Girl, Chipmunk Hunk, and Koi Boi, she manipulated the three into meeting each other and then attempted to turn Squirrel Girl into her protege by giving her enhanced equipment. Squirrel Girl's friend, Nancy Whitehead, deduced that Morbeck was a supervillain trying to amass an animal army and she revealed her true colors. The heroes eventually defeated Morbeck who was taken to prison after she pitifully tried to claim that Squirrel Girl was the villain. While in prison, she was visited by Ratatoskr who offers an alliance.

Morbeck plotted her revenge on Squirrel Girl, somehow recruiting major villains such as Taskmaster, MODOK, Dormammu, and her idol Doctor Doom. She also outed her identity as Doreen Green and blew up her apartment, though luckily no one was injured. To make matters worse, Morbeck also managed to hack Tony Stark's suit and took the name Iron Ring, a name that Squirrel Girl admitted was cool, but hated that Morbeck was the one to use it. A giant battle in Central Park took place with numerous heroes and villains showing up from both sides. The battle finally ended when Galactus, who previously formed a friendship with Squirrel Girl, showed up and sent all the villains to prison, Morbeck included.

== David Moreau ==
David Moreau is a character appearing in American comic books published by Marvel Comics. The character's name is an homage to the title character of H.G. Wells' science-fiction novel The Island of Doctor Moreau.

While working for the island nation of Genosha, he developed a mind control device which made mutant slavery possible. Moreau created the mutate-process: all inhabitants of Genosha were tested at their 13th birthday for any presence of the X-factor gene. If they tested positive, they were turned into mutates: their memories were erased and their personality changed to become completely obedient, they were sealed in special suits and their powers were genetically changed to serve the needs of their country. At this time, Moreau became known as the Genegineer (a portmanteau of "Genetic Engineer").

Christian Davenport remarked that the atrocities committed by David Moreau are repeatedly related to the Holocaust and American slavery in the Genosha series of comics.

== Miles Morhames ==
Miles Morhames is a pig version of Miles Morales.

== Maris Morlak ==
Maris Morlak is a scientist who is a member of the Enclave.

=== Maris Morlak in other media ===
Maris Morlak appears in Moon Girl and Devil Dinosaur, voiced by Wesley Snipes. This version was a co-worker of Miriam "Mimi" Lafayette. The two previously collaborated to create a portal generator until Miriam turned against Enclave. Years later, Morlak leads the Enclave in going after Miriam. When the portal generator overloads and forms a wormhole, Morlak is sucked in despite Miriam's attempts to save him.

== Morph ==
Morph is the name of two characters appearing in American comic books published by Marvel Comics.

=== Benjamin Deeds ===
Morph (Benjamin Deeds) is a mutant character created by Brian Bendis and Stuart Immonen. Morph first appeared in All-New X-Men #3 (December, 2012). Benjamin has the power to alter his appearance to closely resemble those around him, while also using chemical influence to make the target trust him more.

Benjamin has been a member of the second incarnation of Generation X led by Jubilee. He was in a relationship with fellow member Hindsight.

== Morrat ==
Morrat is a Skrull warlord. After Super-Skrull posing as Franklin Storm as Invincible Man was defeated by the Fantastic Four, Morrat had a concussion device strapped to the real Franklin Storm and teleported him back to Earth so that it would activate the moment he saw the Fantastic Four.

At a time when the Fantastic Four had been depowered, Morrat, Princess Anelle, and the Skrulls that were hunting them captured the Fantastic Four. He planned to use them in his plans to overthrow Emperor Dorrek VII. After the Fantastic Four regained their powers, Dorrek showed up with his soldiers upon finding out about Morrat's plot. He stripped Morrat of his rank and ordered his men to execute him. When Anelle jumped in front of Morrat, Invisible Woman saved her with the laser attack rebounding off her forcefield and killing Morrat.

=== Morrat in other media ===
- Morrat appears in The Fantastic Four episode "Behold, a Distant Star", voiced by Tol Avery.
- Morrat appears in the Fantastic Four (1994) episode "Behold, A Distant Star", voiced by Dan Gilvezan.

== Eli Morrow ==
- Further reading: Eli Morrow at the Comic Book DB (archived from the original); Eli Morrow at the Grand Comics Database

Elias W. "Eli" Morrow is a character in the Marvel Universe. The character, created by Felipe Smith and Tradd Moore, first appeared in All-New Ghost Rider #1 (May 2014).

Eli Morrow was a Satan-worshiping serial killer who worked for the Russian mafia. He was considered the black sheep of his family and shoved Robbie Reyes' mother down a flight of stairs while she was pregnant, resulting in Robbie's younger brother Gabe being born paraplegic. He was killed by the mob, but his spirit possessed a 1969 Dodge Charger, which Robbie later inherited. After Robbie is gunned down by men hired by Calvin Zabo, Morrow attaches himself to Robbie's soul, becoming the new Ghost Rider.

Eli slowly begins to corrupt Robbie in an attempt to turn him into a killer, even going so far as to possess Gabe to fulfill his revenge against the mob boss that killed him. Robbie eventually accepts his uncle's influence and his dual identity as Ghost Rider under the condition that they only target bad people.

=== Eli Morrow in other media ===
- Eli Morrow appears in the fourth season of Agents of S.H.I.E.L.D., portrayed by José Zúñiga. This version is an engineer who worked for Momentum Labs as part of a project to develop a machine that can generate materials out of nothing. The head scientists, Joseph and Lucy Bauer, used an ancient book called the Darkhold to make their dream a reality. However, Morrow discovered this and tried to claim the Darkhold for himself, but failed to when the experiment went awry, turning Lucy and her team into ghosts while Morrow was sent to jail for beating Joseph into a coma after the latter refused to relinquish the book. In the episode "The Good Samaritan", Morrow reveals his true intentions regarding the Darkhold and activates Momentum Labs' machine, gaining the ability to create matter by pulling energy from other dimensions. In "The Laws of Inferno Dynamics", Morrow creates a demon core to enhance himself, but S.H.I.E.L.D. and Robbie stop him, with the latter dragging Morrow into another dimension.
- Eli Morrow appears in Marvel Tokon: Fighting Souls, voiced by Fred Tatasciore.

== Mortis ==
Mortis (Lois London) is a supervillain appearing in Marvel Comics. Lois London was first introduced in Dazzler #21 (July 1982) and was created by Danny Fingeroth and Frank Springer. Lois is the half-sister of the superhero Dazzler and a mutant with the ability to disintegrate inorganic matter and cause living things to die.

Lois London was born Lois Brown to Katherine Blaire and Nick Brown. Her mother would change both their names and leave Nick due to his abusive behavior. She later found out about her half-sister Alison, meeting with her and quickly bonding. When Lois' mutation emerged and she killed a man attempting to assault her, she turned to Alison and they decided to leave and travel the road. They were tailed and blackmailed by an agent of Lois' father, who attempted to get Lois to kill Nick. When this plan was foiled, Alison and Lois lived with Nick for a time.

Nick would later put Alison in danger to generate publicity for her career, causing her to leave Lois behind with her abusive father. In an attack on Lois, her power would emerge again, killing him. Selene comforted Lois and recruited her to her inner circle; Lois took the alias Mortis. During the events of Necrosha, Mortis killed Diamond Lil and confronted her sister, only to realize their powers had no effect on each other. After Selene's defeat and wounding by Wolfsbane, Blink teleported Mortis away. Mortis would return to attack Dazzler, but was defeated and placed into a psychic coma by Psylocke to rehabilitate her.

== Mother Night ==
Mother Night

Publication information
- Publisher: Marvel Comics
- First appearance: Captain America #123 (Mar 1970)
- Created by: Stan Lee and Gene Colan

In-story information
- Alter ego: Susan Scarbo
- Species: Human
- Team affiliations: Skeleton Crew; Sisters of Sin
- Notable aliases: Suprema
- Abilities: Illusions, hypnosis, martial arts, can project dark light to vanish into shadows, and possesses a necklace that emits a mind-subverting gas

Mother Night (Susan Scarbo) is a supervillain appearing in American comic books published by Marvel Comics. Mother Night first appeared in Captain America #123 (March 1970), and was created by Stan Lee and Gene Colan.

Susan Scarbo was born in Teaneck, New Jersey. Susan and her brother, Melvin Scarbo, formed a sibling hypnosis stage act for profit. They quickly became professional criminals, hypnotizing innocent people into doing their bidding. Under the name Suprema, Susan soon attracted the attention of the Red Skull who hired Susan as a nanny for his daughter, Synthia Schmidt. Under Susan's tutelage, Synthia later became Sin.

After a successful infiltration of the original S.H.I.E.L.D. organization and an attempt at stealing a Wolverine Jet from them, Suprema became an enemy of Captain America. After some time, Susan was revealed as an aide to the Red Skull, and his daughter Sin's tutor, nanny, and instructor.

She and her team were eventually killed by the Winter Soldier.

== Mountjoy ==
Mountjoy is a mutant supervillain originating from Bishop's future. The character debuted in Bishop (Vol. 1) #1 (October 1994) by John Ostrander and Carlos Pacheco. He has the ability to possess the bodies of others.

Mountjoy originates from Bishop's future, but travels back in time while possessing Bantam. He faces Bishop in the past multiple times, and infiltrates the Hellfire Club as Scribe. He and Scribe are later separated by Madelyne Pryor.

== Moving Shadow ==
Moving Shadow is a character appearing in Marvel Comics. Created by Doug Moench and Paul Gulacy, he first appeared in the MAX comics imprint Shang-Chi: Master of Kung Fu (November 2002). He is the supervillain half-brother of Shang-Chi.

Moving Shadow was born to the criminal mastermind Zheng Zu and raised in secrecy while highly trained in martial arts and assassination. After Shang-Chi's defection from his criminal organization, Zheng Zu groomed Moving Shadow to replace him. Under Zheng Zu's tutelage, Moving Shadow embraced his father's teachings and served him loyally without question. To ensure the success of his Hellfire weapon, Zheng Zu dispatched Moving Shadow to kill Shang-Chi and his allies Black Jack Tarr, Clive Reston and Leiko Wu. Eager to prove himself superior to his half-brother, Moving Shadow repeatedly clashed with Shang-Chi, who was previously unaware of his existence. Shang-Chi eventually emerged victorious after a vicious fight with Moving Shadow but refused to kill him. With his plains thwarted once again by Shang-Chi, an enraged Zheng Zu executed Moving Shadow for his failure.

Much like his half-brother Shang-Chi, Moving Shadow is a highly skilled martial artist and assassin. He is shown to be proficient in many forms of weaponry, including the jian.

== Alyssa Moy ==
Alyssa Moy

Publication information
- Publisher: Marvel Comics
- First appearance: Fantastic Four vol. 3 #5 (May 1998)
- Created by: Chris Claremont; Salvador Larroca

In-story information
- Alter ego: Alyssa Moy-Castle
- Species: Human
- Team affiliations: Fantastic Four; Shadow Hunters
- Notable aliases: Unrevealed
- Abilities: Genius-level intellect

Alyssa Moy is a character appearing in American comic books published by Marvel Comics. A former lover and colleague of Reed Richards, Alyssa works as a scientist and has a genius-level intellect nearly equal to that of Reed. In some storylines, she acts as the de facto manager for the Fantastic Four, responsible for generating their aliases and visual identities. She first appeared in Fantastic Four vol. 3 #5 (May 1998), created by Chris Claremont and Salvador Larroca.

At some time in the far past, Reed Richards had proposed to Moy. Moy turned him down because she felt that they had a 'duty' to spread their genius-level genes as widely as possible rather than 'confine' themselves to each other. Reed did not reveal this to his wife Sue until some time after Moy had re-entered his life. According to Fantastic Four writer Mark Millar, Moy would play a further role in the comic as he explores her relationship with Reed Richards in much more depth. Millar said: "It just always struck me that Reed would have had someone prior to Sue, since he is ten years older than she is. Also, Sue's so different from Reed and I felt the girl out there would be much more like he was, a female Reed Richards of sorts, and someone he'd have met at university. As luck would have it, Chris Claremont created exactly such a character and her name is Alyssa Moy. Her nickname in our story is Mrs. Fantastic and you'll see why when you read the first issue."

== Ms. Thing ==
- Further reading: Ms. Thing at the Comic Book DB (archived from the original); Ms. Thing at the Grand Comics Database

Ms. Thing (Darla Deering) is a famous celebrity in Marvel Comics. The character, created by Matt Fraction and Mike Allred, first appeared in Marvel NOW! Point One #1 (December 2012).

Darla Deering was a pop music star who dated Johnny Storm. When Reed Richards announced that he and the Fantastic Four were going to travel through space and time, Richards told the other members to find suitable replacements in the case that they do not return after four minutes. She along with Ant-Man (Scott Lang), She-Hulk, and Medusa were chosen. She was given an artificial Thing suit and dubbed herself Ms. Thing. During her time with the Fantastic Four she began to date Scott Lang, but the relationship dissolved when Scott's daughter Cassie was revived. She later attacked Scott in her Ms. Thing armor only for the two to team up to battle Magician. Afterwards, it is revealed that Darla hired him through the Hench App for her new TV show. Ms. Thing teams up with Scott again to rescue Cassie from Darren Cross; their relationship still uneasy. When Scott is in prison, Darla visits him and it appears that the two wish to resume a relationship.

Darla possess an artificial suit that resembles the body of, and imitates the strength of, Ben Grimm. The suit is also self-contained into a pair of rings that immediately form the suit when Darla puts them together and chants "Thing ring, do your thing!".

== Mud-Thing ==
Mud-Thing is a character appearing in American comic books published by Marvel Comics.

Mud-Thing was the result of Sandman and Hydro-Man accidentally merging after falling off the dock during a fight with Spider-Man and their fight over their mutual crush Sadie Frickert.

== Multitude ==
Multitude is a character appearing in American comic books published by Marvel Comics.

Ward is a robot who was saved from human supremacists at the diner Marvel Gas by a cyborg named John Cray. When the Sapien League attacked them at another diner called Route 66 Burger after being tipped off by the human supremacists, Ward found himself bound to the Soul Infinity Stone after John was wounded by them. After knocking them out, he fought to maintain control when Iron Man and Captain America arrived to investigate the attack. Ward regained control and left so that Iron Man and Captain America can get John to the hospital.

== James Murch ==
James Murch is a character appearing in American comic books published by Marvel Comics. The character, created by Joe Casey and Scott Kolins, first appeared in Avengers: Earth's Mightiest Heroes #1 (November 2004). He was a government liaison to the Avengers. Murch communicated with Iron Man while being condescending about the Hulk and Thor as superpowered individuals, Captain America and Hawkeye as independent thinkers, and the Scarlet Witch and Quicksilver as mutants. Murch retired as a husband and father before he is killed for information.

== Muramasa ==
Muramasa is a character appearing in American comic books published by Marvel Comics. Adapted from the real-life bladesmith, he debuted in Wolverine Vol. 2 #1 (July 1988) and was created by Chris Claremont and John Buscema.

Muramasa's history is the same in Marvel Comics, but can put a portion of his soul into the swords he forges like the Muramasa Blade. Muramasa possesses a form of immortality and has encountered Wolverine many times over the years.

During the "X of Swords" storyline, the history of Wolverine receiving the Muramasa Blade from Muramasa was revisited. When going after the Muramasa Blade for the tournament, he follows a lead from Silver Samurai. A flashback detailing Wolverine's mobile adamantium skeleton in Hell encountering Muramasa's soul fragment while Muramasa's body was in a Hell circle near the portal to Hell. As Wolverine fights the Hand ninjas, Muramasa's voice stated that he used the same metal to make the Hand's arsenal after they threatened his home. This was also done for the same reason that he will fight for Krakoa as they are both trying to protect the home that they love. Within Hell, Muramasa is forging a sword using the fires of Hell. Finishing the sword, Muramasa notes that its almost time for the ceremony. As Wolverine regenerates in a cage, he meets Solem who also sought out Muramasa and took the Oracle of Arakko's advice, using his Hellblade to open a portal to Hell. Because he used Wolverine as a "guide", Solem wants Wolverine to take him to the Muramasa Blade. Both of them later see Muramasa give his swords to Krahllak's forces.

== Murmur ==
Murmur is the name of two characters appearing in American comic books published by Marvel Comics. The first incarnation of Murmur, Allan Rennie, first appeared in Generation X #12 (1996). The second incarnation, Arlette Truffaut, debuted in Alpha Flight vol. 2 #1 (1997).

=== Allan Rennie ===
Murmur

Publication information
- Publisher: Marvel Comics
- First appearance: Generation X #12 (February 1996)
- Created by: Scott Lobdell; Todd Dezago; Tom Grummett

In-story information
- Alter ego: Allan Rennie
- Species: Human mutant (de-powered)
- Team affiliations: Emplate's Hellions
- Abilities: Superhuman strength and durability; Teleportation

Murmur (Allan Rennie) appeared in Generation X #12-14 (February 1996), and was created by Scott Lobdell, Todd Dezago, and Tom Grummett. Murmur is a mutant with superhuman strength, durability, and the ability to generate portals in his line of sight.

Murmur was mutated into a pseudo-vampire form by Emplate. He joined a team that Emplate gathered to torment Generation X, including Bulwark, Vincente, DOA, and Chamber's former girlfriend Gayle Edgerton. Emplate's team are successful in capturing Generation X. When Murmur realizes he would soon be defeated, he flees along with Bulwark. Murmur was among the many mutants depowered by the Scarlet Witch during M-Day.

=== Arlette Truffaut ===
Murmur

Publication information
- Publisher: Marvel Comics
- First appearance: Alpha Flight vol. 2 #1 (July 1997)
- Created by: Steven T. Seagle; Scott Clark

In-story information
- Alter ego: Arlette Truffaut
- Species: Human mutant (de-powered)
- Team affiliations: Department H Beta Flight; Alpha Flight
- Abilities: Mind control

Murmur (Arlette Truffaut) is a former member of the superhero team's Alpha Flight and Beta Flight. She was a mutant with the ability to possess others with a touch.

Murmur joins Alpha Flight while the team is being heavily influenced by the Canadian government. One of her main duties is to mentally control Sasquatch. During one of her first missions, against the criminal organization Zodiac, she lost control of Sasquatch. Murmur and some of her teammates are briefly mind controlled by Mesmero. Though she breaks free, she cannot take control of Sasquatch in time and he injures her.

Jeremey Clarke, the leader of Alpha Flight, is killed in a battle with Zodiac. Murmur is shot in the leg by Zodiac members and sidelined from action for some time. Murmur was de-powered during M-Day.

== Mutant Master ==
Mutant Master is a character appearing in Marvel Comics. The Mutant Master was created by Roy Thomas and Ross Andru. The character was first mentioned in X-Men #26 (November 1966).

Mutant Master was a member of the supervillain Factor Three team. He was also a member of the Siris race and once on Earth he posed as mutant human. He secretly sought to trigger a war between the US and the USSR to wipe out the human race. However, his followers turned against him when he was exposed as being an alien, and to avoid capture he committed suicide.
