= Reaper (Louis Dawson) =

Reaper is a fictional character appearing in American comic books published by Marvel Comics. The character first appeared in Power Man and Iron Fist #109 (September 1984).

== Fictional character biography ==
Louis Dawson was a SWAT team member who became the masked Reaper after a family tragedy, and was defeated by Iron Fist and Power Man.
