= High Priest of Zor =

High Priest of Zor is a fictional character appearing in American comic books published by Marvel Comics. The character first appeared in Power Man and Iron Fist #102 (February 1984).

== Fictional character biography ==
High Priest of Zor captured the Scarlet Witch in service of his demonic master, but was defeated by Power Man and Iron Fist.
