= Master Khan =

Publication information
- Publisher: Marvel Comics
- First appearance: Strange Tales #77 (Oct. 1960)
- Created by: Stan Lee; Steve Ditko

In-story information
- Alter ego: Khan
- Species: Human magic user
- Team affiliations: The House of Thysslia
- Abilities: Magical powers, levitate and shrink objects and beings

Master Khan is a supervillain appearing in American comic books published by Marvel Comics, a recurring foe of Iron Fist and Luke Cage. He first appeared in Strange Tales #77 (October 1960), and was created by Stan Lee and Steve Ditko.

Within the shared universe of that company's publications, Master Khan is a sinister sorcerer "god" of K'un-L'un who demands human blood sacrifices from his worshippers.

== Publication history ==
Master Khan first appeared in Strange Tales #77 (October 1960), and was created by Stan Lee and Steve Ditko.

Namor, the Sub-Mariner writer/artist John Byrne credits Roger Stern with coming up with the idea that the mysterious Tyrone King was really Master Khan.

== Fictional character biography ==
Khan was a notable adversary early in Iron Fist's career, fighting Iron Fist, Luke Cage, Colleen Wing, and Misty Knight on numerous occasions as well as sending his agent Scimitar against them.

When Iron Fist contracts radiation poisoning, Luke Cage takes him to K'un-L'un for treatment. While there, Iron Fist is secretly impersonated by a H'ylthri, a plant-like alien whose species are ancient enemies of K'un-L'un. Soon after their return to the outside world, the doppelgänger is destroyed as a result of a scheme engineered by Master Khan.

Namor travels to K'un-L'un, where he finds Iron Fist alive. While in stasis with the H'ylthri, Iron Fist had focused his chi to cure his radiation poisoning. After returning to Earth and investigating the apparent invasion of Earth by the H'ylthri, Namor is forced to fight their captive, Wolverine. The battle is interrupted by Master Khan, who wipes Namor's memory and dumps him in the American Midwest.

Namor is missing for almost a year until Namorita tracks him down using a psychic link to him she had recently discovered. Namor does not regain his memory until sometime afterward, when he is captured by Doctor Doom. Doom's ship is magically imprisoned in a bottle by Master Khan, who assumes Namor's form. Namor soon breaks the bottle and the spell, and kills Khan.

== Powers and abilities ==
Master Khan has access to magical powers which he can use to distort reality, levitate, as well as shrink objects and living beings. Khan is also able to change his appearance, create magical shields, and launch energy blasts. He calls upon the mystic principalities for more power, including Cyttorak, the Faltine, and Raggadorr.
