= Wakanda Forever =

Wakanda Forever may refer to:

- "Wakanda Forever", a catchphrase associated with the Marvel Comics country of Wakanda
- Black Panther: Wakanda Forever, an American film from 2022
