= Radiant Child =

Radiant Child may refer to

- Jean-Michel Basquiat: The Radiant Child, a 2010 documentary film
- Radiant Child: The Story of Young Artist Jean-Michel Basquiat, a 2016 biography
