= Wakanda =

Fictional country from Marvel Comics

- Marvel Comics location
- Flag of Wakanda
- First appearance: As the Kingdom of Wakanda: Fantastic Four #52 (July 1966); As the Intergalactic Empire of Wakanda: Marvel Legacy #1 (September 2017)
- Created by: Stan Lee; Jack Kirby

In-universe information
- Type: Country
- Ruled by: Black Panther
- Ethnic group: Wakandan
- Race: Human
- Location: East Africa (on Earth); Wakanda-Prime (in space)
- Locations: Birnin Zana (Golden City); The Vibranium Mound; Jabari village
- Characters: T'Challa; Shuri; T'Chaka; T'Channa; Ramonda; M'Baku; Erik Killmonger; Storm; Gentle; Vibraxas
- Population: 6,000,000 (on Earth); 9,000,000,000 (on Wakanda-Prime)
- Publisher: Marvel Comics
- Demonym: Wakandan
- Government: Constitutional monarchy (on Earth); Galactic empire (on Wakanda-Prime)
- Currency: Wakandan Dollar
- Language(s): Wakandan; Yoruba; Hausa; Xhosa; English

Wakanda (/wəˈkɑːndə, -ˈkæn-/), officially the Kingdom of Wakanda, and later the Intergalactic Empire of Wakanda, is a fictional country appearing in American comic books published by Marvel Comics, particularly those featuring Black Panther. Created by Stan Lee and Jack Kirby, the country first appeared in Fantastic Four #52 (July 1966). Wakanda is located both in East Africa on Earth, and on Wakanda-Prime in outer space. T'Challa, the Black Panther, is usually portrayed as the monarch of the nation.

Wakanda has appeared in comics and various media adaptations, such as in the Marvel Cinematic Universe, where it is depicted as the most technologically advanced nation on Earth. The country first appears in film in Captain America: Civil War (2016).

== Location ==
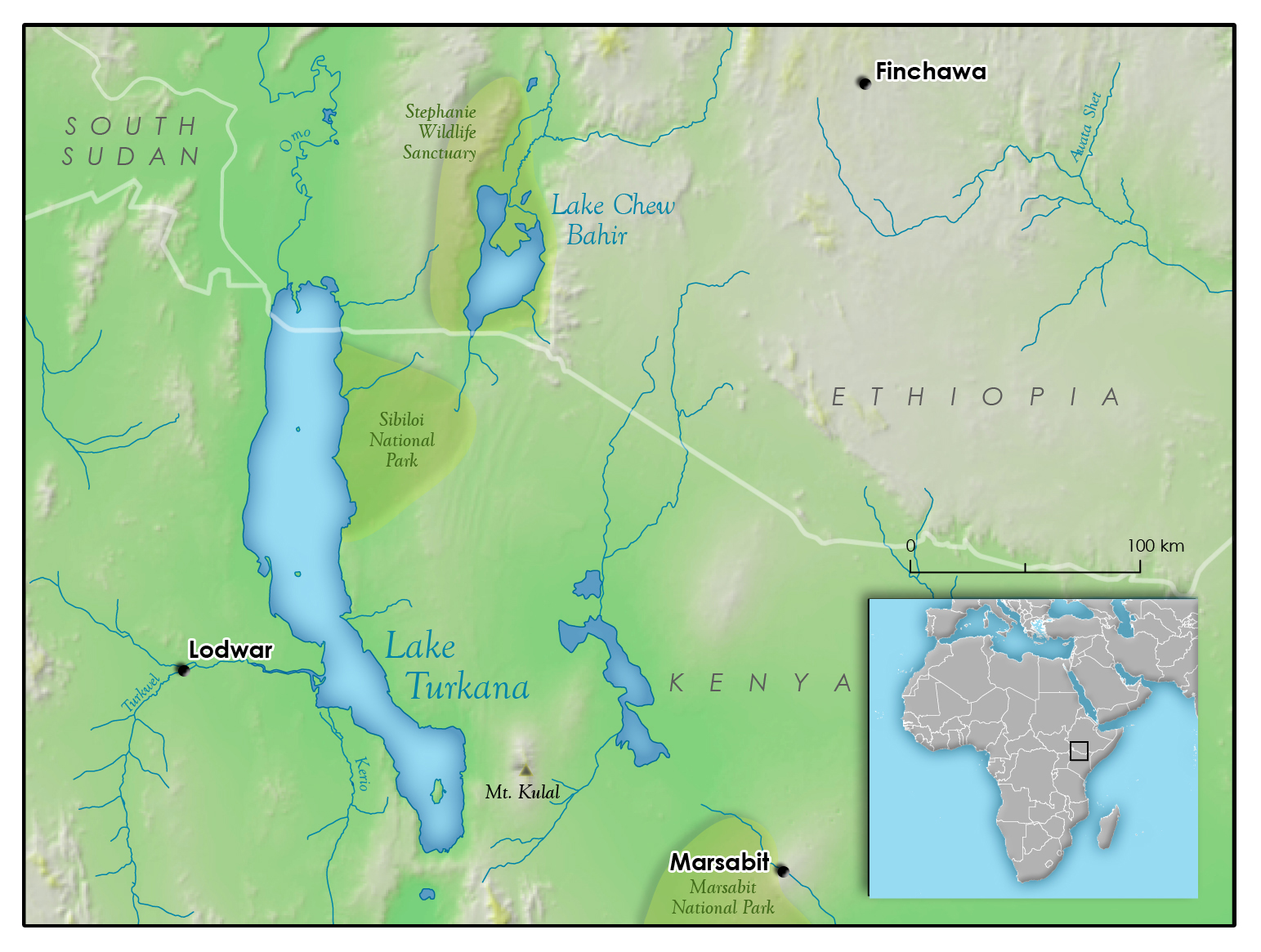
In the MCU, Wakanda is located just north of Lake Turkana, at a point bordering Kenya, Ethiopia, Uganda and South Sudan.

Some sources place Wakanda just north of Tanzania and exactly at Rwanda, while others — such as Marvel Atlas #2 — show it at the north end of Lake Turkana, in between South Sudan, Uganda, Kenya, and Ethiopia (and surrounded by fictional countries like Azania, Canaan, and Narobia).

Director Ryan Coogler stated that his depiction of Wakanda in the 2018 film Black Panther was inspired by the southern African Kingdom of Lesotho.

In Ta-Nehisi Coates's Black Panther series, Wakanda is located on Lake Victoria, near fellow fictional nations Mohannda, Canaan, Azania, and Niganda. This places these nations in the eastern half of the Democratic Republic of the Congo.

Birnin Zana is located within Wakanda. It is considered by some to be a smart city. In Birnin Zana, pedestrians walk along commerce-filled streets that are car-free except for the occasional appearance of bus-like shuttles. The whole is quite similar to the woonerf concept, an approach to public space design which started in the Netherlands in the 1970s. Maglev trains are seen zipping above and around the city. Wakandan buildings incorporate some traditional African elements, such as thatched roofs and hanging gardens, on some of the tallest structures.

== History ==
The Egyptian goddess Bast selected the region that would one day become the nation of Wakanda as her patron land.

Eons ago, during the First Blasphemy, Khonshu sought to avenge a prisoner killed by Varnae, but Bast warned him to stay his hand. Varnae had stolen Vibranium from the Fires of Ptah and planned to ascend to godhood, an act that drew Khonshu's attention. During Ra's slumber, Khonshu met with Bast, Eshu, Gherke, and Ptah, insisting that the gods of the surrounding realms be made aware before he retaliated. He secured their support, as well as the support of Kokou the Ever-Burning. Gherke was a deity venerated by the White Gorilla Cult of Jabari, whose followers had long stood opposed to the Panther Cult, and his presence at this council underscored the unprecedented gravity of the threat. It was then that the mortal leader Nyami summoned the deities and made a solemn pact with them: the Ennead and the Orishas would protect those who tilled that land, ensuring they would never wear chains again. This pact marked the first formal alliance between the Egyptian and West African pantheons. In the distant past, Bast and Gherke led the Enneads and the Orishas against Varnae's forces, while Kokou confronted the vampire god in his temple. The prisoners were evacuated as Bast instructed the black panthers to take the prisoners west and wait for the news of victory.

Before the emergence of the Wakandan nation, mystic beings known as Originators lived in the region. The Originators were diverse races: Anansi (spider-like), Vanyan (ape-like), Creeping Doom (insectoid), (Note: Ibeji is a twin orisha) Ibeji (two-headed humanoids), and Children of Olokun (sea-creatures).

Later, with the pact already established, the Originators were expelled from the region by the humans and the Orisha, the now-united pantheon of Wakanda consisting of Thoth, Ptah, Mujaji, Kokou, and Bast.

In the distant past, a massive meteorite made up of the element vibranium crashed in Wakanda. The meteorite was named Mena Ngai. It was unearthed a generation before the events of the present day. T'Challa, the previous Black Panther and brother to the current Black Panther, Shuri, is the son of T'Chaka, the Black Panther before him and a descendant of Olumo Bashenga. Knowing that others would attempt to manipulate and dominate Wakanda for this rare and valuable resource, T'Chaka conceals his country from the outside world. He sells off minute amounts of the valuable vibranium while surreptitiously sending the country's best scholars to study abroad, consequently turning Wakanda into one of the world's most technologically advanced nations. Eventually, however, the explorer Ulysses Klaue finds his way to Wakanda and covers up his work on a vibranium-powered, sound-based weapon. When exposed, Klaue kills T'Chaka, only to see his "sound blaster" turned on him by a grieving teenaged T'Challa. Klaue's right hand is destroyed, and he and his men flee.

Wakanda has an unusually high rate of mutation due to the dangerously mutagenic properties of the Vibranium mound. A large number of these Wakandan mutates are working for Erik Killmonger.

Vibranium radiation has permeated much of Wakanda's flora and fauna, including the Heart-Shaped Herb eaten by members of the Black Panther Tribe (although T'Challa once allowed a dying Spider-Man to eat it in the hope that it would help him deal with a mysterious illness) and the flesh of the White Gorilla eaten by the members of the White Gorilla Tribe.

In the 2008 "Secret Invasion" storyline, Skrull forces led by Commander K'vvvr invade Wakanda and engage Black Panther and his forces. Due to heavy resistance to the deployment of technological developments, both sides are forced to fight with swords and spears. The Wakandan forces voluntarily wear panther masks; this prevents the Skrulls from focusing attacks on their leader. Despite losses, the Wakandans defeat the Skrulls. They kill every single one, including K'vvvr, and send their ship back, packed with the bodies. A warning against invading Wakanda is left written on the wall of the ship's control center.

While under the cosmic power of the Phoenix Force, Namor attacks Wakanda for hiding the Avengers and destroys much of the country with a tidal wave. After the attack, all mutants (particularly those who were siding with Phoenix controlled mutants) are banned from entering Wakanda as stated by Black Panther. Some students from the Jean Grey school are attacked by the Wakandan people; the students barely flee with the help of Storm.

When Hydra manipulates a sentient cosmic cube named Kobik into unknowingly replacing the real Captain America's Steve Rogers with his Hydra counterpart, then enact their Secret Empire, Wakanda is under a threat to be taken over by the rise of terrorist group across the universe, with its king T'Challa getting captured and forced to surrender, until all heroes and some villains who rebel against Hydra finally find a way to get both Kobik and the real Steve Rogers back, while rescuing both T'Challa and the rest of both captured and manipulated heroes. Once Hydra's empire has been undone, Wakanda expanded its legacy to form an intergalactic empire on Planet Bast, while also revoking the mutant ban in their country, such as allowing Storm to visit and help anytime. The empire, now encompassing five galaxies, arises after a mission that sought the origin of Mena Ngai, the meteorite that brought the vibranium to Wakanda.

2000 years in the distant past, a man named after Killmonger's real name, N'Jadaka, became a hero of the empire after retrieving the Shard of M'Kraan during the war against the Shi'ar Empire. However, the current ruler of Wakanda feared that N'Jadaka would overthrow him, so he sent N'Jadaka along with his squad on a secret suicide mission to take the Matrix of the Mamadou galaxy, which was inhabited by the Kronans, Shadow People, and the Klyntar. Upon arriving on a planet in the galaxy, they were quickly attacked by a race known as the Between. Trying to survive, he came across a member of the Klyntar race and bonded with it, since they had a mutual hatred against the current emperor, who made the Klyntar an endangered species. Upon defeating the Between, N'Jadaka and the symbiote killed the emperor and took the throne as the new emperor of the Intergalactic Empire of Wakanda, naming their new homeworld Wakanda-Prime. During this time, he got married and conceived a daughter. Upon finding out that T'Challa from the future had arrived in his present, he feared that T'Challa would join the Maroon rebels, so he had him become a member of the Nameless, slaves who had their memories wiped and were forced to mine for Vibranium on asteroids. However, T'Challa retained his memories of Storm and managed to escape to join the Maroons regardless. After that, N'Jadaka approached Bast and after recounting his origin, battled Bast's avatar. He was successful in killing it and making his daughter the new Avatar of Bast. After the Maroons got ahold of N'Jadaka's daughter and T'Challa had visited the planet of the Between, N'Jadaka with his army went after the rebels in order to get his daughter back. However, Bast betrayed him and made his Empire fighters crash into the mothership while a rebel commander set the planet holding the rebel base's core to explode as a last ditch attempt to stop him; resulting in the sacrifice of thousands of lives and the apparent death of N'Jadaka.

After N'Jadaka invades Earth, Queen Ramonda forms an alliance with the Originators to prevent total destruction. T'Challa ultimately becomes the ruler of the modern-day version of the Intergalactic Empire of Wakanda, taking control of it from B'Wete and his Ebony Guard, merging its rule with that of the Kingdom of Wakanda.

== Characterization ==
=== Name ===
There are several theories about the etymology of Wakanda. The name may be inspired by a Siouan god called Wakan Tanka, Wakanda, Wakonda, or Waconda; or Wakandas. Or it may draw from a fictional African tribe from Edgar Rice Burroughs' novel The Man-Eater, written in 1915 but published posthumously in 1957; or otherwise from any of several terms derived from the Proto-Bantu "-ganda", such as the Kenyan Kamba ethnic group, also called Akamba or Wakamba; or the word kanda, which means "family" in Kikongo.

=== Language ===
Wakanda has three official languages: Wakandan, Yoruba, and Hausa. In the Marvel Cinematic Universe, characters from Wakanda are portrayed speaking the South African Xhosa language. The Jabari Tribe are portrayed speaking a dialect similar to Igbo from Nigeria.

In the 2018 film Black Panther and its 2022 sequel Black Panther: Wakanda Forever, the Wakandan language is depicted as being written in a Wakandan writing system based on the Nsibidi writing system; the Wakandan writing system was created for the film by production designer Hannah Beachler. According to designer Zach Fannin, it was also inspired by Tifinagh, Ancient South Arabian and Bamum script.

=== Defenses ===
The Wakandan Army is Wakanda's main ground forces, while the Wakandan Navy oversees naval operations. The Wakandan Air Guard is the nation's air force, which includes pilots wearing powerful suits of combat armor. In order to ensure peace and stability in Wakanda, the Black Panther picked Dora Milaje ("adored ones") from rival tribes to serve as his personal guard and ceremonial wives-in-training. The Dora Milaje are trained in various African martial arts such as n'golo (Angolan), laamb (Senegalese wrestling) and Nguni stick-fighting, as well as other forms of combat from other continents such as krav maga and muay thai.

The N'Charu Silema is a spy network that worked across the globe to maintain the nation's secrecy. It was considered as good as the Mossad and certainly better than the CIA and MI6. Later, P.R.I.D.E. (Princess Regent Intelligence Division Executives) was developed as the nation's protection agency. The nation has a secret police called Hatut Zeraze (War Dogs in the Wakandan language). Wakanda is one of the few Earth-616 civilizations who have contingency plans for dealing with Galactus, "The Devourer of Worlds".

== Wakandan religion ==
Wakanda is polytheistic, possessing a diverse pantheon of deities that reflect deeply syncretic origins. Wakanda contains a number of religious sects originating from various places in Africa. The pantheon of Wakanda is known as The Orisha, a Yoruba word meaning "spirit" or "deity". and the use of the term reflects the fact that Yoruba is one of Wakanda's official languages. The majority of the pantheon derives from Heliopolitan (ancient Egyptian) tradition, Bast the Panther Goddess, Thoth, god of the moon and wisdom, and Ptah, the Shaper, are Heliopolitan deities, who left ancient Egypt at the time of the pharaohs. Kokou is a warrior god from Benin, and the only deity in the Wakandan pantheon known as an orisha in its place of origin. Mujaji is a rain goddess of the Lobedu people of South Africa. Other deities are worshiped in Wakanda, such as Sekhmet and Sobek, other Helipolitan deities, and the gorilla gods Ghekre and Ngi, worshiped by the Jabari tribe. The mutant Ororo Munroe (aka Storm), ex-wife of T'Challa and former queen of Wakanda, is called Hadari-Yao ("Walker of Clouds" in ancient Alkamite), a goddess who preserves the balance of natural things. Other little-known gods of Wakanda are Anansi and enemies of Bast: K'Liluna, Bast's sister, considered a betrayer, and Magba.

In Wakandan cosmology, the spiritual geography is marked by two distinct yet complementary planes. Djalia is the mystical plane that serves as Wakanda's collective memory and ancestral realm, where former kings and rulers reside, offering guidance and counsel to the living and establishing a direct bridge between the nation's past and present. The Panther Pavilion, in turn, is the sacred temple of the goddess Bast, situated in a border region between Celestial Heliopolis, the realm of the Egyptian gods and Ala (or Orun), the home of the Orishas.

=== Panther cult ===
Bast the Panther Goddess, based on Bast the ancient Egyptian deity, is the primary deity of Wakanda. After the vibranium meteor fell, a number of Wakandans were painfully mutated into "demon spirits" and began attacking their fellow Wakandans.

T'Challa's ancestor Olumo Bashenga began to close the vibranium mound to outsiders. He formed a religious order that guarded the mound and fought to keep the "demon spirits" from spreading across the kingdom. As the ceremonial and religious role, he took the title of Black Panther as chief of the Panther Tribe. As part of the cult's ceremonies, a Black Panther is entitled to the use of a heart-shaped herb. The herb enhances the physical attributes of the person who consumes it to near-superhuman levels, in a similar manner to the super-soldier serum.

=== White Gorilla cult ===
The tribe that would become the Jabari worshiped Ngi, who was responsible for creating Gorilla-Man. Ngi was based on the Yaounde deity of the same name. Currently, the Jabari tribe worship the gorilla god Ghekre, based on the Baoulé deity of the same name. Wakanda evolved from a hunter-warrior society, and was traditionally ruled by its greatest warrior. The dominant Black Panther Cult outlawed the rival White Gorilla Cult's worship in Wakanda. M'Baku (Man-Ape) of the Jabari tribe is one of Wakanda's greatest warriors, second only to T'Challa, the Black Panther himself. While T'Challa, king of Wakanda, is on a several-month leave of absence from Wakanda, the ambitious M'Baku plots to usurp the throne. M'Baku flouts T'Challa's edicts and revives the White Gorilla Cult, killing one of the rare white gorillas living in the jungles near Wakanda. M'Baku bathes in the gorilla's blood and eats its flesh which "mystically" confers the gorilla's great strength upon M'Baku. He tries to defeat T'Challa in combat, hoping to take over the country, but is beaten and banished from Wakanda. According to the 2018 film, the White Gorilla cult, known in the film as the Jabari (or the Mountain Tribe), revere the (Hindu) monkey god, Hanuman.

=== Lion cult ===
Sekhmet the Lion Goddess, based on the deity of the same name, could possess the form of any human worshipers or the bodies of those sanctified and sacrificed by her worshipers; she transformed these subjects into human avatars of herself. She has a number of other powers, some of which she has demonstrated. Sekhmet could grow in size, move at rapid speeds, teleport herself and others, and alter her specific density. The Lion goddess possessed superhuman strength and durability, and she was immortal. She can manipulate the minds of the weak-willed.

Little is known of the history of the Lion Goddess. She had apparently lost many worshipers over the years to the Cult of the Panther God, despite the fact that Sekhmet physically manifested before its followers, and the Panther God only appears to its priests.

=== Crocodile cult ===
Sobek the Crocodile God, based on the deity of the same name, appears to be an ancient and somewhat neglected Wakandan deity.

== Cultural impact and legacy ==
A 2023 presentation by Gene Kannenberg, Jr at Northwestern University considering Wakanda as a fictional lens to view Africa and the African diaspora from an academic perspective

=== Accolades ===
- In 2019, CBR.com ranked Wakanda 5th in their "10 Most Iconic Superhero Hideouts In Marvel Comics" list.
- In 2020, CBR.com ranked Wakanda 1st in their "10 Most Powerful Fictional Nations In the Marvel Universe" list.
- In 2021, Screen Rant included Wakanda in their "10 Most Important Fictional Marvel Comics Countries" list.
- In 2022, CBR.com ranked Wakanda 5th in their "The Avengers' 10 Best Allies In Marvel Comics" list.

=== Cultural impact ===
- Russell Okung, an offensive tackle for the Los Angeles Chargers, introduced himself as an alumnus of "Wakanda Tech" during the starting lineups of Sunday Night Football in 2018. Okung actually attended Oklahoma State University; after the game, he tweeted that his fictional alma mater was "coming for" Alabama.
- In December 2019, it was discovered that the US Department of Agriculture's website listed Wakanda as a free-trade partner, with a list of traded goods which included ducks, donkeys, and dairy cows. The USDA claimed the fictional country had been added to the list "by accident during a staff test" and removed it soon after the public became aware of it.
- The Wakandan capital city, Birnin Zana, could offer an alternative for what future cities could be like in Africa. There are already many smart city initiatives being worked out in Africa, with many ecocities emerging across the continent.
- Senegalese-American singer Akon announced plans to build "Akon City", a solar-powered "real-life" Wakanda on 2,000 acres of coastal land in Senegal inspired by Birnin Zana. He first shared his concept for a futuristic, technologically advanced city in 2018 and said it would welcome members of the African diaspora. The Washington Post reported that the project had secured $4 billion of the $6 billion investment necessary to build Akon City. In 2025, the project was ultimately abandoned.
- Technology writers have also compared Wakandan principles to those expressed in African technology research. Anti-colonial AI, for example, has been described as "in keeping with Wakandan principles" by developing technology for benevolent purposes. It also seeks "to avoid algorithmic exploitation and algorithmic oppression" in artificial intelligence.
- The Wakanda name has also been adopted in small businesses. One example is Wakanda Place, an African and multicultural bar in Adelaide, South Australia. Entertainment at the bar includes DJs who play music from Africa and the African diaspora.
- Social media users in Indonesia often use "Wakanda" as a pejorative name for the country, initially used to criticise the government or law enforcement authorities. For instance, a tweet criticising the Indonesian police may read, "Only in the country of Wakanda, law enforcers only act after it goes viral", instead of mentioning Indonesia directly. The use of such a disguise is intended to avoid problems with legal authorities amidst declining freedom of expression in Indonesia. A presidential candidate for the 2024 Indonesian presidential election, Anies Baswedan, promised to guarantee freedom of expression in Indonesia and once tweeted, "Wakanda no more, Indonesia forever."

== In other media ==
=== Television ===
- Wakanda appears in the 1996 Fantastic Four episode "Prey of the Black Panther". This version follows the country's portrayal in the original Lee and Kirby run, depicted as a tribal African nation. While vibranium is still native to their lands, Wakanda does not garner advanced technology until T'Challa comes back from studying abroad.
- Wakanda appears in the Black Panther TV series.
- Wakanda appears in The Avengers: Earth's Mightiest Heroes.
- Wakanda appears in the Marvel Disk Wars: The Avengers episode "His Majesty, Black Panther!".
- Wakanda appears in Avengers Assemble.
- Wakanda appears in the X-Men '97 episode "Tolerance is Extinction - Part 3".

=== Film ===
- Wakanda appears in the straight-to-DVD animated feature Ultimate Avengers 2. This version is an extreme isolationist nation that views all outsiders as enemies.
- Wakanda appears in Lego Marvel Super Heroes – Black Panther: Trouble in Wakanda.
- Wakanda appears in the Disney XD short film Black Panther in … The Visitor.

=== Marvel Cinematic Universe ===
Wakanda appears in the Marvel Cinematic Universe films Avengers: Age of Ultron, Captain America: Civil War, Black Panther, Avengers: Infinity War, Avengers: Endgame, Black Panther: Wakanda Forever, and in the Disney+ TV series What If...? and Eyes of Wakanda.

=== Video games ===
- Wakanda appears as a stage in Marvel: Ultimate Alliance 2.
- Wakanda makes a cameo in Storm's ending in Marvel vs. Capcom 3: Fate of Two Worlds.
- Wakanda's Vibranium mines appear as a level stage in Marvel Heroes.
- Wakanda appears as a stage in Disney Infinity 3.0.
- Wakanda, merged with Monster Hunter 4's Val Habar to become Valkanda, appears as a stage in Marvel vs. Capcom: Infinite.
- Wakanda appears in Lego Marvel Super Heroes 2. Kang the Conqueror steals it, among other locations to create Chronopolis.
- A Wakandan embassy appears in Marvel's Spider-Man (2018). A Wakandan flag appears as a collectible Time Capsule item in the game's followup, Marvel's Spider-Man: Miles Morales.
- Wakanda appears in Marvel Ultimate Alliance 3: The Black Order.
- Wakanda appears in Marvel Snap.
- Wakanda appears in the "Black Panther: War for Wakanda" DLC for Marvel's Avengers. Five years prior, T'Challa was going to align Wakanda with the Avengers. However, following Captain America's assumed death and the Avengers' disbandment, he closed Wakanda's borders. In the present, after Captain America was found alive and Avengers is reassembled, A.I.M. hires Klaw to assist in their efforts to steal Vibranium and scientists from Wakanda, but T'Challa and Wakanda's forces work with the Avengers to repel the villains. After Klaw's demise, T'Challa relieves from his duty as a king and appointed his sister, Shuri as the country's new queen.

=== Books ===
==== Novels ====
- J. Holland, Jesse (2017). Black Panther: Who is the Black Panther?. ISBN 978-1302902674.
- McCann, Jim (2018). Black Panther – The Junior Novel (novelization of the movie Black Panther). ISBN 9780316413206.
- Smith, Ronald L. (2018). Black Panther: The Young Prince. ISBN 9781484787649.
- Stone, Nic (2020). Shuri: A Black Panther Novel. ISBN 9781338585476.
- Stone, Nic (2021). Shuri: The Vanished. ISBN 9780702302831.
- Smith, Ronald L. (2021). Black Panther: Spellbound. ISBN 9781368071246.
- Stone, Nic (2022). Shuri: Symbiosis. ISBN 9781338766554.
- Smith, Ronald L. (2022). Black Panther: Uprising. ISBN 9781368073004.

==== Anthology ====
- J. Holland, Jesse (2021). Black Panther: Tales of Wakanda. ISBN 9781789095678.

==== Little Golden Books ====
Two Little Golden Books were published.

- Berrios, Frank (2018). Black Panther. ISBN 9781524763886.
- Berrios, Frank (2018). Warriors of Wakanda. ISBN 9781984831729.

==== Mighty Marvel Chapter Books ====
- Snider, Brandon T. (2018). Black Panther: Battle for Wakanda. ISBN 9781368020145.

==== Miscellaneous ====
- Wiacek, Stephen. (2018). Marvel Black Panther: The Ultimate Guide. ISBN 9781465466266
- Horne, Karama. (2022); Black Panther: Protectors of Wakanda: A History and Training Manual of the Dora Milaje from the Marvel Universe. ISBN 9780760375808
- Narcisse, Evan. (2022). Wakanda Atlas. ISBN 9780744050301
- Womack, Ytasha. (2023). Black Panther: A Cultural Exploration. ISBN 9780760375617

== See also ==
- List of fictional African countries
- Wakamba, a Bantu ethnic group in Kenya.
- Solarpunk
- Wauconda, places in the United States with a similar sounding name
