= Bast (Marvel Comics) =

Publication information
- Publisher: Marvel Comics
- First appearance: As idol: Fantastic Four #52 (July 1966); As Sacred Black Panther: Fantastic Four #53 (August 1966); As Panther-God: Avengers Vol. 1 #87 (April 1971); As Panther Spirit: Black Panther Vol. 1 #9 (May 1978); As Bast: Black Panther Vol. 3 #21 (August 2000)
- Created by: Stan Lee and Jack Kirby

In-story information
- Team affiliations: Heliopolitan Gods; The Orisha
- Notable aliases: Bastet; Babastis; Cat God; Cat Goddess; Lady of the East; Panther Goddess; Baast-Hathor; Panther spirit Sacred Black Panther
- Abilities: Ennead physiology

Bast is a fictional character appearing in American comic books published by Marvel Comics. The character first appeared as an idol in Fantastic Four #52 (cover-dated July 1966), created by Stan Lee and Jack Kirby, and is based on the Egyptian cat goddess Bastet. Bast is a member of the Heliopolitan and Wakandan pantheons. and the patron of the superhero Black Panther.

Bast appears in the live-action Marvel Cinematic Universe (MCU) film Black Panther (2018) and was played by Akosia Sabet in Thor: Love and Thunder (2022).

== Publication history ==
Bast or Bastet is an ancient Egyptian goddess represented as a black cat. Bast first appeared in Marvel comics alongside Black Panther in Fantastic Four #52 as an idol, referred to as a male deity, the Sacred Black Panther.

In Avengers #87 (April 1971), written by Roy Thomas and illustrated by Sal Buscema, he is referred to as Panther-God. In Black Panther vol. 1 #7 (cover-dated January 1978), written and illustrated by Jack Kirby, the first Black Panther, Olumo Bashenga, is said to have instituted the Panther cult. In Black Panther vol. 1 #9 (cover-dated May 1978), written and illustrated by Jack Kirby and the four issue Black Panther miniseries (1988), written by Peter B. Gillis and illustrated by Denys Cowan, is referred to as Panther spirit. In Black Panther vol. 3 #21 (cover-dated August 2000) written by Christopher Priest and illustrated by Sal Velutto the Panther-God of Wakanda was retconned as Bast. In Black Panther vol. 6 #13 (cover-date June 2017) written by Ta-Nehisi Coates and illustrated by Wilfredo Torres it is revealed that Bast is part of the Wakandan pantheon, called the Orisha, alongside gods from throughout Africa: Thoth and Ptah (Egypt), Mujaji (South Africa), and Kokou (Benin). In later stories, Bast is depicted as female.

== Fictional character biography ==
Bast the Panther Goddess is one of the eldest of the Ennead and the primary deity of Wakanda. The daughter of the powerful Egyptian sun god Atum / Ra, Bast inherited her father's life-giving heat while her sister, the lion goddess Sekhmet, inherited his fiery, destructive fury. Bast was worshipped on Earth as early as 10,000 BC, granting power to her worshippers "the Children of Bast" and their descendants in the mountaintop city of Bastet, the High Kingdom.

After Egypt's mortal pharaohs rose to power, Bast began to obtain worshippers in the area that would one day become Wakanda as the "Panther God." Her sister Sekhmet arrived later and came to be worshipped in Wakanda as the "Lion God." As the pharaohs consolidated their rule over Egypt, many of the old gods withdrew to Celestial Heliopolis. Bast instead chose to adopt a realm bordering both Celestial Heliopolis and Ala (or Orun), the home of the Orishas, the African gods and established her temple there, within the Panther God Pavilion, serving as a bridge between the Egyptian and West African pantheons.

Eons before the founding of Wakanda, during the First Blasphemy, Varnae stole vibranium from the Fires of Ptah and planned to ascend to godhood. Khonshu sought to avenge a prisoner slain by Varnae, but Bast warned him not to act alone, lest it spark a war between the Enneads and the Orishas, the gods of West Africa. During Ra's slumber, Khonshu, Bast, Eshu, Ptah, and Gherke gathered beneath the cresting moon. Gherke was a deity venerated by the White Gorilla Cult of Jabari, whose followers had long stood opposed to the Panther Cult, and his presence at this council underscored the unprecedented gravity of the threat. It was then that the mortal leader Nyami summoned the deities and made a solemn pact with them: the Ennead and the Orishas would protect those who tilled that land, ensuring they would never wear chains again. This pact marked the first formal alliance between the Egyptian and West African pantheons. With the support of Kokou the Ever-Burning, Bast and Gherke, whose very presence symbolized the bridging of even the oldest rivalries, led the combined forces against Varnae's army, while Kokou confronted the vampire god directly within his temple.

Later, with the pact already established, mystic beings known as Originators were expelled from the region by the humans and the Orisha, the now-united pantheon of Wakanda, which included both Egyptian deities such as Thoth, Ptah, and Bast, alongside African gods like Mujaji, Kokou, and others. This divine coalition, however, was not without internal strife: Bast's other sister, K'Liluna, was deemed a traitor and banished from the pantheon. and Bast herself once clashed in battle with another god, Magba.

In the distant past, a massive meteorite made of vibranium crashed in Wakanda. After the vibranium meteor fell, a number of Wakandans were mutated into "demon spirits" and began attacking their fellow Wakandans. T'Challa's ancestor Bashenga gathered Wakanda's tribes under his guide, becoming the founder and first ruler of Wakanda. Bashenga also became the first Black Panther, gaining a spiritual connection with Bast.

== Powers and abilities ==
Bast's Ennead physiology gives her immortality, super-strength, power bestowal, shapeshifting, teleportation, and solar energy absorption.

== Other versions ==
=== Secret Wars (2016) ===
An alternate universe version of Bast appears in "Secret Wars" as the ruler of the Battleworld domain of Egyptia, alongside Khonshu.

=== Ultimate Universe ===
An alternate universe version of Bast appears in Ultimate Black Panther.

== In other media ==
- Bast is alluded to in the Marvel Cinematic Universe films Captain America: Civil War and Black Panther.
- Bast appears in Thor: Love and Thunder, portrayed by Akosia Sabet. This version is a member of the Council of Godheads.
- Bast appears in Magic: The Gathering's Marvel Super-Heroes set (2026).
