= Mufaro's Beautiful Daughters =

1987 picture book by John Steptoe

- Author: John Steptoe
- Illustrator: John Steptoe
- Genre: Picture Book, Folktale
- Publisher: Scholastic (1989)
- Publication date: 1987
- Publication place: United States
- Awards: Caldecott Honor Book

Mufaro's Beautiful Daughters is a children's picture book published in 1987 by John Steptoe. The book won many awards for Steptoe's illustrations, and went on to be adapted into many different children's literature curricula. In the late 1980s, Weston Woods made a version of the book, narrated by Terry Alexander.

== Summary ==
Mufaro is a villager who lives with his two daughters, Manyara and Nyasha. The two sisters are beautiful, but are opposites in many ways. Manyara is bad tempered and bullies her sister whenever their father's back is turned, while Nyasha is seen favorably by the villagers for her kindness. When they learn of the Great King's request for his citizens to send him any women they see as worthy of becoming his wife, their father chooses to send both of his daughters. Manyara goes first and along the way meets a hungry boy, but refuses to offer him any food. She also comes across an old woman offering advice on how to progress past a grove of laughing trees and a man with his head tucked under his arm, but does not listen to them and hurries to the royal city. Conversely, when Nyasha leaves on her trek, she chooses to feed the young boy a yam and listens to the old woman. When Nyasha and her father arrive in the city they are met by her frightened sister. Manyara begs them not to go into the king's chambers, as there is a giant monster (a snake with five heads) in there that recited her bad deeds and threatened to devour her. Manyara is frightened that it will harm her sister, but Nyasha enters the chambers. Upon her arrival, Nyasha is met by a harmless garden snake named Nyoka she had met while gardening earlier. He reveals himself as the king and states that he had shapeshifted during the journey in order to test the sisters' personalities and kindness. Nyoka chooses to marry Nyasha due to her kindness and beauty, making her the queen, while Manyara becomes one of Nyasha's servants.

== Inspiration ==
Steptoe derived his inspiration from the folktale, Kaffir Folk-lore, published by author G.M. Theal in 1895. Steptoe's illustrations reflect his time in studying an ancient city in Zimbabwe; the images of flowers and trees are exact replicas of the ones that lived during the reign of this unknown ancient city.

== Characters ==
- Mufaro (moo-FAR-oh): means “happy man” in Shona (native language of Steptoe); Manyara and Nyasha's father; has some power in the village, but its extent is unclear. He is a happy, good-natured man who loves his daughters.
- Nyasha (née-AH-sha): means “mercy” in Shona; one of Mufaro's daughters who becomes the queen at the end of the story. She is kind, caring, and compassionate to everyone.
- Manyara (mahn-YAR-ah): means “ashamed” in Shona; one of Mufaro's daughters who becomes one of Nyasha's servants at the end of the story. She is arrogant, selfish, and consistently cruel to her sister, animals, and the other villagers.
- Nyoka (née-YO-kah): means “snake” in Shona; the king, but we do not know until the end of the story; the king shape-shifted into a snake (hence the name) to spy on the village women to decide which one is suitable to become his wife.

== Awards ==
- The Caldecott Honor Book (1988): The Caldecott Medal is awarded annually to celebrate the achievement of picture book illustrations. Every year the Caldecott committee also cites other books as worthy of attention. These books are named Caldecott Honor Books and silver medals may be awarded to those books.
- Coretta Scott King Award for Illustrators (1988): The Coretta Scott King Award for Illustrators is awarded annually to one African American illustrator who demonstrates "appreciation of African American culture and universal human values".

== Reception ==
Mufaro's Beautiful Daughters was well received by critics, who celebrated it for having what they described as both positive messages and beautiful illustrations. It has been used in children's education in lesson plans about the need for generosity, black representation in children's books, and to serve as an example of descriptive people and settings. Additionally, it was used in a study of children's literacy. Lastly, due to its representation of minority culture and simple diction, it also is seen in many different curricula for teaching English as a second language.
