= Devourer (comics) =

Devourer is a fictional character appearing in American comic books published by Marvel Comics. The character first appeared in Marvel Two-in-One #23 (January 1977).

== Fictional character biography ==
Devourer is a large creature captured by the Heliopolitans, and fought Thor and the Thing.
