= Ronald L. Smith =

American author

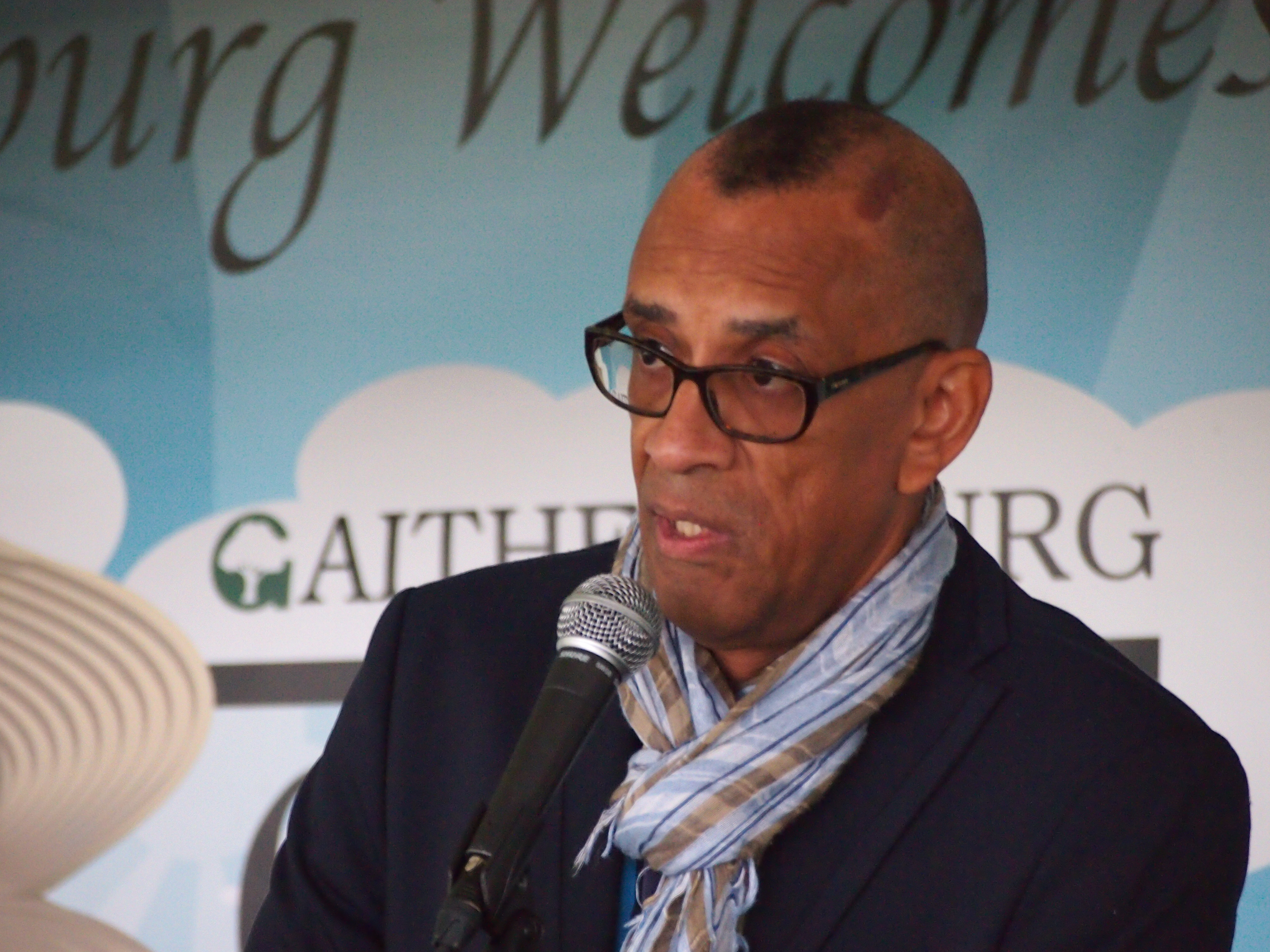
Ronald L. Smith at the Gaithersburg Book Festival 2016

Ronald L. Smith is a children's book author. He is the author of Hoodoo (2015), The Mesmerist (2017), Black Panther: The Young Prince (2018), The owls have come to take us away (2019), and Gloom Town (2020). For Hoodoo, Smith won the American Library Association's Coretta Scott King/John Steptoe Award for New Talent.

== Early life ==
Smith was born in Maine to a military family that moved frequently; he also lived in Japan, Alabama, Michigan, Washington, DC, South Carolina, and Delaware, among other places. His love of fantasy and science fiction novels began as a child, but he first worked as a writer in advertising before turning to writing children's fiction.

== Fiction career ==
Smith published his first book, Hoodoo, with Clarion Books in 2015. Set in the 1930s Alabama, Hoodoo earned Smith the American Library Association's Coretta Scott King/John Steptoe Award for New Talent.

Smith's second book, The Mesmerist (Clarion Books, 2017), is set in London at the turn of the century.

In January 2018, Smith published a children's novel for Marvel Comics featuring Marvel's superhero Black Panther. The book, Black Panther: The Young Prince, was released just prior to Marvel's Black Panther film. Reviewing the book in the Bulletin of the Center for Children's Literature, Kate Quealy-Gainer wrote, "Fans will notice allusions to T'Challa's future adventures as the ruling Black Panther, but even the comic-book averse will relate to T'Challa's negotiating of middle-school dynamics and may also appreciate his cleverness, as he faces down his enemies." The School Library Journal named the book to a list of eight fantasy "must-reads" featuring a black protagonist; their January 2018 review called it a "must-purchase for all collections."

== Personal life ==
Smith lives in Baltimore.
