= Javaka Steptoe =

American illustrator (born 1971)

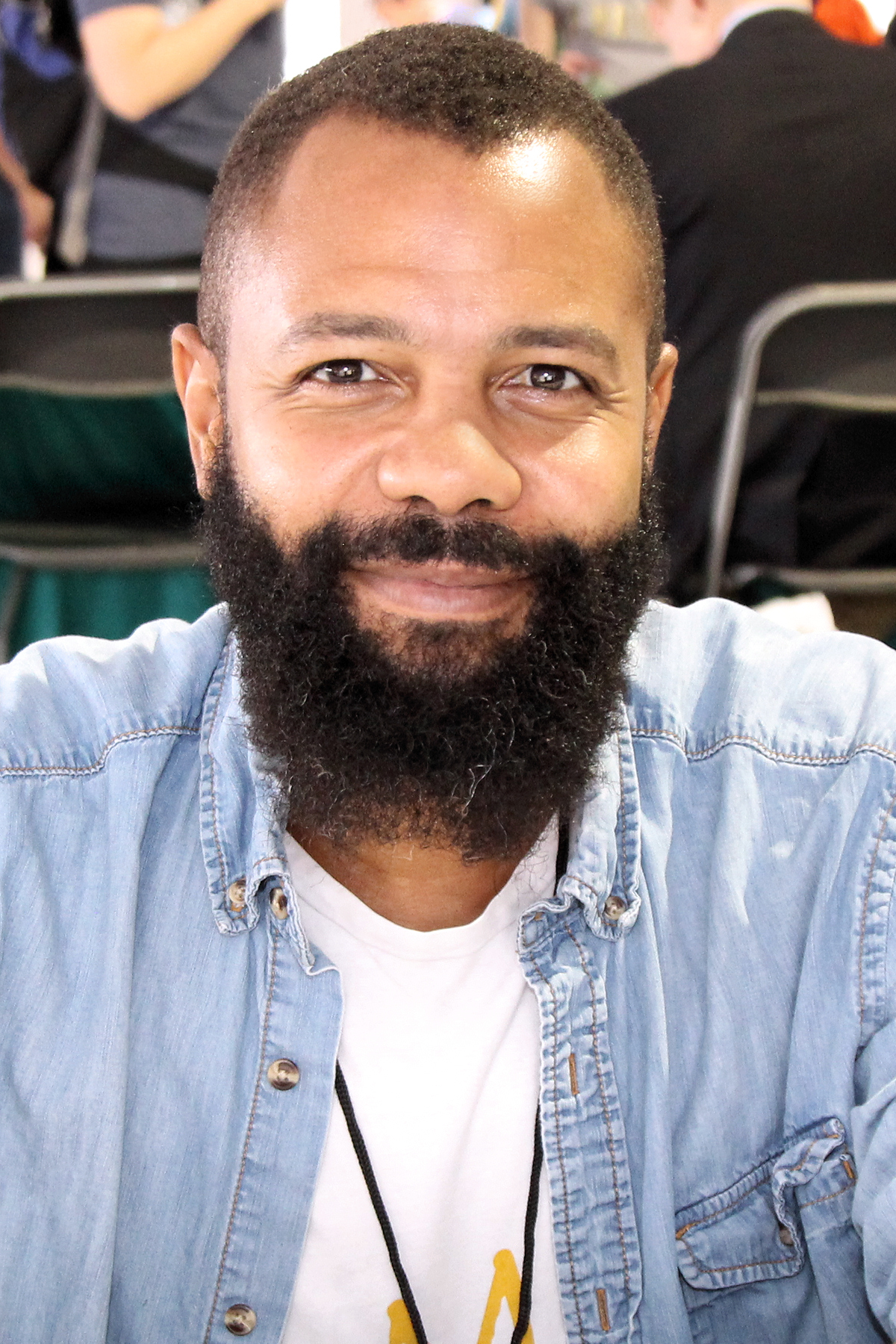
- Steptoe at the 2017 Texas Book Festival
- Born: 19 April 1971 (age 55)
- Parent: John Steptoe (father)
- Writing career
- Notable work: Radiant Child: The Story of Young Artist Jean-Michel Basquiat
- Notable awards: Caldecott Medal; Coretta Scott King Illustrator Award
- Website: javaka.com

Javaka Steptoe (born April 19, 1971) is an American author and illustrator. He won the 2017 Caldecott Medal as well as the Americas Award for Children's and Young Adult Literature, and the Coretta Scott King Book Award from the American Library Association for his picture book Radiant Child: The Story of Young Artist Jean-Michel Basquiat.

== Early life ==
Javaka Steptoe was born and raised in Brooklyn, New York. He is the son of John Steptoe, who twice won Caldecott Honors (for his book The Story of Jumping Mouse in 1985 and Mufaro’s Beautiful Daughters in 1988.) Growing up, Javaka Steptoe served as a model for his father's books. He then attended Cooper Union, earning a BFA.

== Career ==
Steptoe's Radiant Child: The Story of Young Artist Jean-Michel Basquiat was initially inspired by an exhibit he saw of American artist Jean-Michel Basquiat's artwork at the Brooklyn Museum in 2005. The resulting picture book won the 2017 Caldecott Medal as well as the Americas Award for Children's and Young Adult Literature and the 2017 Coretta Scott King Illustrator Award from the American Library Association.

Steptoe's other works include illustrating Jimi Sounds Like a Rainbow: A Story of the Young Jimi Hendrix (Clarion Books, 2010) and writing and illustrating In Daddy’s Arms I Am Tall: African Americans Celebrating Fathers (Lee & Low Books, 1997), which also won the Coretta Scott King Illustrator Award and the 1998 Firecracker Alternative Book Award.

== Personal life ==
Steptoe lives in Brooklyn.
