= Heliopolitans =

Fictional group of gods from Marvel Comics

- Heliopolitans in Thor & Hercules: Encyclopaedia Mythologica #1 (September 2009). Art by Kevin Sharpe

Publication information
- Publisher: Marvel Comics
- First appearance: Marvel Tales #96 (June 1950)
- Created by: Stan Lee (Writer); Werner Roth (Artist)

Characteristics
- Place of origin: Celestial Heliopolis
- Notable members: See Members

Heliopolitans are a fictional group of gods, based on Ancient Egyptian deities, appearing in American comic books published by Marvel Comics.

== Publication history ==
Characters based on ancient Egyptian deities were first mentioned in Captain America Comics #20 (November 1942), published by Marvel Comics' predecessor Timely Comics, in which Captain America and Bucky investigate the murder of Colonel Fitzpatrick, who was studying the Book of Thoth while stationed in Egypt. The Heliopolitans' first full Golden Age appearance was in the story "The Terror That Creeps" by Stan Lee and Werner Roth, published in Marvel Tales #96 (June 1950), and involves a man that fails to convince the public that the Great Sphinx of Giza is slowly moving to the edge of the desert, where it will be empowered by Set and destroy mankind. The goddess Bast would later make her first appearance (as a totem) with the Black Panther in Fantastic Four #52 (July 1966), being called only Panther God, in Black Panther vol. 3 # 21 by Christopher Priest and Sal Velutto, it was revealed that the Panther God is Bast. Many of the other deities, including Horus, Isis and Osiris, were introduced in Thor #239 (September 1975). Khonshu, who became associated with Moon Knight, first appeared in Moon Knight #1 (November 1980). Joseph Muszynski argued in his book Everything I Needed to Know About Life I Learned from Marvel Comics that the introduction of Egyptian deities "excited our tendency to enjoy variety" as the pantheon contained multiple gods and personalities as opposed to the Judeo-Christian religions. Ed Strauss contended that Marvel was able to dive into ancient Egyptian religion because it "had long been retired into the realm of mythology" unlike Christianity.

== Fictional history ==
The Heliopolitans were worshipped as deities by the inhabitants of the Nile River Valley from as early as 10,000 BC. According to Heliopolitan legend, the first of these were Gaea (as Neith), the Demiurge (as Nun), and Set (as Apep/Apophis). Neith and Nun sired Atum, the first of the Ogdoad — the old gods. As Neith went about creating mortal life, Set desired to destroy her creations. In turn, Neith called Atum for protection. Atum and Set fought for eons until Atum transformed into the Demogorge and drove Set off. After Set's defeat, Atum begot the Ennead — the new gods, took the name Ra and settled in the sun.

The Ennead resided in the ancient city of Heliopolis until their king Osiris placed mortal pharaohs in charge so that the gods could become less involved with human affairs and relocated themselves to the extradimensional realm of Celestial Heliopolis, known to the ancient Egyptians as "Aaru." As the pharaohs consolidated their rule over Egypt, many of the old gods withdrew to Celestial Heliopolis. Bast instead chose to adopt a realm bordering both Celestial Heliopolis and Ala (or Orun), the home of the Orishas, the West African gods, and established her temple there, within the Panther God Pavilion, serving as a bridge between the Egyptian and West African pantheons. Bast selected the region that would one day become the nation of Wakanda as her patron land. A few, including Bast, Sobek, Sekhmet, Thoth, and Ptah, chose to remain on Earth and were later worshipped in Wakanda. Of these, Bast, Thoth, and Ptah were integrated into The Orisha, the central pantheon, (Note: The Orishas are deities of the Yoruba religion. Yoruba is one of the official languages of Wakanda.) while Sobek and Sekhmet were relegated to lesser, separate cults. Eons ago during the First Blasphemy, Khonshu tries to avenge a prisoner that was killed by Varnae only for Bast to tell Khonshu to stay his hand. Varnae who stole Vibranium from the Fires of Ptah and planned to ascend to godhood. This attracted the attention of Khonshu who met with Bast, Eshu, Gherke, and Ptah during Ra's slumber. He wants the gods in the surrounding realms to be made aware before he retaliates. He gets their support alongside the support of Kokou the Ever-Burning. In the distant past, Bast and Gherke lead the Enneads and the Orishas against Varnae's forces. Kokou confronts Varnae in his temple. The prisoners are evacuated as Bast instructs the black panthers to take the prisoners west and wait for the news of victory.

In Celestial Heliopolis, Seth murdered his brother Osiris in an attempted coup but Osiris' wife Isis, and his sons Horus and Anubis combined their powers to resurrect Osiris. Osiris then dispatched Horus to exact revenge on Seth in a battle that lasted for several hundred years, ending when Seth gained the upper hand and sealed the gods in a pyramid. The trapped gods remained in the pyramid for several millennia until they managed to reach out to the Asgardian god Odin. With help from Odin's son, Thor, they defeated Seth, severing his left hand as they battled, and freed the Heliopolitans. The Heliopolitans had captured a large creature called the Devourer, who later escaped and fought Thor and the Thing.

The gods of Heliopolis, powerless and calling themselves "Lost Ones", joined Thor and Earth Force in fighting Seth and his forces again, and ultimately regained their powers after the apparent death of Seth.

The series Moon Knight: City of the Dead reveals that Heliopolitan Taweret assists in the judgement of souls in Duat and transformed Layla El-Faouly into the latest Scarlet Scarab. Additionally, Anubis becomes the benefactor of the Cult of the Jackal and resurrects deceased Moon Knight enemies Black Spectre, Chainsaw, Master Sniper, Midnight, Plasma, and Taurus, who form the Legion of the Unliving alongside Jackal Knight.

In The Undead Iron Fist, Osiris resurrects the recently deceased Danny Rand as his avatar, bestowing him with new powers and renaming him Ghost Fist. Osiris has Rand undergo a trial to enact his vengeance upon Quan Yaozu before a time limit, or else Rand's soul would be permanently bound to the Underworld. Ghost Fist succeeds and Osiris allows him to remain in the duat until he is needed in the realm of the living again. In the series Deadly Hands of K'un-Lun, Osiris allows Ghost Fist to leave the underworld to prevent the resurrection of Chiyou, an old enemy of his. After the conflict is resolved, Ghost Fist continues his service to Osiris.

== Members ==
- Anubis — The god of the afterlife
- Anuket — The goddess of cataracts of the Nile and Lower Nubia
- Atum — The god of the sun
- Bast — The goddess of pleasure, poetry and dance
- Bes — The god of luck and probability
- Geb — The god of the Earth
- Horus — The god of the Sun
- Isis — The goddess of fertility
- Khonshu — The god of the Moon
- Neith — The goddess of the Earth
- Nun — The god of the watery abyss
- Nut — The goddess of the sky
- Osiris — The god of the dead
- Ptah — The god of craftsmen and architects
- Ra - The king of the Heliopolitans and god of the sun
- Sekhmet — The god of war
- Seth — The god of evil and death
- Sobek - The god of rivers
- Taweret - The goddess of fertility
- Thoth — The god of wisdom

== Other versions ==
Alternate versions of the Heliopolitans from Earth-6160 appear in Ultimate Black Panther. Ra and Khonshu are depicted as members of the Maker's Council, serving as the theocratic rulers of the Upper and Lower Kingdoms of Africa. Just like in the mainstream universe, Bast is the patron goddess of Wakanda.

== In other media ==
=== Marvel Cinematic Universe ===
- The gods Bast and Sekhmet are both mentioned by T'Challa / Black Panther in the 2016 Marvel Cinematic Universe film Captain America: Civil War, with T'Challa explaining, "In my culture, death is not the end. It's more of a stepping-off point. You reach out with both hands, and Bast and Sekhmet, they lead you into the green veld where you can run forever." Bast is again mentioned in the prologue of the 2018 film Black Panther as having helped the first Black Panther become king of Wakanda, and later appears in person in Thor: Love and Thunder portrayed by Akosia Sabet.
- Khonshu and Taweret appears in the live-action Marvel Cinematic Universe (MCU) television series Moon Knight, with Khonshu performed by Karim El-Hakim and voiced by F. Murray Abraham and Taweret voiced and motion-captured by Atonia Salib. Khonshu is an outcast amongst his fellow Egyptian gods for waging a "one-god war on perceived injustices", which necessitates him to find and use his avatar Marc Spector. Taweret guides the souls to Duat and later briefly turns Layla El-Faouly into Scarlet Scarab.
- Bast appears in Thor: Love and Thunder, portrayed by Akosia Sabet.

=== Video games ===
Horus appears in Lego Marvel Super Heroes 2, voiced by Colin McFarlane.
