= Thor: Love and Thunder =

2022 Marvel Studios film

- Theatrical release poster
- Directed by: Taika Waititi
- Written by: Taika Waititi; Jennifer Kaytin Robinson
- Based on: Marvel Comics
- Produced by: Kevin Feige; Brad Winderbaum
- Starring: Chris Hemsworth; Christian Bale; Tessa Thompson; Jaimie Alexander; Taika Waititi; Russell Crowe; Natalie Portman
- Cinematography: Barry Idoine
- Edited by: Matthew Schmidt; Tim Roche; Jennifer Vecchiarello; Peter S. Elliot
- Music by: Michael Giacchino; Nami Melumad
- Production company: Marvel Studios
- Distributed by: Walt Disney Studios Motion Pictures
- Release dates: June 23, 2022 (El Capitan Theatre); July 8, 2022 (United States)
- Running time: 119 minutes
- Country: United States
- Language: English
- Budget: $250 million
- Box office: $760.9 million

Thor: Love and Thunder is a 2022 American superhero film based on Marvel Comics featuring the character Thor. Produced by Marvel Studios and distributed by Walt Disney Studios Motion Pictures, it is the sequel to Thor: Ragnarok (2017) and the 29th film in the Marvel Cinematic Universe (MCU). The film was directed by Taika Waititi, who co-wrote the screenplay with Jennifer Kaytin Robinson, and stars Chris Hemsworth as Thor alongside Christian Bale, Tessa Thompson, Jaimie Alexander, Waititi, Russell Crowe, and Natalie Portman. In the film, Thor tries to find inner peace, but must return to action and recruit Valkyrie (Thompson), Korg (Waititi), and Jane Foster (Portman)—who is now the Mighty Thor—to stop Gorr the God Butcher (Bale) from eliminating all gods.

Hemsworth and Waititi had discussed plans for a sequel to Ragnarok by January 2018. Love and Thunder was announced in July 2019, with Hemsworth, Waititi, and Thompson all set to return, as well as Portman who did not appear in Ragnarok. Waititi wanted to differentiate Love and Thunder from Ragnarok, seeking to make a romance film and 1980s-inspired adventure. He adapted elements from Jason Aaron's run on Thor comic books during the 2010s, which similarly debuted Gorr and saw Foster take on the mantle and powers of Thor whilst under treatment for cancer. Robinson joined to contribute to the script in February 2020, and further casting was revealed later that year including the appearance of the Guardians of the Galaxy. Production was expected to begin in late 2020 but was delayed by the COVID-19 pandemic. Filming ultimately began in January 2021 in Sydney, Australia with Barry Idoine as the director of photography, and concluded at the beginning of June.

Thor: Love and Thunder premiered at the El Capitan Theatre in Hollywood, Los Angeles, on June 23, 2022, and was released in the United States on July 8, as part of Phase Four of the MCU. The film received mixed reviews from critics, who praised the performances of Hemsworth, Bale and Portman, but criticized its visual effects and tonal inconsistencies. The film grossed $760.9 million worldwide, making it the eighth-highest-grossing film of 2022, as well as the second-highest-grossing film in the Thor franchise.

== Plot ==
Gorr and his daughter, Love, the last of their race, struggle in a barren desert. Despite their prayers to their god, Rapu, Love dies. The god-killing Necrosword calls to Gorr, leading him to Rapu's lush realm. After Rapu cruelly mocks and dismisses Gorr's plight, he renounces the god, causing Rapu to start strangling him. The Necrosword offers itself to Gorr, who kills Rapu with it and vows to kill all gods. Gorr is granted the ability to manipulate shadows and produce monsters, but is cursed with impending death and corruption under the sword's influence.

Thor has joined the Guardians of the Galaxy after the Avengers' battle against Thanos. (Note: As depicted in Avengers: Endgame (2019)) He learns of a distress signal from Sif, so he parts ways with the team. He finds an injured Sif, who warns that Gorr's next target is New Asgard. Meanwhile, Dr. Jane Foster, Thor's ex-girlfriend, has been diagnosed with stage four terminal cancer. With medical treatment proving ineffective, she travels to New Asgard hoping that Thor's hammer Mjolnir, which was previously fractured by Hela, (Note: As depicted in Thor: Ragnarok (2017)) might heal her. Due to an enchantment Thor unknowingly placed on it years earlier to protect Foster, Mjolnir reforges and bonds itself to her.

Thor arrives in New Asgard just as Gorr's attack begins. Thor is surprised to find Foster wielding Mjolnir, but teams up with her, Valkyrie, and Korg to fight Gorr. The group thwarts Gorr, but he escapes, kidnapping numerous Asgardian children and imprisoning them in the Shadow Realm. The group travels to Omnipotence City to warn the other gods and ask for their help in creating an army. The leader of the gods, Zeus, is unwilling to help, thinking they can remain safe and hidden from Gorr in the city; he also believes that Gorr will not be able to achieve his stated goal of visiting the realm of Eternity, where he will be granted one wish, presumably to destroy all gods. As a security precaution, Zeus orders the group's capture to prevent them from exposing the city's location to Gorr. When Zeus injures Korg, Thor impales Zeus with his thunderbolt, which Valkyrie steals before they escape to confront Gorr in the Shadow Realm. On the way, Thor learns of Foster's cancer diagnosis.

The group arrives at the Shadow Realm but are unable to locate the children. Foster sees ancient drawings that depict Thor's battle-axe Stormbreaker as a way to summon the Bifrost to enter Eternity, and deduces the trap laid out by Gorr. She throws away Stormbreaker to prevent Gorr from accessing it. However, Gorr overpowers the group and threatens to kill Foster, forcing Thor to summon it back. Gorr steals Stormbreaker and injures Valkyrie before a weakened Foster collapses.

Upon traveling back to New Asgard, Thor discovers that Foster's Thor form is not allowing her body to naturally fight the cancer. Due to this, Thor travels to Eternity's altar alone and using Zeus's thunderbolt, imbues the children with his power to fight Gorr's monsters while he battles Gorr. When Foster senses that Gorr is about to kill Thor, she joins the battle with Mjolnir to save him. They destroy the Necrosword, freeing Gorr from its influence, but the three are brought into Eternity's realm. With Gorr poised to make his wish, Thor implores Gorr to revive his daughter instead of destroying the gods. Thor then leaves Gorr to make his decision and attends to Foster, who succumbs to her illness and dies in his arms. Moved by their display, Gorr wishes for Eternity to revive Love, which it grants. As Gorr dies from the curse, he requests Thor to take care of Love.

In the aftermath, the children return to New Asgard, where Valkyrie and Sif commence their training, and a monument is erected in Foster's memory. Thor adopts Love, who accompanies him in his heroics, with Thor wielding Mjolnir and Love wielding Stormbreaker. In a mid-credits scene, Zeus sends his son Hercules to kill Thor in revenge as he recuperates in Omnipotence City. In a post-credits scene, Foster arrives at the gates of Valhalla, where Heimdall welcomes her.

== Cast ==
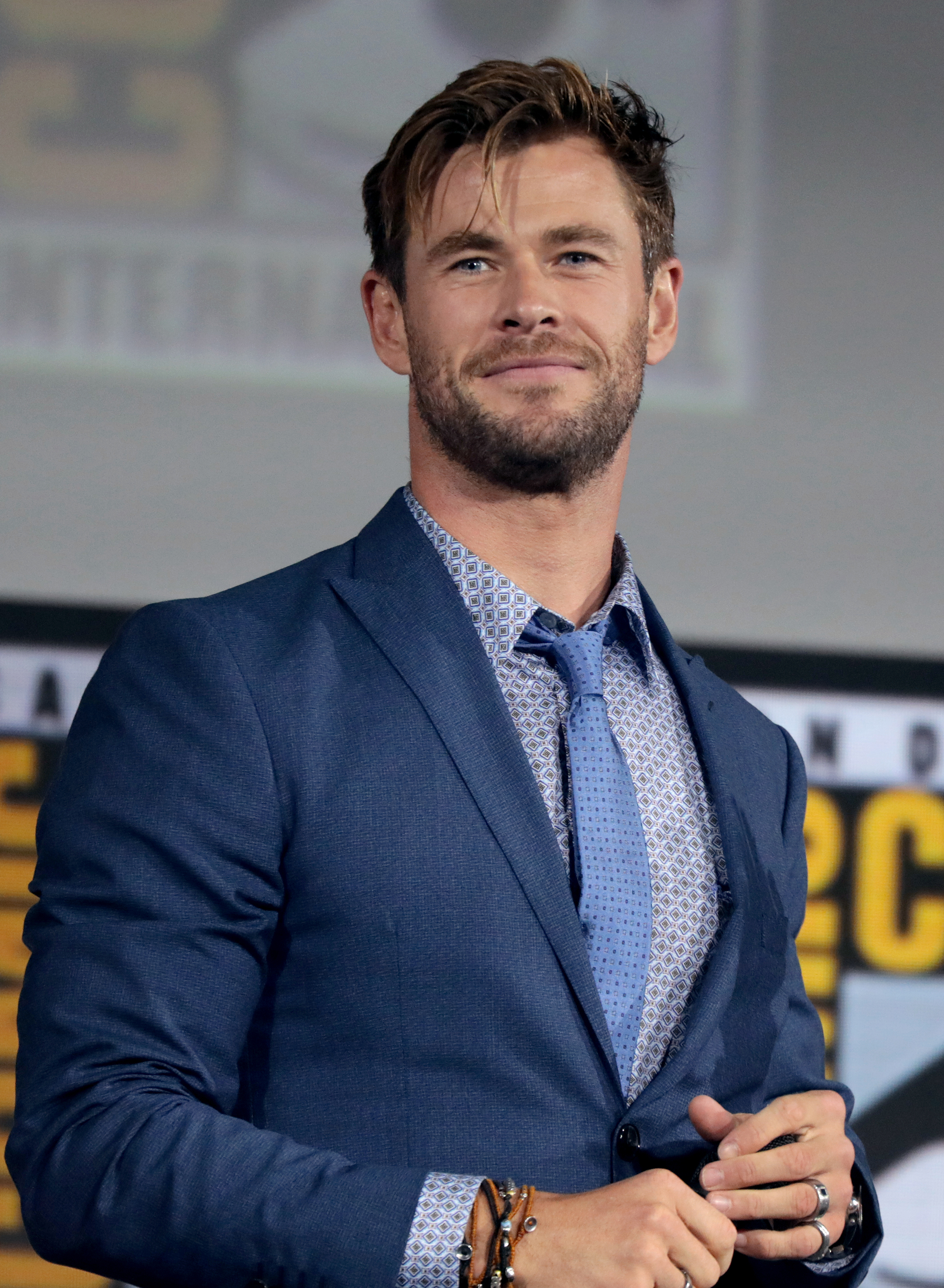
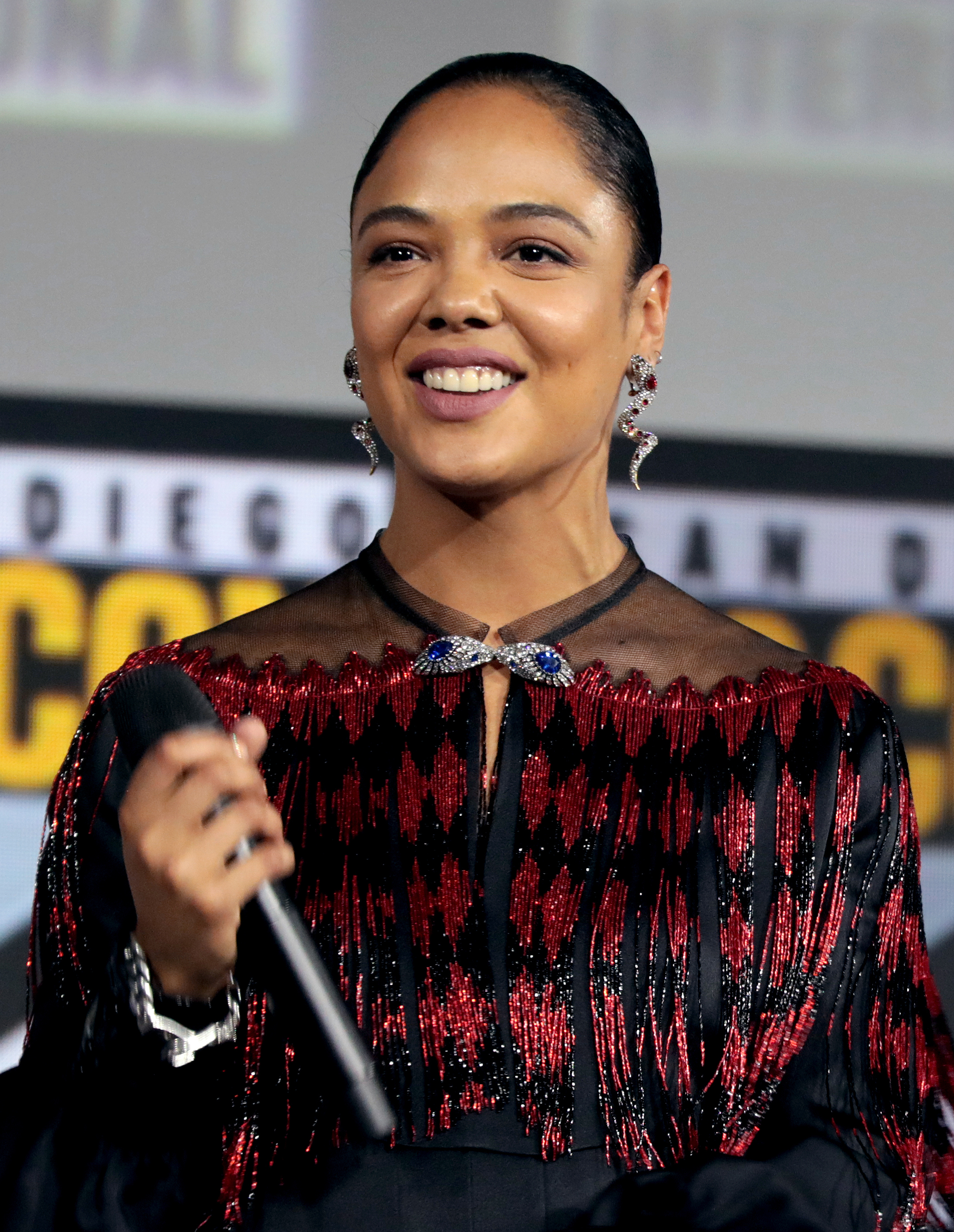
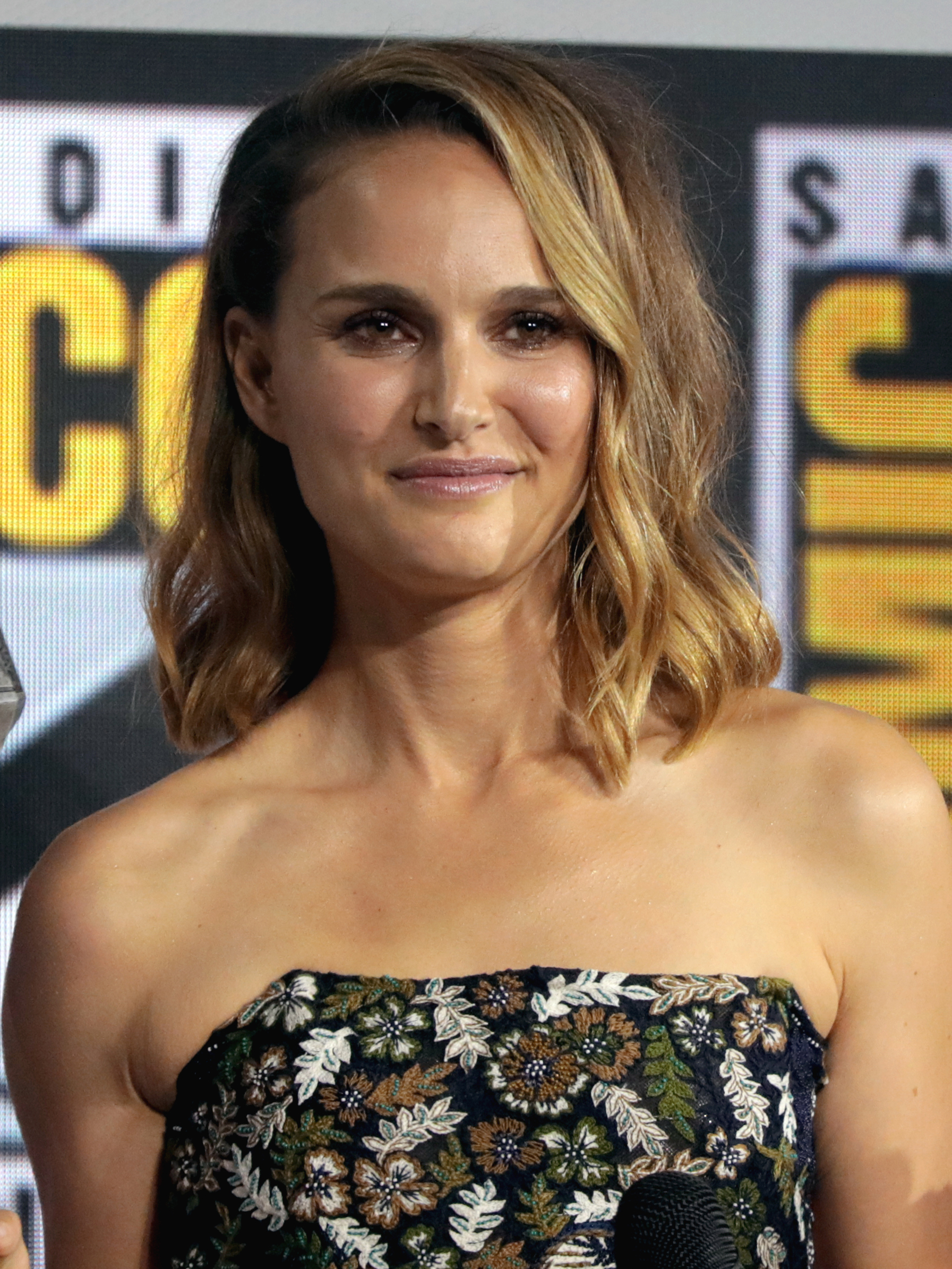
Chris Hemsworth, Tessa Thompson, and Natalie Portman announcing the film at the 2019 San Diego Comic-Con
- Chris Hemsworth as Thor:
  A founding Avenger and the former king of Asgard, based on the Norse mythological deity of the same name. Director Taika Waititi said that Thor is going through a midlife crisis in the film, as he is "just trying to figure out his purpose, trying to figure out exactly who he is and why he's a hero or whether he should be a hero". Thor has a large tattoo on his back that memorializes his family and friends that have previously died. Hemsworth's twin sons Sasha and Tristan portray Thor as a child.
- Christian Bale as Gorr the God Butcher:
  A scarred wielder of the Necrosword and manipulator of shadows who seeks the extinction of the gods. Waititi described Gorr as being "very formidable" and layered. Bale felt the character had a "sort of a Nosferatu slight attitude", and took inspiration from the music video for the Aphex Twin song "Come to Daddy" (1997). Waititi opted to change Gorr's facial features in the film since his original look in the comics resembles Lord Voldemort from the Harry Potter film series. Odd Studio created Gorr's practical makeup.
- Tessa Thompson as Valkyrie:
  The king of New Asgard, based on the mythological being Brynhildr. Thompson and producer Kevin Feige said the character's bisexuality would be addressed in the film. Waititi said Valkyrie had to adjust to the bureaucratic aspects of ruling, away from the battlefield, such as dealing with the infrastructure and economy of New Asgard and hosting delegates from other countries.
- Jaimie Alexander as Sif: An Asgardian warrior and Thor's childhood friend, based on the Norse mythological deity of the same name.
- Taika Waititi as Korg: A Kronan gladiator who befriended Thor. Waititi also voices the Kronan god Ninny of the Nonny.
- Russell Crowe as Zeus:
  The king of the Olympians, based on the Greek mythological deity of the same name. Crowe wanted to perform the role in a Greek accent, but Waititi thought it would sound "too silly", so he had Crowe do takes in both a Greek and British accent, with Waititi suggesting the British accent be similar to the one Crowe used for Maximus Decimus Meridius in the film Gladiator (2000). Waititi finally concluded that Crowe was correct and used the Greek accent in the final film.
- Natalie Portman as Jane Foster / Mighty Thor:
  An astrophysicist and Thor's ex-girlfriend who is undergoing cancer treatment and who gains powers to become the Mighty Thor by wielding a reconstructed Mjolnir, the hammer previously wielded by Thor. Portman, who did not appear in the previous film Thor: Ragnarok (2017), agreed to return after a meeting with Waititi, who said Foster's return to Thor's life after eight years would be a big adjustment for him since she has had another life without him. Waititi added that Foster showing up dressed like Thor would be a "real mindfuck" for him. In preparation for her role, Portman took the Mjolnir prop home to practice using it for her stunts.

Additionally, the Guardians of the Galaxy are featured in the film, with Chris Pratt, Karen Gillan, Dave Bautista, Pom Klementieff, Sean Gunn, Vin Diesel, and Bradley Cooper reprising their respective MCU roles as Peter Quill / Star-Lord, Nebula, Drax the Destroyer, Mantis, Kraglin Obfonteri, Groot, and Rocket. Matt Damon, Sam Neill, and Luke Hemsworth reprise their roles as Asgardian actors respectively playing Loki, Odin, and Thor from Ragnarok, with Melissa McCarthy joining them as an Asgardian actress playing Hela, and McCarthy's husband Ben Falcone as the stage manager. Miek, who previously appeared in Ragnarok and the film Avengers: Endgame (2019) via CGI, is voiced by Stephen Murdoch, while Carly Rees provides the motion capture performance for the character. Also returning from previous MCU media are Kat Dennings and Stellan Skarsgård as Foster's colleagues Darcy Lewis and Erik Selvig, respectively, and Idris Elba as Heimdall in the post-credits scene. Daley Pearson appears as New Asgard tour guide Darryl Jacobson, after first portraying the role in Marvel Studios' Team Thor (2016–2018) short film series. Archive footage from previous MCU films of Tom Hiddleston as Loki, Anthony Hopkins as Odin, Rene Russo as Frigga, Ray Stevenson as Volstagg, Tadanobu Asano as Hogun, and Zachary Levi as Fandral is featured at the beginning of the film. Chanique Greyling portrays a young Frigga during a flashback sequence.

Deities introduced in the film include: Simon Russell Beale as the Olympian god Dionysus, based on the Greek mythological deity of the same name; Jonathan Brugh (who appeared as Deacon Brucke in Waititi's 2014 film What We Do in the Shadows) as Rapu, a god from Gorr's home planet who becomes his first victim; Akosia Sabet as Bast, a goddess who is a member of both the Heliopolitan and Wakandan pantheons, based on the Egyptian mythological deity Bastet; Kuni Hashimoto as the Japanese god Jademurai; Carmen Foon as the Roman goddess Minerva; and Stephen Hunter as the Fur God. Also appearing in the film are Kieron L. Dyer as Axl, Heimdall's son, Chris Hemsworth's daughter India Rose Hemsworth as Love, Gorr's daughter who is adopted by Thor, and Stephen Curry as Yakan, the ruler of the planet Indigarr. Cameos in the film include Bale, Portman, and Waititi's children as New Asgard children; Hemsworth's wife, Elsa Pataky, as the wolf woman who was one of Thor's past lovers; Indiana Evans as one of the Zeusettes; Jenny Morris as a New Asgard citizen; Chloé Gouneau as Foster's mother Elaine in a flashback sequence; Dave Cory as Dwayne, a Kronan who becomes Korg's partner in a romantic relationship; and Brett Goldstein as Zeus's son Hercules in the mid-credits scene.

Jeff Goldblum and Peter Dinklage were both originally set to reprise their respective roles as Grandmaster from previous MCU media and Eitri from the film Avengers: Infinity War (2018), but their scenes were cut from the theatrical release. Lena Headey, Angus Sampson, and Da'Vine Joy Randolph were cast as a coven of witches, with their scene cut as well.

== Production ==
=== Development ===
Shortly after the release of the third Thor film, Thor: Ragnarok, in November 2017, that film's director Taika Waititi and executives from Marvel Studios met to discuss ideas for another film, which was green-lit following the positive responses to Ragnarok. Chris Hemsworth indicated in January 2018 that he was interested in continuing to play Thor in the Marvel Cinematic Universe (MCU), despite his contract with Marvel Studios being set to end with his role in the MCU film Avengers: Endgame (2019). By then, Hemsworth and Waititi had discussed what they would want in a potential fourth Thor film, and Hemsworth said a month later that he would consider returning if there was "another great script". Tessa Thompson, who plays Valkyrie in the MCU films, believed in April 2019 that a pitch had been made for a Ragnarok sequel that involved Waititi returning. Hemsworth said then that he would continue to play Thor for as long as possible, crediting Waititi with revitalizing his interest in the role after he became exhausted and underwhelmed with it prior to making Ragnarok.

In July 2019, Waititi officially signed on to write and direct a fourth Thor film, with Hemsworth expected to reprise his role. Waititi was not interested in repeating what they did with Ragnarok, instead wanting to do "something more interesting for myself to keep the whole thing ignited and to make sure that I'm feeling creatively stimulated". Later that month, at San Diego Comic-Con, Marvel Studios President Kevin Feige announced the film as Thor: Love and Thunder, with a release date of November 5, 2021. Hemsworth and Thompson were confirmed to be returning along with Natalie Portman, reprising her role of Jane Foster from the MCU films Thor (2011) and Thor: The Dark World (2013). Hemsworth, who would also serve as an executive producer, was paid $20 million upfront for the film, an increase from the $15 million upfront salary he earned for each of his appearances in Ragnarok, the film Avengers: Infinity War (2018), and Endgame. Portman agreed to return to the franchise, after her character had not been included in Ragnarok, following a single meeting with Waititi, who was given creative freedom from Marvel Studios to reimagine her role in the film, in which he offered to portray the character in a different and fresh way, with a "license to be adventurous and fun and funny". Thompson and Feige added that Valkyrie's bisexuality would be addressed in the sequel, retroactively making her Marvel Studios' first LGBTQ superhero. Marvel Studios executive Brad Winderbaum was producing the film alongside Feige.

Don Harwin, the Minister for the Arts for the Australian state of New South Wales, announced at the end of July that Thor: Love and Thunder would be filmed at Fox Studios Australia in Sydney back-to-back with the MCU film Shang-Chi and the Legend of the Ten Rings (2021), with work set to begin on Love and Thunder there in March 2020 ahead of an August 2020 filming start. The production was set to receive over AU$24 million (US$18 million) of subsidies from the Australian and New South Wales governments. Marvel Studios vice president David Grant said shooting the two films back-to-back would provide continuous employment for local crews, with Love and Thunder expected to generate over AU$178 million (US$134 million) for the local economy. He added that the studio would work with "local educational institutions in creating internship opportunities". Jeff Goldblum said in August 2019 that there was a chance he could reprise his Ragnarok role of the Grandmaster in the sequel, and Waititi confirmed in October that he would be reprising his own role of Korg from Ragnarok and Endgame. Christian Bale entered talks to join the cast in January 2020, with pre-production expected to begin in April. Thompson confirmed a month later that Bale would star as the villain in the film, while Vin Diesel, who voices Groot in the MCU films, said he had discussed the film with Waititi and had been told the Guardians of the Galaxy would be appearing in it. In early April, Disney shifted much of their Phase Four slate of films due to the COVID-19 pandemic, moving Thor: Love and Thunder's release date to February 18, 2022. Pre-production on the film was delayed due to the pandemic, with Waititi unsure when production would continue. At the end of the month, Disney moved the release date up to February 11, 2022. By July, filming was set to start in early 2021.

==== Writing ====
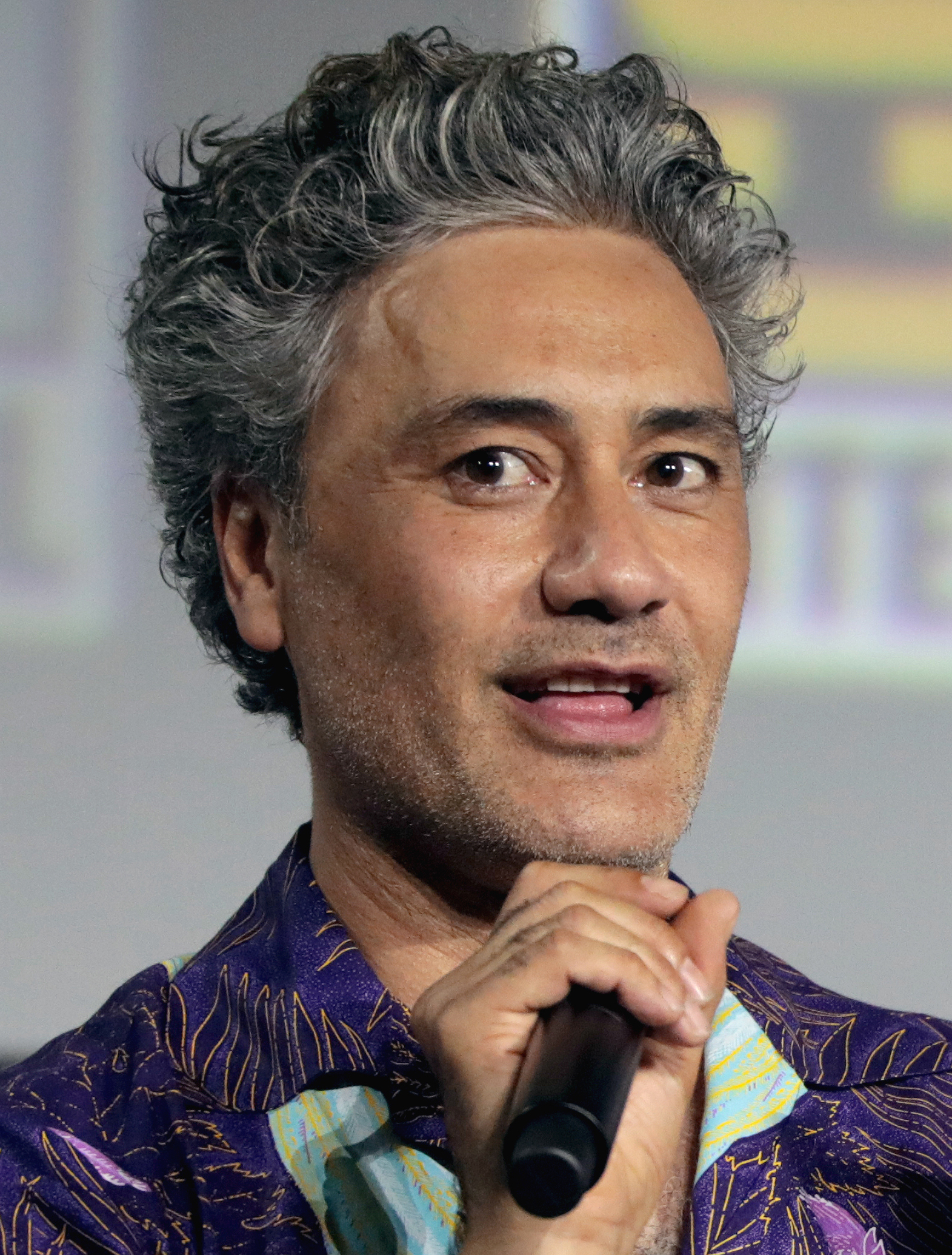
Co-writer and director Taika Waititi at the 2019 San Diego Comic-Con

When announcing the film in July 2019, Waititi said it would adapt elements from Jason Aaron's Mighty Thor comic books by having Foster become a hero called the Mighty Thor. Feige said that the film would include a lot of elements from Marvel comics and that the story line of Foster becoming the Mighty Thor would be an important part, explaining that Marvel considered the Mighty Thor run to be one of the best recent comic books. Waititi read the comic while working on Ragnarok, and when he agreed to direct another Thor film, he told Marvel that he wanted to include Foster as the Mighty Thor. The studio agreed to adapt Aaron's storyline and include Portman following discussions with Waititi about where the story could lead. Waititi said they stuck close to Foster's storyline from those comics and tried to adapt its best parts. He also explained that Thor having his axe Stormbreaker and then seeing his hammer Mjolnir return "in the hands of someone else" and "no longer [being] his hammer" would explore "the idea that someone's taking his place", which he felt some fans assumed would occur, but did not believe this as such. Aaron served as a consultant on the film. A. C. Bradley, the creator and head writer of the animated series What If...? (2021–2024), pitched an episode of that series in which Foster would have become Thor, but the idea was rejected because the storyline was already being used for Love and Thunder.

In August, Waititi was reported to have completed a script for the film, but he denied this later that month. While promoting his film Jojo Rabbit (2019) in October, Waititi said he had completed the first draft of the screenplay, but the story would change throughout filming and editing. He was unsure if the film would include the storyline from Aaron's run in which Foster suffers from breast cancer, which he said was a powerful part of the comics. Portman later said Foster's treatment from cancer would be explored in the film. Waititi added that Marvel was still discussing how much time would pass between Endgame and Love and Thunder, and that this would affect whether Thor is still carrying the extra weight he is depicted with in Endgame, which earned him the nicknames "Fat Thor" and "Bro Thor". Waititi did note that he wanted to "keep changing it up with Thor. He's so interesting when he's changing all the time." The film is set eight years after Thor and Foster broke up, around 2024. Waititi also acknowledged fans "shipping" Valkyrie with Brie Larson's Carol Danvers / Captain Marvel but said he did not intend to include a romantic relationship between the pair because he would rather surprise fans than do something by popular demand. Jennifer Kaytin Robinson was hired to work on the film's screenplay with Waititi in February 2020. Waititi received sole screenplay credit on the film's theatrical poster, with Robinson credited with him for the story, before the final credits from the Writers Guild of America credited both Waititi and Robinson as the film's writers.

Thor: Love and Thunder follows Thor as he attempts to find inner peace, but must return to action and recruit Valkyrie, Korg, and Foster to stop Gorr the God Butcher from eliminating all gods. Four or five drafts of the screenplay had been completed by mid-April 2020, when Waititi said the sequel was "so over the top now in the very best way" and would make Ragnarok look like a "run of the mill, very safe film" by doubling down on its crazier aspects. He wanted to up the ante and make the film as if "10-year-olds told us what should be in a movie and we said yes to every single thing." Waititi added that the film would explore more of Korg's Kronan culture and indicated that it would include the Space Sharks alien race from the comics. He expressed interest in featuring the character Beta Ray Bill, but was unsure at that point if he would.

At the end of July, Waititi said they had been writing the script off and on for over a year and he was taking another pass on it that week. He said it was very romantic, and explained that he wanted to make a romance film because he wanted to make something that he had not done before, and, as such, wrote the film as a love story. He later said the film was "about love, with superheroes and outer space", and that he wanted to "embrace this thing that I was always a bit dismissive of, and explore this idea of love, and show characters who do believe in love". That October, Hemsworth said Waititi was still writing the script and expressed his excitement for doing something drastically different with his character, as he did in his previous three MCU films. Waititi later described Love and Thunder as the craziest film he had ever made and explained that each element was intended to not make sense. He said it would have its own "distinct flavour" from Ragnarok, which he called a 1970s space opera with a festive, party-like tone. He saw this film as a 1980s adventure, taking inspiration from posters for films such as Conan the Barbarian (1982) and The Beastmaster (1982) as well as art seen on vans in Venice Beach, with the works of Jack Kirby and the covers of "old" Mills & Boon romance novels also serving as "visual touchstones" for the film. He said it was not serious or dramatic, but it did explore themes such as love, loss, and "our place in the world" while making the characters ask themselves the questions: "What is your purpose? What is the reason that you're a hero, and what do you do when you have these powers?" The film's ending involving Love underwent multiple revisions.

James Gunn, the writer and director of the three Guardians of the Galaxy films, consulted on how the Guardians characters were used in Love and Thunder, with Gunn and Waititi discussing where the characters were going before Waititi began writing. Waititi read Gunn's script for Guardians of the Galaxy Vol. 3 (2023), which is set after Love and Thunder, and then Gunn read Waititi's script and shared his thoughts, asking for some adjustments to be made. In January 2021, Gunn said the Guardians were "in great hands" with Waititi, and he later praised Waititi's work on the script. Chris Pratt said Love and Thunder would continue the rivalry between Guardians leader Peter Quill / Star-Lord and Thor that was established in Infinity War and Endgame, while Karen Gillan said Waititi brought out the "bonkers side" of Nebula through her "pure aggression".

=== Pre-production ===
Pre-production began in Australia by October 2020. A month later, Chris Pratt was revealed to be reprising his role as Guardians of the Galaxy leader Peter Quill / Star-Lord. Given the ensemble nature of the cast, industry insiders described the film as feeling like "Avengers 5". In December, Feige revealed that the film's release was delayed again, this time to May 6, 2022, and he announced that Bale would portray Gorr the God Butcher in the film. Jaimie Alexander was also revealed to be reprising her MCU role in Love and Thunder, returning as Sif from the first two Thor films after not appearing in Ragnarok, alongside other members and allies of the Guardians of the Galaxy: Pom Klementieff as Mantis, Dave Bautista as Drax the Destroyer, Karen Gillan as Nebula, and Sean Gunn as Kraglin Obfonteri; Gunn also provides on set reference for Guardians member Rocket. Matt Damon was set to appear, after making a cameo appearance in Ragnarok as an Asgardian actor playing Loki. He received special permission to enter Australia, despite the country's strict travel restrictions during the pandemic, since Love and Thunder was providing jobs for Australians. This prompted criticism as it was perceived that Damon, who traveled with his family, received preferential treatment to enter when many Australian nationals abroad were unable to return to the country. Sam Neill—who appeared alongside Damon in Ragnarok as an actor playing Odin—said there was a good chance he would be in the film as well, as long as he could travel from New Zealand to Australia during the pandemic.

Mayes C. Rubeo served as the film's costume designer, after doing so for Ragnarok. For Love and Thunder, Rubeo focused on making clothes that reflect faithfully to the comics and fit Thor's mythology. Making of Foster's costume required 10 set constructions. Rubeo created Foster's costume "based on the old comics" while maintaining her heroic attributes, with advanced technology that was "flexible and versatile". As Portman was vegan, it was important to Rubeo that she make Foster's costume out of non-animal materials such as plastic and other synthetic materials. To differentiate Foster from Thor, Rubeo added "silver metallic and deeper red hues" to Foster's costume since Thor's one used "new colors", as well as her winged helmet. Rubeo created 25 costumes for Hemsworth. These included many types of Thor's typical uniform which Rubeo integrated "more vibrant colors, like reds, blues and metallic golds to match the exaggerated aesthetic of the film." Thor's 1980s costume was influenced by Kurt Russell's character Jack Burton in the film Big Trouble in Little China (1986), and his other costumes made more "flashier" compared to Foster's. Gorr's costume—unlike those of most of the characters in Love and Thunder, which were taken directly from the comics—was redesigned for the film, with Rubeo using classical sculptures as a source of inspiration for his outfit during the draping process. For a "great contrast to vibrant colors" used by other characters, Rubeo applied white to his costume rather than black, reflecting his supernatural nature. Rubeo bought 50 yards (46 m) of linen to hide the costume's wire rigger and the heating, ventilation, and air conditioning system; this prevented Bale from overheating. Leather masters Augusto and Giampaolo Grassi were hired to make a breastplate for Zeus' costume using gold leaf.

=== Filming ===
Principal photography began on January 26, 2021, at Fox Studios Australia in Sydney, under the working title The Big Salad. Barry "Baz" Idoine serves as the cinematographer, after previously working with Waititi on the Disney+ Star Wars series The Mandalorian (2019–2023). Filming was delayed from an initial August 2020 start date due to the COVID-19 pandemic. Industrial Light & Magic provided the same StageCraft virtual production technology used on The Mandalorian which Waititi directed an episode of, creating a custom volume space at Fox Studios Australia. It featured more LED panels and offered a higher resolution than the original volume created for The Mandalorian. Waititi also used Satellite Lab's PlateLight technology (after previously using their Dynamiclight technology on Ragnarok), which is a special rig designed to capture multiple lighting set-ups simultaneously within a single shot at a high frame rate, allowing Waititi to select which lighting set up he would like in post-production. Waititi believed he was able to shoot Love and Thunder more efficiently than Ragnarok due to already having experience working on a Marvel Studios film.

Filming occurred at Centennial Park in Sydney in early February, with Klementieff, Gillan, Bautista, and Pratt completing their scenes shortly afterward. In early March, set photos revealed Damon and Neill were reprising their roles as the Asgardian actors playing Loki and Odin, along with Luke Hemsworth in his Ragnarok role as the actor playing Thor. Melissa McCarthy was also revealed to be portraying an actress playing Hela alongside her husband Ben Falcone in an undisclosed role; these cameos were for a sequence where actors reenact scenes from Ragnarok. Damon filmed his part over two days. Alexander completed filming her scenes by the end of the month, while Goldblum was confirmed to appear as the Grandmaster, and Russell Crowe was revealed to be appearing in the film in what was described as a "fun cameo". Crowe finished filming his scenes in late April, around which time it was confirmed that he would play Zeus in the film. Crowe was originally set to play Satan in the film before his character was changed to Zeus. Septimus Caton would later be cast as Satan and had makeup and prosthetic tests done, but the character does not appear in the film. At the beginning of May, Waititi said there were four weeks left of shooting, while Idoine said he would continue work on the film through the end of 2021. Filming wrapped on June 1, 2021, by which point Neill had revealed that singer Jenny Morris would appear in the film, making a cameo as a New Asgard citizen. Goldblum and Peter Dinklage, who was set to reprise his role as Eitri from Infinity War, had their scenes cut from the theatrical release, as did Lena Headey, Angus Sampson, and Da'Vine Joy Randolph, who were cast as a coven of "very funny and kind of insane" witches who guide Thor in the underworld.

=== Post-production ===
Waititi said in early June 2021 that post-production would be completed by February 2022. Later in June, Diesel was confirmed to be reprising his voice role as Groot. In October 2021, the film's release date was delayed to July 8, 2022, while Simon Russell Beale was revealed to have been cast in an undisclosed role that was subsequently confirmed to be the Olympian god Dionysus, though the scene Beale appeared in was ultimately cut from the final film and the actor was relegated to an extra role in Love and Thunder. Additional photography for the film took place in early 2022. At the start of March, further reshoots were revealed to be happening "in the coming weeks", and were said to have begun with Bale by the week of March 18. The teaser trailer released in April confirmed that Bradley Cooper would be reprising his MCU role as the voice of Rocket in the film, and Akosia Sabet was revealed to be appearing as the goddess Bast the following month. Following the appearance of Brett Goldstein in the film's mid-credits scene as Hercules, Waititi revealed in July 2022 that Feige "really wanted him" to be cast for that role.

External videos
- Marvel Studios' Thor: Love and Thunder – End Credits Main On End Title Sequence presents the film's main-on-end title sequence, YouTube video from Perception's channel

Additional characters appearing in the film include: Falligar the Behemoth, one of the gods slain by Gorr; the cosmic wish-granting entity Eternity; Thor's magical goats Toothgnasher and Toothgrinder, based on the Norse mythological animals Tanngrisnir and Tanngnjóstr; and Warsong, Valkyrie's winged steed. The latter was renamed from Aragorn as in the comics to Warsong for Love and Thunder, after previously appearing unnamed in Ragnarok and Endgame. Waititi had planned to have Jesus make a cameo appearance as part of a cutaway gag in the Omnipotence City sequence, after Valkyrie mentioned a "God of Carpentry". The character Cyttorak was considered to appear in the film as one of the deities seen in Omnipotence City, but the idea was scrapped. Storyboards by artist Anthony Lee Winn for Love and Thunder suggest that the characters Galactus, Fin Fang Foom, and Shuma-Gorath were also considered for inclusion in the film; Shuma-Gorath previously appeared in the MCU film Doctor Strange in the Multiverse of Madness (2022) under the name Gargantos.

Visual effects for the film were created by Wētā FX, Rising Sun Pictures, Framestore, Industrial Light & Magic, Method Studios, Luma Pictures, Raynault VFX, Base FX, EDI Effetti Digitali Italiani, Mammal Studios, Fin Design + Effects, and Cinesite. Matthew Schmidt, Peter S. Elliot, Tim Roche, and Jennifer Vecchiarello served as the film's editors, while Jake Morrison served as the visual effects supervisor. Perception designed the film's main-on-end title sequence, drawing inspiration from 1980s rock band logos and designing approximately 250 custom fonts for the sequence.

== Music ==
In December 2021, Michael Giacchino revealed that he would be scoring the film; he previously scored the MCU film Doctor Strange (2016) and the MCU Spider-Man trilogy for Marvel Studios, as well as Waititi's previous film Jojo Rabbit (2019). A soundtrack album, featuring Giacchino's original themes along with the score composed by him and Nami Melumad, was released by Hollywood Records and Marvel Music on July 6, 2022. The single "Mama's Got a Brand New Hammer", the film's main suite, was released on June 30. Waititi wanted the music to reflect the same aesthetic of the film with its "bombastic, loud, colorful palette". "Sweet Child o' Mine" by Guns N' Roses is featured in the film, given Guns N' Roses is one of Waititi's favorite bands, and helped "reflect the sort of crazy adventure that we're [visually] presenting"; the song was also used in the film's marketing. The film features the song "Rainbow in the Dark" by Dio, according to Wendy Dio, widow of band member Ronnie James Dio.

== Marketing ==
Lego sets and Hasbro figures based on the film were revealed in February 2022, with additional Lego sets and Funko Pops revealed that April. The teaser trailer was released on April 18, and commentators discussed its ending, which debuted Portman's Foster in the Mighty Thor costume and wielding a restored version of Thor's hammer Mjolnir. Marco Vito Oddo of Collider and Ryan Parker from The Hollywood Reporter highlighted the use of "Sweet Child o' Mine", which Oddo felt indicated Waititi would "keep the hard rock aesthetics that helped Thor: Ragnarok become a huge success", while Parker called it a "bright, stylish, fun trailer [that] sets a tone for the film in true Taika Waititi form". Justin Harp of Digital Spy felt the humor from Ragnarok was "clearly back in this film too", while Tom Power of TechRadar felt the trailer was a "superhero, intergalactic glam rock feast for the senses" and contained intriguing footage that did a good job of teasing the film. Both The Ringer's Daniel Chin and Empire's Sophie Butcher highlighted the trailer's focus on Thor's journey of self-discovery as well as the lack of footage of Bale's Gorr. Chin remarked that the trailer was "dedicated to catching up with Thor as he rediscovers himself", and was excited for Portman's performance as Foster. He thought the trailer was a "far cry from the Thor we witnessed over a decade ago, as the franchise has transformed into a full-blown space comedy". Butcher felt the trailer's introspection was not surprising due to the film being set after Endgame, and said the trailer was brief but exciting. The trailer had 209 million global views in its first 24 hours, becoming the seventh most viewed trailer in that time period.

A second trailer was released on May 23, during Game 4 of the 2022 NBA Eastern Conference finals. Many commentators highlighted Bale's appearance as Gorr the God Butcher in the trailer. Eric Francisco of Inverse noted the similar comedic tone from Ragnarok while adding "some darker shades" with the inclusion of Gorr. He said Bale brought an "absolutely terrifying vision of Gorr the God Butcher to the screen", adding that it appears Hemsworth was ready to pass the mantle of Thor to Portman. Jennifer Ouellette of Ars Technica noted that Gorr's scenes featured a different color palette, being shown in "primarily gray tones", which she felt made the contrast between other characters "more stark". Zach Seemayer from Entertainment Tonight felt that it "gives fans everything they've been hoping for from the brief flashes of important moments from the first trailer in April", citing scenes featuring Portman's the Mighty Thor, Thor "living up to his 'Space Viking' title", and Gorr's footage. Similarly, The A.V. Club's Sam Barsanti and William Hughes also highlighted Portman and Hemsworth's Thor, Gorr's appearance, and other comedic moments in the trailer, such as when Thor is nude after Crowe's Zeus exposes his disguise. Scott Mendelson of Forbes called the trailer "the real deal" compared to the teaser, and noted similarities with the Masters of the Universe franchise. He speculated that Thor and Foster would be "pining" for each other despite it being 11 years after their first encounter, and called it "a little depressing", as he hoped the two "A+ dating specimens would have moved on". He also highlighted how Gorr's scenes played with color and contrast, and the "interplay" between Foster and Valkyrie. Footage from the film was also featured in the 2022 CineEurope presentation.

Ulta Beauty partnered with Marvel Studios to create a makeup collection based on the film. On July 9, 2022, Waititi and Thompson appeared on Vanity Fair's Notes on a Scene series, analysing the "Taste the Rainbow" scene. The video was met with criticism for what some viewers perceived as Waititi and Thompson "mocking" the visual effects, on the same day that multiple VFX artists who worked for Marvel had spoken out against being "underpaid" and "overworked" by the studio's productions.

== Release ==
=== Theatrical ===
Thor: Love and Thunder premiered at the El Capitan Theatre in Hollywood, Los Angeles, on June 23, 2022. The film was theatrically released in Australia on July 6, 2022, in the United Kingdom, Ireland, and New Zealand on July 7, and in the United States on July 8, 2022, in 4DX, RealD 3D, IMAX, ScreenX, and Dolby Cinema. It was previously set for release on November 5, 2021, but was delayed to February 18, 2022, due to the COVID-19 pandemic. It was then moved up a week to February 11 once Doctor Strange in the Multiverse of Madness was rescheduled from November 2021 to March 2022, and delayed once again to May 6, 2022, in December 2020, before shifting to the July 2022 date in October 2021. It is part of Phase Four of the MCU. The El Capitan Theatre hosted two sensory inclusive screenings of the film in July 2022, featuring expedited check in, a "calming" lobby, reduced capacity, and gift bags for guests with items to aid with anxiety.

The film was not released in Malaysia, Brunei, Kuwait, Bahrain, Saudi Arabia, Egypt, Oman, Qatar, and Jordan due to containing LGBT elements. Variety reported that the Malaysian release did not happen because Disney refused to make cuts to the film requested by the Film Censorship Board of Malaysia. The Malaysian government confirmed that this was due to LGBT elements not being cut from the film. However, the film became available on Disney+ in the Middle East region on September 8, 2022.

=== Home media ===
Thor: Love and Thunder was released on Disney+ on September 8, 2022, part of Disney+ Day, with the option to view the theatrical version of the film or an IMAX Enhanced version. It was released by Walt Disney Studios Home Entertainment on Ultra HD Blu-ray, Blu-ray, and DVD on September 27. The home media includes audio commentary, deleted scenes, a gag reel, and various behind-the-scenes featurettes. According to the streaming aggregator JustWatch, Thor: Love and Thunder was the 3rd most streamed film in the United States in 2022.

Nielsen Media Research, which records streaming viewership on U.S. television screens, calculated that Thor: Love and Thunder was watched for 1.5 billion minutes from September 5—11, 2022, making it the most-streamed film of the week. The following week, from September 12–18, 2022, it garnered 621 million minutes of watch time, ranking as the most-streamed film for the second week in a row.

== Reception ==
=== Box office ===
Thor: Love and Thunder grossed $343.3 million in the United States and Canada, and $417.7 million in other territories, for a worldwide total of $760.9 million. It is the eighth-highest-grossing film of 2022. The film's opening weekend earned $303.3 million globally, of which IMAX contributed $23 million, making it the third-largest July debut of all-time for the format. Deadline Hollywood calculated the film's net profit as $103 million, accounting for production budgets, marketing, talent participations, and other costs; box office grosses and home media revenues placed it ninth on their list of 2022's "Most Valuable Blockbusters".

In the United States and Canada, the film was projected to gross $140–167 million from 4,375 theatres in its opening weekend, along with a total gross of $345–420 million. The film earned $69.5 million on its first day, which included $29 million from Thursday night previews. This marked the second-highest opening day and preview night of 2022, behind fellow MCU film Doctor Strange in the Multiverse of Madness, as well as the fifth-highest opening day ever for an MCU film. Its opening weekend earned $144.2 million, which was the largest debut of the Thor franchise, the twelfth-largest for the MCU, and the third-largest for 2022, behind Multiverse of Madness ($187.4 million) and Jurassic World Dominion ($145 million). Of the $144.2 million figure, over $13.8 million came from IMAX, making it the fifth-highest July debut of all-time for the format domestically. Love and Thunder was also the sixth film in the COVID-19 pandemic to earn over 10 million theater admissions in its opening weekend. Its second weekend grossed $46.6 million, a decline of nearly 68%, representing one of the MCU's largest sophomore weekend drops. Deadline Hollywood attributed this to its CinemaScore grade and generally mixed reception from critics and audiences. In its third weekend the film made $22.6 million, finishing second behind newcomer Nope.

Outside of North America, Love and Thunder grossed $15.7 million from 17 markets on its opening day, surpassing the first-day overall results of Thor: Ragnarok (2017) by 39%. Its weekend gross was $159.2 million from 47 markets, making it the MCU's ninth-largest overseas debut ever and the third-largest for any Hollywood film released in the COVID-19 pandemic. It surpassed Ragnarok's opening by 19%. IMAX contributed $9.2 million to the weekend, becoming the third-largest July debut ever overseas. It also set several pandemic box office milestones in its opening weekend, marking the second-highest pandemic opening in Australia, New Zealand and the Philippines, while earning the third-highest in numerous territories, including Brazil, Italy, Thailand, Singapore and Argentina. As of July 24, 2022, the film's largest markets are the United Kingdom ($31.5 million), Australia ($25.5 million), Mexico ($23.2 million), South Korea ($22.3 million), and Brazil ($17.2 million).

=== Critical response ===
The review aggregator website Rotten Tomatoes reported an approval rating of 64%, with an average rating of 6.4/10, based on 448 reviews. The site's critics consensus reads: "In some ways, Thor: Love and Thunder feels like Ragnarok redux – but overall, it offers enough fast-paced fun to make this a worthy addition to the MCU." On Metacritic, the film has a weighted average score of 57 out of 100, based on 64 critics, indicating "mixed or average" reviews. Audiences polled by CinemaScore gave the film an average grade of "B+" on an A+ to F scale, and PostTrak reported 77% of audience members gave it a positive score, with 63% saying they would definitely recommend it.

In early reactions to the film, Screen Rant noted that the performances from Christian Bale and Natalie Portman were praised. Owen Gleiberman of Variety said there are "many words to describe [Thor: Love and Thunder]", stating "comedy is all part of the package" that made Ragnarok "such a genuine Marvel wildflower." Gleiberman wrote that the film "sustains its freshness" to the end, although it started with a "more awkward" first act with the Guardians of the Galaxy. He also praised Gorr's characterization–a "power[ful introduction]"–and concluded the review by saying he felt "moved" by the end. David Ehrlich of IndieWire praised the film for its light tone and humorous moments, writing that "[Taika] Waititi continues to brighten up the Thor movies with his own flavor of wackiness, which is as welcome here as it was grating in Jojo Rabbit." However, he noted that the film "is clouded by its uncertain place in the universe from the moment it starts". Nick Allen at RogerEbert.com gave the film 3 out of 4 stars, stating that it was "more or less a victory lap for all that [Waititi] achieved with his previous Marvel film, the often hilarious, rousing, and plainly refreshing Thor: Ragnarok. And while it has too many familiar flourishes and jokes, this entertaining sequel is still a force for good, with enough visual ambition and heart in front of and behind the camera to stand on its own." He praised Natalie Portman's performance that "conveys why it's great to see Jane again" and Christian Bale's "striking" role that he considered as the "closest we'll get to seeing him play Pennywise the Clown, with a dash of Voldemort, but tethered to the same humility [he] brings to his most human, humbled characters."

Todd Gilchrist at The A.V. Club graded the film 'B', feeling that it did "[revisit] the cheeky, sentimental tone of the nearly universally beloved Thor: Ragnarok, and propels its eponymous hero into new adventures that bring full circle a journey that started with the very first, much-less-beloved Thor back in 2011." He praised Portman and Bale's performances, with the latter's character being considered "the most interesting and sympathetic Marvel adversary since Michael B. Jordan's Killmonger in Black Panther", and Waititi's "distinctive imagery [in the film] that may disturb and upset some viewers", outpacing Sam Raimi's accomplishments in Doctor Strange in the Multiverse of Madness (2022). Leah Greenblatt at Entertainment Weekly also gave a similar grade, feeling that although "its cheerful melee of starry cameos, in-jokes, and Cliffs-Notes mythology, feels a lot like franchise fatigue, it also has frequent moments of gonzo charm, thanks largely to the Technicolor lunacy of writer-director [Waititi] and a cast that seems inordinately game to follow his lead."

David Rooney of The Hollywood Reporter stated, "The movie feels weightless, flippant, instantly forgettable, sparking neither love nor thunder." David Sims of The Atlantic felt the film delivered a "usual lightning-streaked action and tossed-off gags, but this time, there's not enough heft behind the flashiness." He found it a "hasty-feeling mess of a movie" and "disappointing given that it's directed by [Waititi]", although he praised Bale's and Russell Crowe's performances. David Fear of Rolling Stone felt the film was "oddly unengaging; even the love and death aspects often feel like cold transmissions from distant sources." He saw it as a mess due to the "collision of competing tones, subplots, conceptual big swings and chaos masquerading as pathos". Eric Francisco at Inverse found Chris Hemsworth's Thor in the film becoming "meandering, left in the purgatory of a roundabout tale that makes some sense on paper but in execution fails to maintain viscosity", feeling that Marvel "doesn't know what to do with [the character] anymore." He felt that despite "striv[ing] for an emotional story about loss and love, the movie gets in its own way with tiresome relentless comedy, distracted plotting, and uneven tone." Richard Roeper of the Chicago Sun-Times gave the film 2 out of 4 stars, calling it "one of the goofiest and least consequential sagas in MCU history—an allegedly wild and wacky but ultimately disappointing and disjointed chapter in the ongoing story of the God of Thunder, who seems to get more clueless with each passing movie."

At the London premiere Q&A, in response to the question "How gay will the film be?" Waititi exclaimed that it would be "super gay"; critics and moviegoers who saw the film expressed disappointment that this statement was false and that Marvel queerbaited the audience. Jade King of TheGamer felt expectations from queer audiences for prominent "LGBTQ+ characters and themes" in Thor: Love and Thunder were not met, writing that "the film's creators have been out there talking up the LGBTQ+ representation when it isn't really a massive part of the experience. [...] it's time to temper your expectations and stop letting Marvel continue to queerbait us into disappointment."

In June 2023, Hemsworth commented on the film's response, stating: "I think we just had too much fun. It just became too silly. It's always hard being in the center of it and having any real perspective [...] you just don't know how people are going to respond." He later reflected on his own performance, believing he had become "a parody of [himself]" with the improv and "wackiness" of the film, and that he "didn’t stick the landing".

=== Accolades ===
Accolades received by Thor: Love and Thunder
Award	Date of ceremony	Category	Recipient(s)	Result	Ref.
AACTA Awards	December 7, 2022	Best Visual Effects or Animation	Jake Morrison, Lisa Marra, Dan Oliver, Dan Bethell, and Ian Cope	Nominated	
AACTA Awards	December 7, 2022	Audience Choice Award for Best Film	Thor: Love and Thunder	Nominated	
AACTA Awards	December 7, 2022	Audience Choice Award for Best Actor	Chris Hemsworth	Nominated	
Costume Designers Guild Awards	February 27, 2023	Excellence in Sci-Fi/Fantasy Film	Mayes C. Rubeo	Nominated	
Critics' Choice Super Awards	March 16, 2023	Best Superhero Movie	Thor: Love and Thunder	Nominated	
Critics' Choice Super Awards	March 16, 2023	Best Actress in a Superhero Movie	Natalie Portman	Nominated	
Golden Trailer Awards	June 29, 2023	Best Comedy	Thor: Love and Thunder (Buddha Jones)	Nominated	
Golden Trailer Awards	June 29, 2023	Best Fantasy Adventure	Thor: Love and Thunder (Buddha Jones)	Nominated	
Golden Trailer Awards	June 29, 2023	Best Animation/Family TV Spot (for a Feature Film)	Thor: Love and Thunder (Buddha Jones)	Nominated	
Golden Trailer Awards	June 29, 2023	Best Fantasy Adventure TV Spot (for a Feature Film)	Thor: Love and Thunder (Buddha Jones)	Nominated	
Golden Trailer Awards	June 29, 2023	Best Digital – Fantasy Adventure	"Colour War"	Nominated	
Golden Trailer Awards	June 29, 2023	Best BTS/EPK for a Feature Film (Under 2 minutes)	"A Taika Waititi Adventure" (Tiny Hero)	Nominated	
Hollywood Music in Media Awards	November 16, 2022	Best Original Score in a Sci-Fi/Fantasy Film	Michael Giacchino (Note: Also for Spider-Man: No Way Home (2021) and The Batman (2022))	Nominated	
Nickelodeon Kids' Choice Awards	March 4, 2023	Favorite Movie Actor	Chris Hemsworth	Nominated	
Nickelodeon Kids' Choice Awards	March 4, 2023	Favorite Movie Actress	Natalie Portman	Nominated	
People's Choice Awards	December 6, 2022	Movie of 2022	Thor: Love and Thunder	Nominated	
People's Choice Awards	December 6, 2022	Action Movie of 2022	Thor: Love and Thunder	Nominated	
People's Choice Awards	December 6, 2022	Male Movie Star of 2022	Chris Hemsworth	Won	
People's Choice Awards	December 6, 2022	Action Movie Star of 2022	Chris Hemsworth	Nominated	
Saturn Awards	October 25, 2022	Best Superhero Film	Thor: Love and Thunder	Nominated	
Saturn Awards	October 25, 2022	Best Film Costume	Mayes C. Rubeo	Nominated	
Saturn Awards	October 25, 2022	Best Film Make-up	Matteo Silvi and Adam Johansen	Nominated	

== Documentary special ==
In February 2021, the documentary series Marvel Studios: Assembled was announced. The special on this film, "The Making of Thor: Love and Thunder", was released on Disney+ on September 8, 2022, part of Disney+ Day.

== Future ==
Waititi was unaware that the tagline "Thor will return" was added to the end of the film. Waititi was open to directing another Thor film if Hemsworth was also involved, stating the story would need to be "something surprising and unexpected", suggesting a low-budget road trip film with no fight scenes, similar to Nebraska (2013). Hemsworth hoped that a future installment would have a "drastically different tone" that would "close the book" on the character. In June 2023, Hemsworth said informal conversations had discussed potential ideas for future appearances for the character. He also explained that he would want to return to Thor if all creatives were able to find another way to reinvent the character again to keep the experience "a little unpredictable" in order to not become stale with audiences. Waititi noted in Titan Books' Thor: Love and Thunder – The Official Movie Special Book, which was published in August 2023, that any additional Thor film would need to continue the character's evolution "but still in a very fun way and still giving him things to come up against" and would need to have a villain more powerful than Hela, who is featured in Ragnarok. In November 2023, Waititi confirmed that he would not be involved with a fifth Thor film.
