= Kaffir Folk-lore =

Xhosa mythology collection

Kaffir Folk-lore: A Selection from the Traditional Tales is a book by George McCall Theal published in 1882. It is sometimes called Kaffir (Xhosa) Folk-lore or even Xhosa Folk-lore to avoid the word kaffir, which has since become a derogatory term (in the time the book was written, however, it was frequently used to refer to the Xhosa people).

The book contains twenty-three Xhosa folk-tales and a list of common proverbs, all of which were collected from, recorded by, and verified by native Xhosa whom Theal questioned. It also includes several pages of footnotes written by Theal himself, mainly translating Xhosa words and explaining parts of Xhosa culture.
