= John Steptoe =

American writer and illustrator (1950–1989)

- Born: September 14, 1950; Brooklyn, New York, U.S.
- Died: August 28, 1989 (aged 38); St. Luke's Hospital in Manhattan, New York, U.S.
- Occupation: Author
- Known for: Mufaro's Beautiful Daughters
- Children: Javaka Steptoe

John Steptoe (September 14, 1950 – August 28, 1989) was an author and illustrator children's books dealing with aspects of the African-American experience. He is best known for writing Mufaro's Beautiful Daughters (1987), which is noted for its presentation of African culture.

== Early life ==
John Steptoe was born on September 14, 1950, in Brooklyn, New York, and grew up in Bedford–Stuyvesant with his sister and two brothers. Their father laid tracks for the precursor of the Metropolitan Transportation Authority.

Steptoe began drawing as a young boy and attended the High School of Art and Design in Manhattan, where he was taught by Norman Lewis. However, Steptoe dropped out three months before graduation because he did not find school practical. Steptoe stated: "It wasn’t my thing. I was getting sick on the train fighting all those people when it wasn’t that important for me to get where I was going."

Steptoe later attended the Vermont Academy, where he studied under the sculptor John Torres, and William Majors, a widely acclaimed painter.

== Career ==
Steptoe began his first picture book, Stevie and Me, at age 16. In 1967, while a high school student, he showed up to the Harper & Row office unannounced with his portfolio. Steptoe's art impressed a staff member, and he returned several days later for a meeting with Ursula Nordstrom, the director of the children's books. Following their conversation, Steptoe received a letter offering a contract and an advance as soon as he had a rough draft. Nordstrom wrote, "We think you are tremendously talented and we are delighted to think that your first book will be for us."

In 1969, 18-year-old Steptoe published the children's book Stevie, which was met with outstanding critical praise. Life magazine printed the book in its entirety and heralded it as "a new kind of book for black children." Steptoe explained that "the story, the language, is not directed at white children" and that instead he wanted a book that black kids "could read without translating the language, something real which would relate to what a black child would know."

Steptoe went on to illustrate 15 more picture books, including 10 he also wrote. The American Library Association gave a Caldecott The Jumping Mouse in 1985 and Mufaro’s Beautiful Daughters in 1988 a Caldecott Honor. Steptoe won the Coretta Scott King Award for illustration in 1982 for Mother Crocodile written by Rosa Guy, as well as in 1987 for Mufaro’s Beautiful Daughters.

All of Steptoe's work involve the African American experience. Mufaro’s Beautiful Daughters is based on a 19th century African folk tale, and writing it caused Steptoe to study African culture in more depth than ever before, igniting a pride in his heritage. Steptoe hoped that his books would lead African American children to feel similar pride in their origins. When accepting the Boston Globe–Horn Book Award for Illustration, Steptoe said: "I am not an exception to the rule among my race of people ... There are a great many others like me where I come from."

Caldecott Honors for Illustration

- 1985 Story of Jumping Mouse-A Native American Legend
- 1988 Mufaro’s Beautiful Daughters

Coretta Scott King Award for Illustration

- 1982 Mother Crocodile
- 1988 Mufaro’s Beautiful Daughters

== Personal life and death ==
Steptoe had two children whom he raised largely as a single father. Bweela, who is one of the models for many of Steptoe's books including Mufaro's Beautiful Daughters, and son Javaka Steptoe, who is an author–illustrator of children's literature as well, and won the 2017 Caldecott Medal for Radiant Child: The Story of Young Artist Jean-Michel Basquiat.

Steptoe died of AIDS on August 28, 1989, at St. Luke's Hospital in Manhattan. He was only 38 years old. At the time of his death, Steptoe was among the few African American artists who made a career in children's literature. Following his death, the American Library Association established the John Steptoe Award for New Talent, which is given to affirm new talent and excellence in writing and/or illustration.
