= Radiant Child: The Story of Young Artist Jean-Michel Basquiat =

2016 picture book by Javaka Steptoe

- Author: Javaka Steptoe
- Publisher: Little, Brown and Company
- Publication date: October 25, 2016
- Pages: 40
- Awards: Caldecott Medal; Coretta Scott King Illustrator Award
- ISBN: 978-0-316-21388-2
- OCLC: 991475987
- Website: http://littlebrownlibrary.com/radiant-child/

Radiant Child: The Story of Young Artist Jean-Michel Basquiat is a 2016 picture book biography by Javaka Steptoe about Jean-Michel Basquiat. Using a style similar to Basquiat's, the book tells the story of his childhood and early career. It won the 2017 Caldecott Medal and Coretta Scott King Illustrator Award for its illustrations.

== Conception ==
Javaka Steptoe first thought of doing a book on Basquiat following a visit to see an exhibit on the artist at the Brooklyn Museum, whose trash Steptoe would use while illustrating the book. He was drawn to Basquiat by the "energy" of Basquiat's work and a feeling that many in the art world scorn his work and put it down as graffiti. Steptoe also felt a connection through New York and between the art of Basquiat and that of his parents, both of whom were artists. He particularly credits the way his father, Caldecott Honor and Coretta Scott King award-winning artist John Steptoe, introduced him to the concept of considering diversity through the metaphor of windows, mirrors, and sliding glass doors. It took five or six years for Steptoe to write the book, which included incorporating new information about Basquiat when it became known.

== Narrative ==
The story tells of Basquiat's connection to art and his journey towards becoming an artist. The book begins with Basquiat's childhood in Brooklyn where he notices art all around him and enjoys its creation. It tells of his connection to his mother who leaves the home due to mental illness. As a teen Basquiat moves to the Lower East Side and begins as a street artist before moving into galleries. By the end of the book he has become a successful professional artist.

== Illustrations ==
The illustrations are meant to invoke Basquiat's artistic style with Steptoe's and were painted on found wood. This blending was made easier by the similarity of their styles and also allowed Steptoe to include several of Basquiat's motifs and what the book calls Basquiat's, "sloppy, ugly, and sometimes weird, but somehow still BEAUTIFUL" creations. The use of found materials "add rich texture and interesting imperfections to Steptoe’s illustrations."

== Reception & Awards ==
The book was well received by critics, including numerous starred reviews, and also received several awards. Booklist praised the, "lively, engaging introduction to a one-of-a-kind artist perfect for art-loving kids." Similarly in a starred review Robbin E. Friedman writing for School Library Journal recommended the book, "Pairing simple text with expressive, encompassing illustrations this excellent title offers a new generation a fittingly powerful introduction to an artistic luminary." The book also received starred reviews in Kirkus Reviews, the Horn Book Guide, Publishers Weekly, and School Library Connection. Elizabeth Bush, however, in The Bulletin of the Center for Children's Books criticized the lack of Basquiat's own art, even in the book's bibliography.

The American Library Association awarded the book the 2017 Caldecott Medal, given annually to the best American Picture book, and the Coretta Scott King Illustrator Award, given to recognize children's books by African American authors and illustrators that reflect the African American experience. Immediately following these awards the book sold an additional 1,100 copies. In its King Award citation the ALA, noted how the "collage style paintings with rich texture, bold colors and thick lines take readers on an emotional journey" and called the illustrations "striking."

=== Impact on Steptoe ===
The Caldecott win came as a surprise as he felt other books had seemed more likely winners. During his Coretta Scott King acceptance speech Steptoe reflected on the ways he had grown as an artist over his career and the inspirations and reasons he was able to be so successful in creating Radiant Child. Steptoe has remarked that these wins, in particular the Caldecott Medal, helped to ensure the black experience was seen and black voices would be heard and served as a platform for him to be heard. The author/illustrator has also seen the impact that his depiction of Basquiat's mother's mental illness has had on children.

== See also ==
- List of paintings by Jean-Michel Basquiat

Awards
Preceded by Finding Winnie	Caldecott Medal; 2017	Succeeded by Wolf in the Snow
Preceded by Trombone Shorty	Coretta Scott King Illustrator Award; 2017	Succeeded by Out of Wonder: Poems Celebrating Poets
