= Kokou (vodun) =

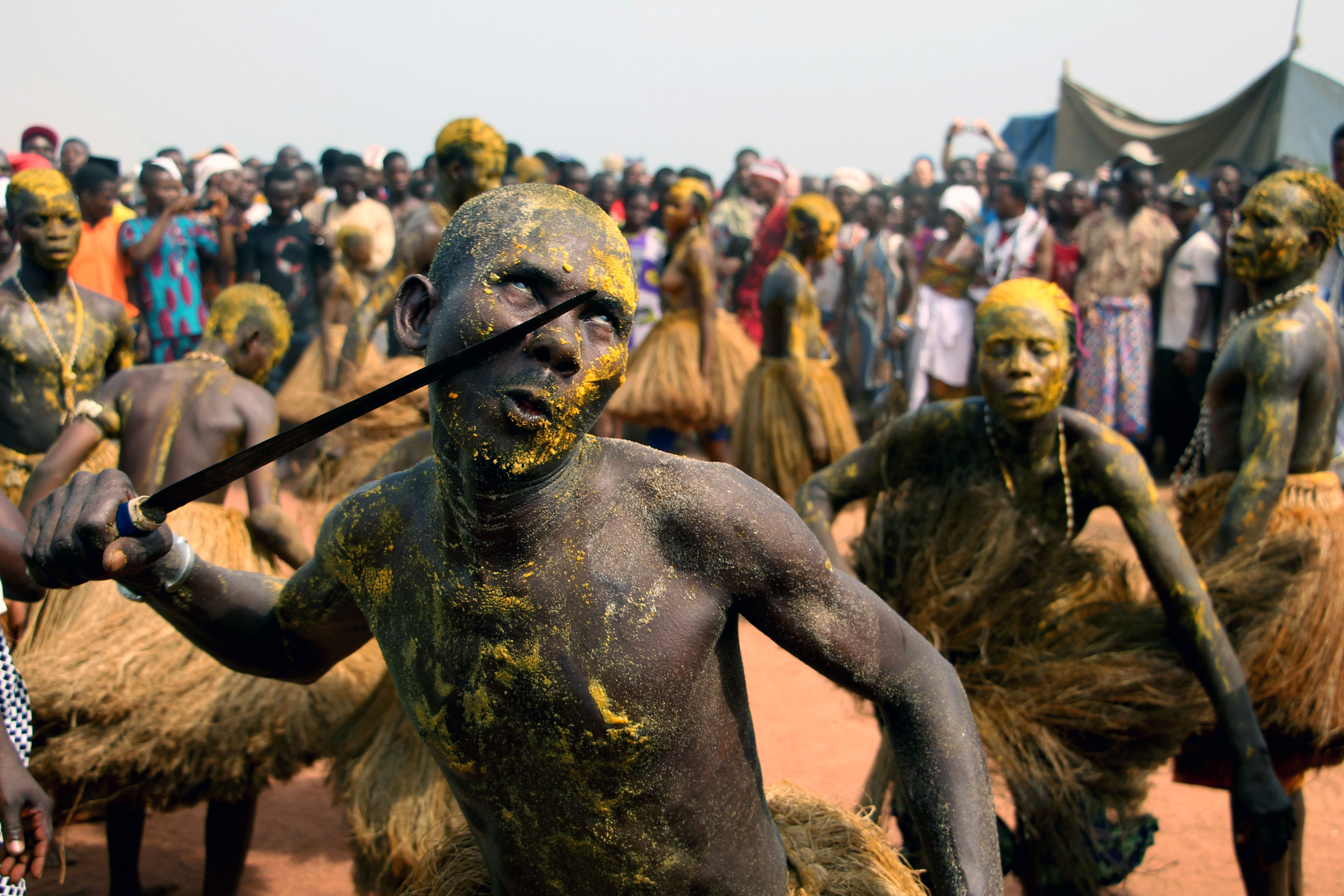
Kokoussi followers at the vodoun festival on January 10, 2020

A Kokou is one of the most highly feared warrior Voduns (deities) in the traditional religion of Benin.

One who fails to respect the Kokou during a ceremonial trance may have a sacred calabash placed on their head until it becomes excessively heavy.

== Bibliography ==
- Butler, Stuart (2006), Benin, Guilford, Connecticut: Bradt Travel Guides, The Globe Pequot Press
