= List of Marvel Cinematic Universe television series actors (Marvel Television) =

Television series actors list

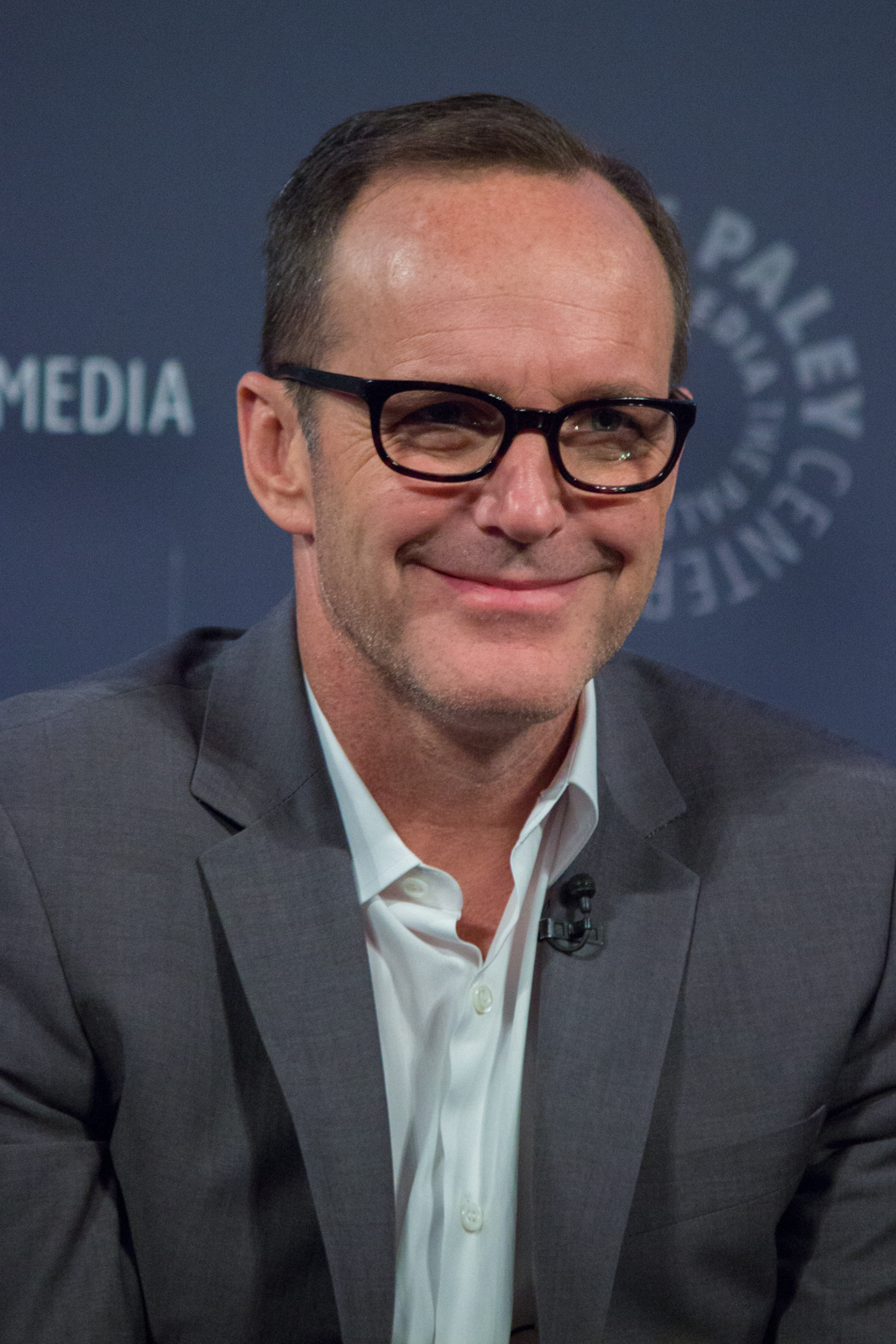
Clark Gregg

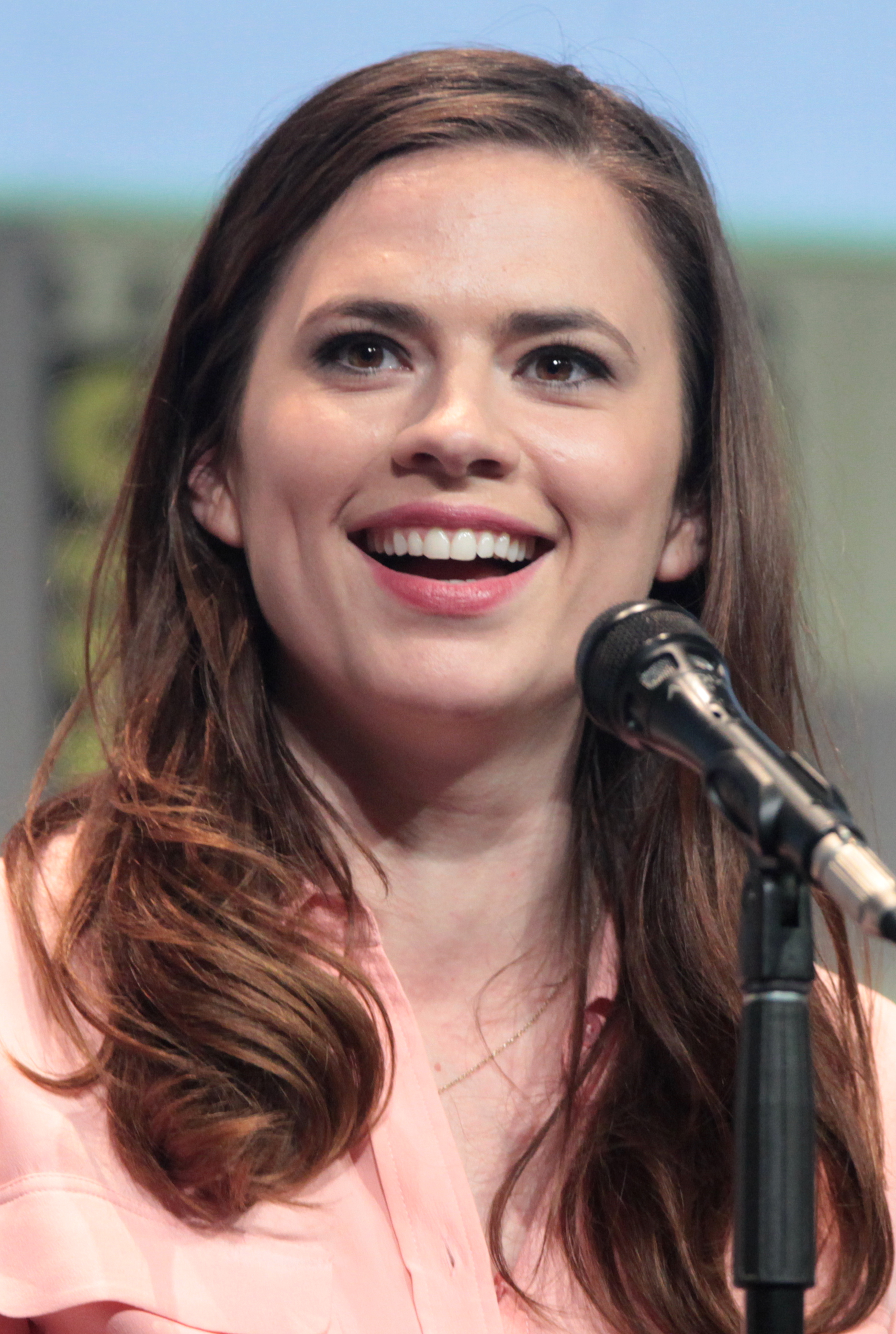
Hayley Atwell

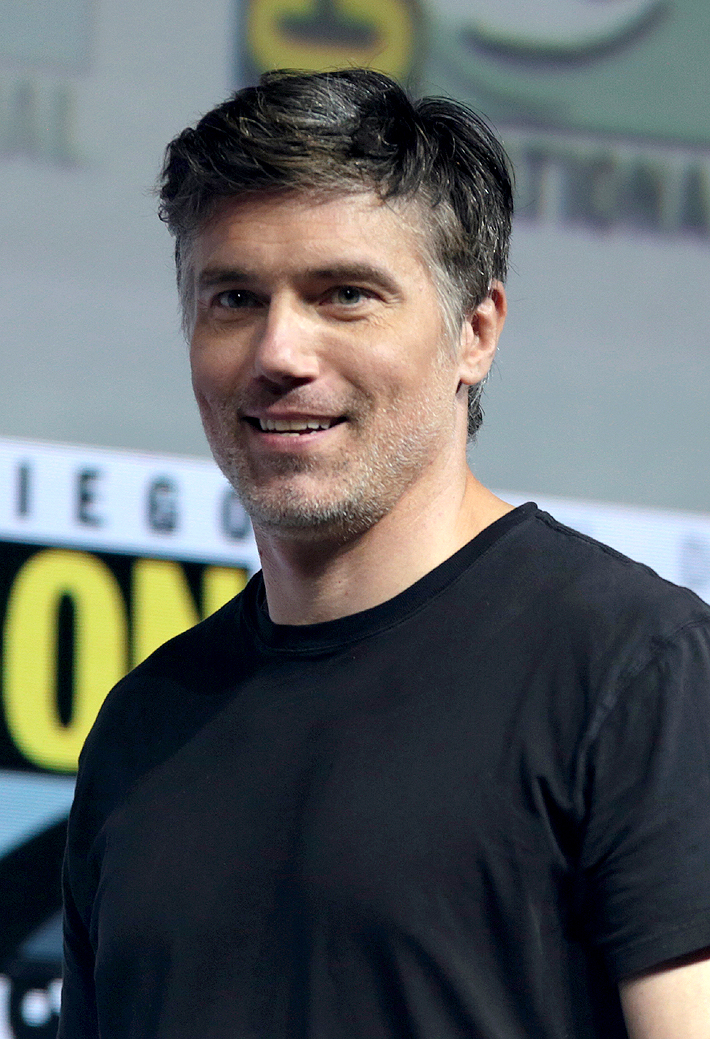
Anson Mount

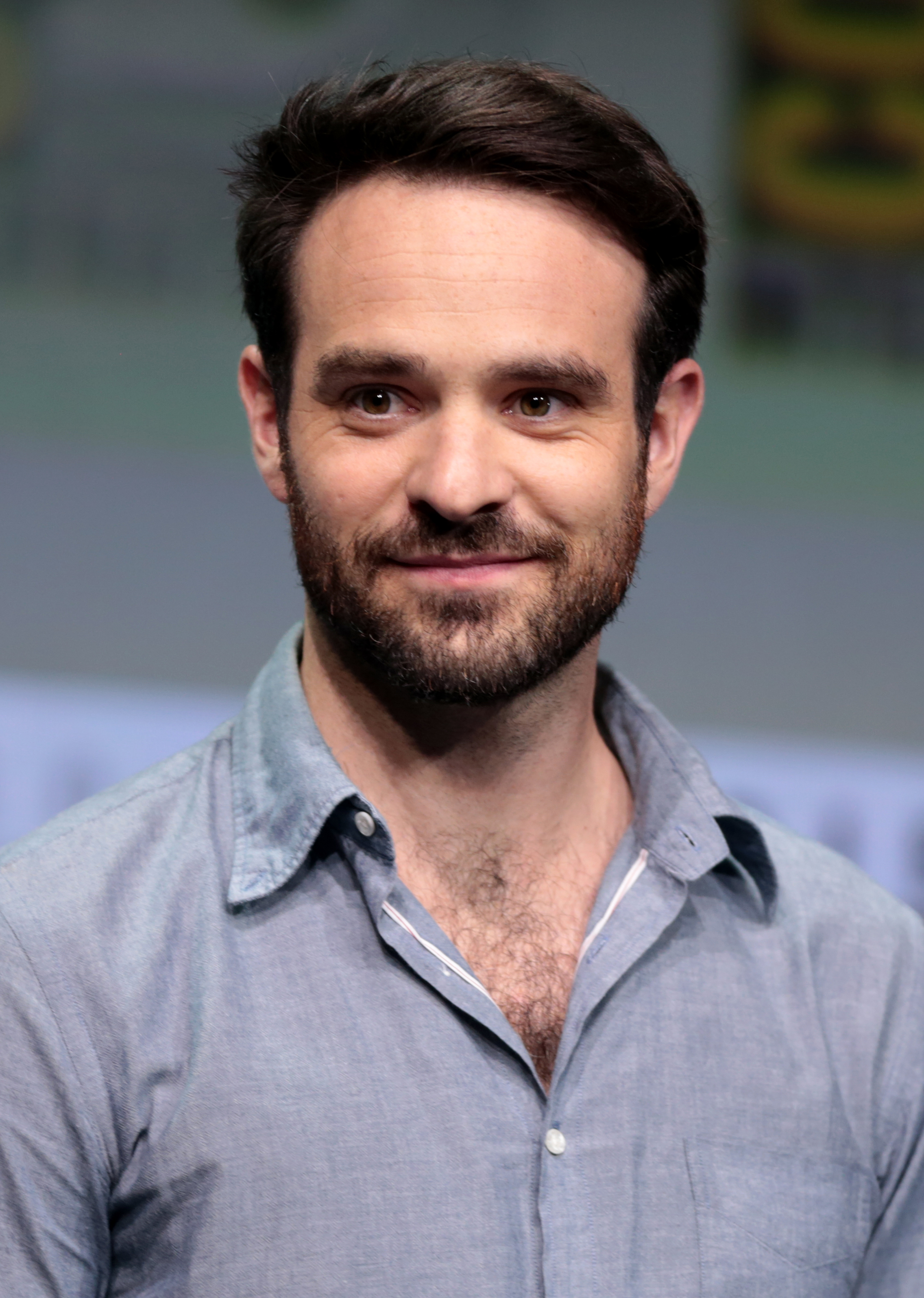
Charlie Cox

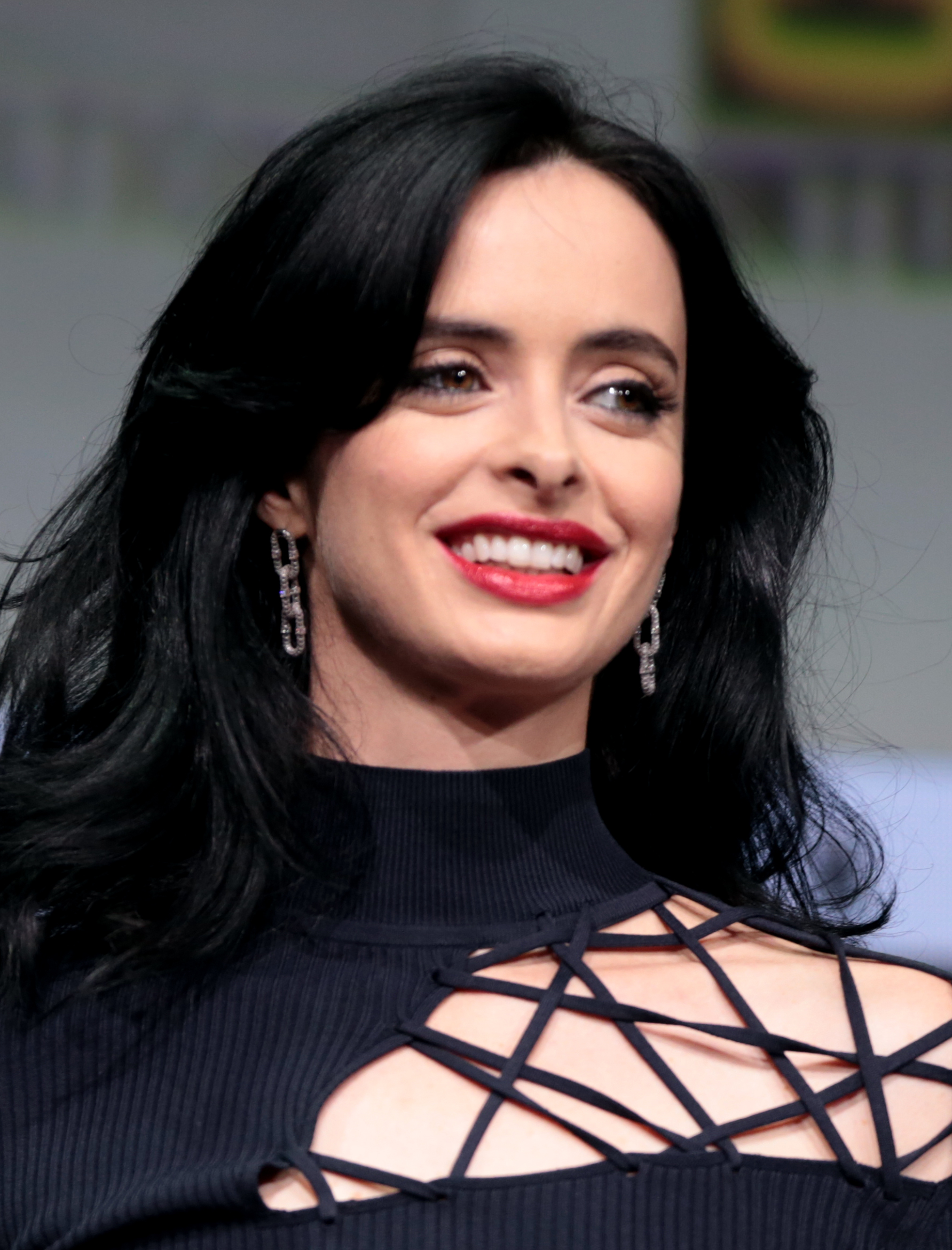
Krysten Ritter

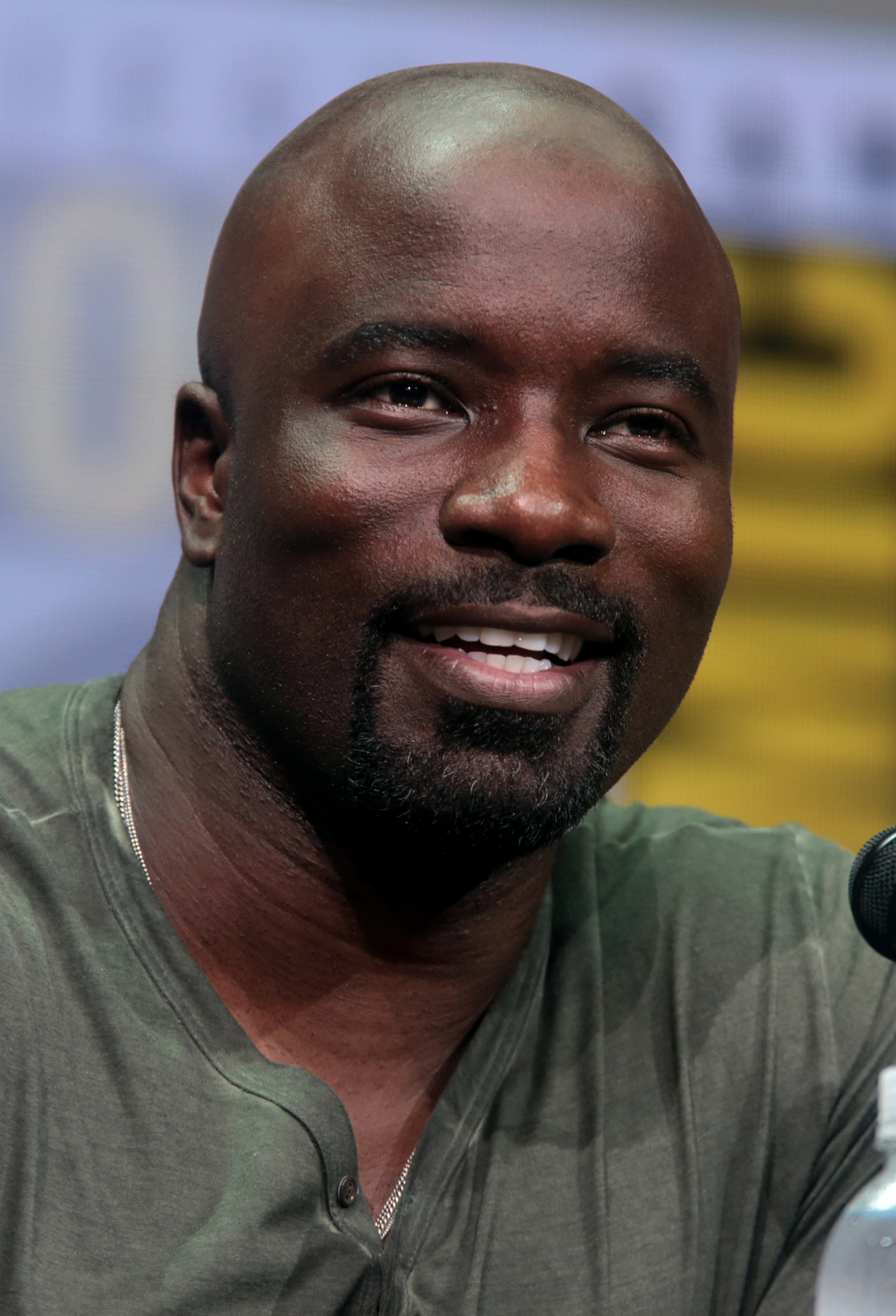
Mike Colter

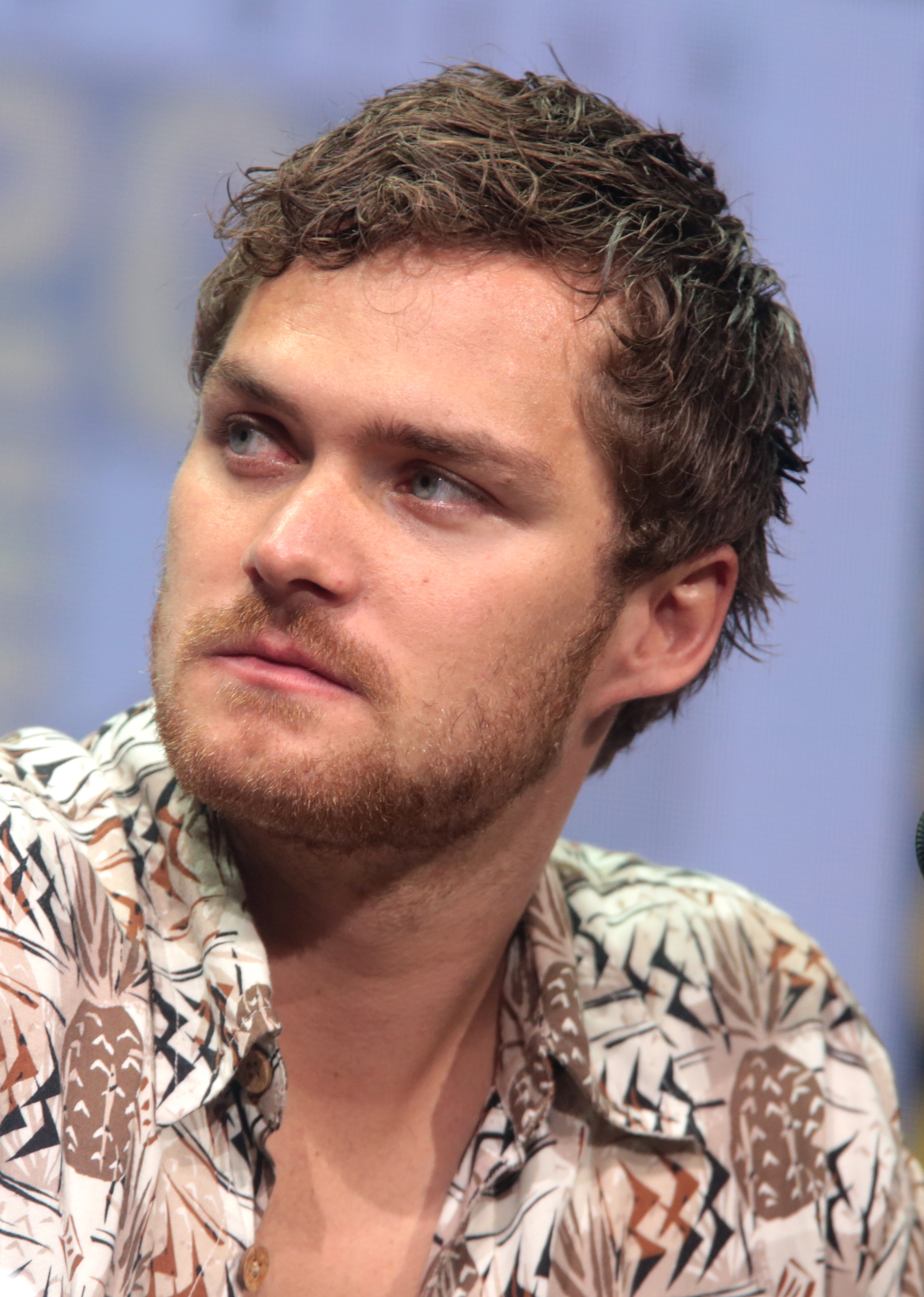
Finn Jones

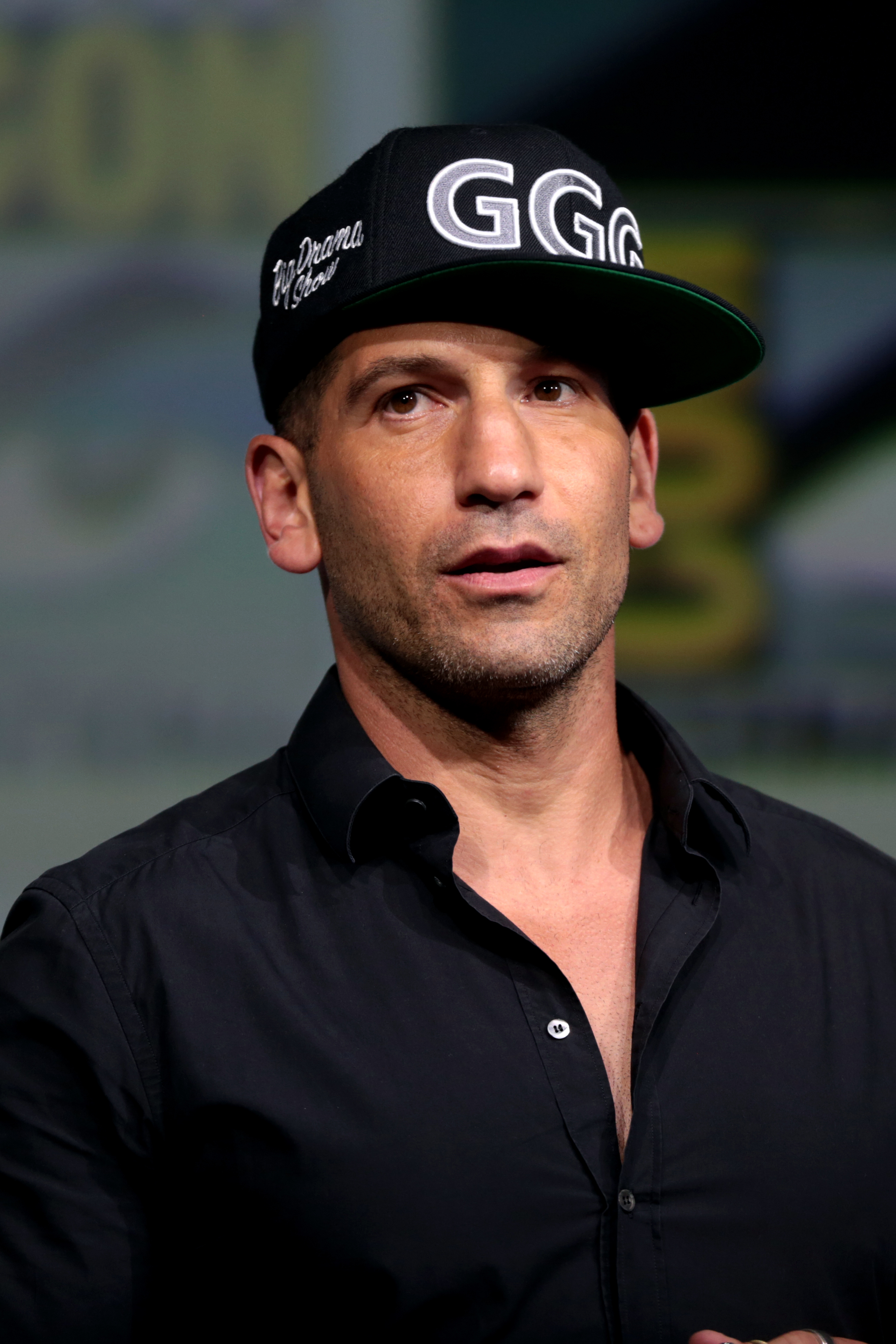
Jon Bernthal

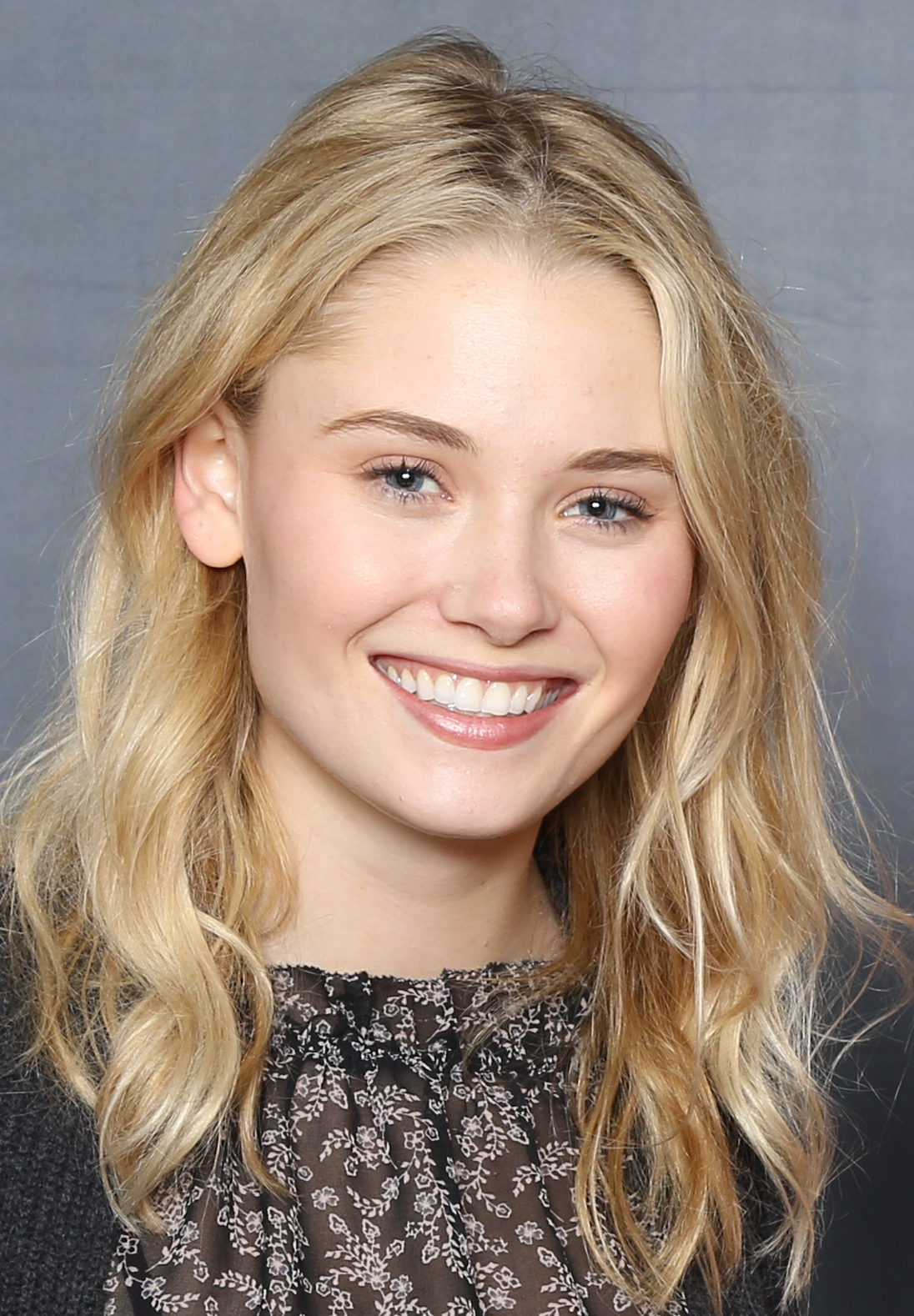
Virginia Gardner

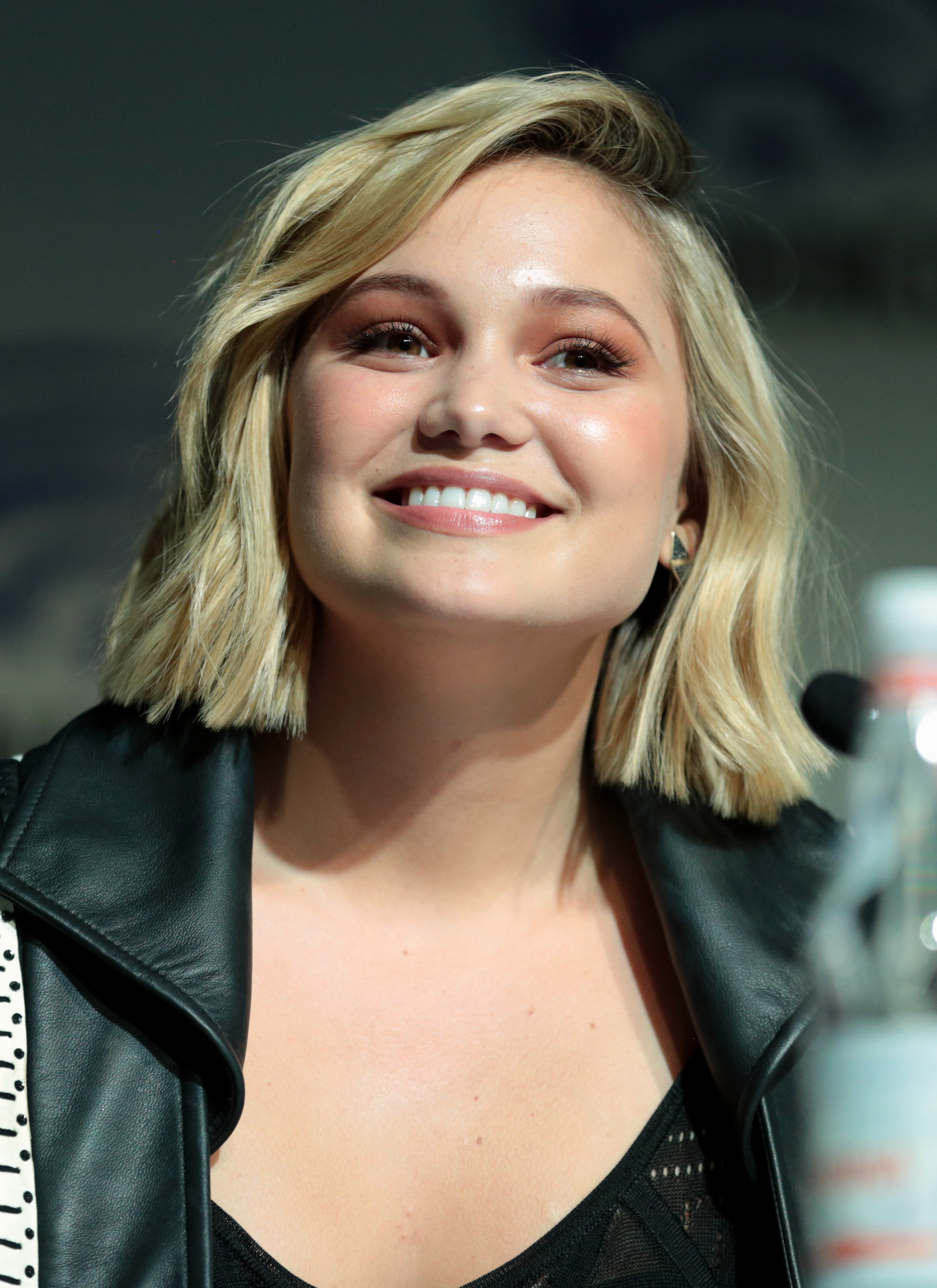
Olivia Holt

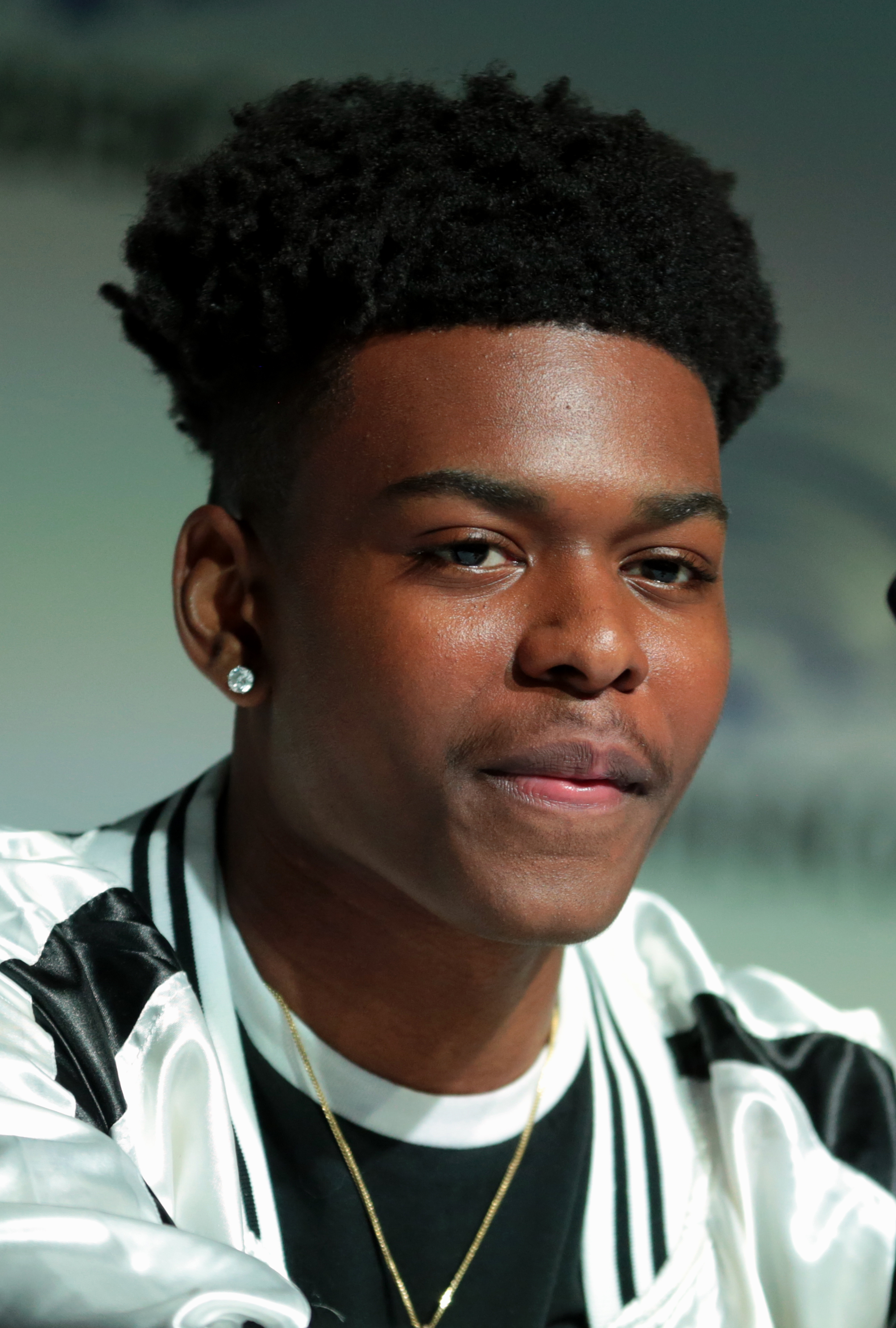
Aubrey Joseph

Gregg, Atwell, and Mount headline series on ABC, while Cox, Ritter, Colter, Jones, and Bernthal headline series on Netflix. Gardner co-stars in Runaways on Hulu. Holt and Joseph headline Cloak & Dagger on Freeform.

The Marvel Cinematic Universe (MCU) is a media franchise and shared fictional universe that is the setting of superhero television series based on characters that appear in Marvel Comics publications. Marvel Television released the first series in the universe, Agents of S.H.I.E.L.D., which began airing on ABC during the 2013–14 television season, and was joined by Agent Carter in the 2014–15 television season. Inhumans aired on ABC in the 2017–18 television season. Netflix's Marvel series began in 2015 with Daredevil and Jessica Jones, with Luke Cage releasing in 2016. Those series were followed by Iron Fist, the crossover miniseries The Defenders, and The Punisher in 2017. Additionally, the MCU expanded to Hulu with Runaways, also in 2017, and Helstrom in 2020, and expanded to Freeform with Cloak & Dagger in 2018. Marvel Studios—the production studio behind the MCU feature films—began releasing series in 2021 that feature greater interconnectivity with the films than these series.

Agents of S.H.I.E.L.D. is headlined by Clark Gregg in the role of Phil Coulson, while Hayley Atwell stars as Peggy Carter in Agent Carter, both reprising their roles from the MCU films. Anson Mount headlines Inhumans as Black Bolt. Charlie Cox is featured as Matt Murdock / Daredevil in Daredevil, while Krysten Ritter leads as Jessica Jones in Jessica Jones, which also introduces Mike Colter as Luke Cage, who later headlined Luke Cage. Finn Jones stars as Danny Rand / Iron Fist in Iron Fist and joins Cox, Ritter, and Colter in reprising their roles for The Defenders. Jon Bernthal stars as Frank Castle / Punisher in The Punisher, after being introduced in the second season of Daredevil. Runaways co-stars Rhenzy Feliz as Alex Wilder. Cloak & Dagger sees Olivia Holt and Aubrey Joseph as Tandy Bowen / Dagger and Tyrone Johnson / Cloak, respectively. Helstrom stars Tom Austen and Sydney Lemmon as Daimon and Ana Helstrom, respectively.

Due to the nature of the shared universe, several actors appear in the series as characters that had previously appeared in other mediums, including: Gregg, who appeared as Coulson in the films Iron Man, Iron Man 2, Thor, Marvel's The Avengers, and the short films The Consultant and A Funny Thing Happened on the Way to Thor's Hammer, before appearing in Agents of S.H.I.E.L.D.; and Atwell, who portrayed Carter in the films Captain America: The First Avenger and Captain America: The Winter Soldier and the short film Agent Carter, upon which the series of the same name is based, before appearing in Agents of S.H.I.E.L.D. as well. Atwell is the first actor to appear in multiple MCU television series with her role in Agent Carter. All characters that have made appearances in other MCU media, such as the digital series Agents of S.H.I.E.L.D.: Slingshot, are noted.

== ABC series ==
List indicators
This section includes characters who have appeared in one of the series as a member of the main cast or as a guest star in multiple series.
- A dark grey cell indicates the character was not in the series.
- A ^{DS} indicates the character appears in a digital series.
- An ^{F} indicates the character appears in a film.
- A ^{G} indicates a guest appearance in the series.
- An ^{OS} indicates the character appears in a One-Shot.
- An ^{R} indicates a recurring role in the series.

Character	Agents of S.H.I.E.L.D.	Agent Carter	Inhumans
Black Bolt			Anson Mount
Lincoln Campbell	Luke Mitchell		
Peggy Carter^{F} ^{OS}	Hayley Atwell^{G}	Hayley Atwell	
Phil Coulson^{DS} ^{F} ^{OS}	Clark Gregg		
Crystal			Isabelle Cornish
Roger Dooley		Shea Whigham	
Timothy "Dum Dum" Dugan^{F} ^{OS}	Neal McDonough^{G}	Neal McDonough^{G}	
Leo Fitz^{DS}	Iain De Caestecker		
Gorgon			Eme Ikwuakor
Lance Hunter	Nick Blood		
Edwin Jarvis^{F}		James D'Arcy	
Daisy "Skye" Johnson Quake^{DS}	Chloe Bennet		
Karnak			Ken Leung
Louise			Ellen Woglom
Alphonso "Mack" Mackenzie^{DS}	Henry Simmons		
Melinda May^{DS}	Ming-Na Wen		
Maximus			Iwan Rheon
Medusa			Serinda Swan
Bobbi Morse	Adrianne Palicki		
Holden Radcliffe	John Hannah		
Elena "Yo-Yo" Rodriguez^{DS}	Natalia Cordova-Buckley		
Jemma Simmons^{DS}	Elizabeth Henstridge		
Deke Shaw	Jeff Ward		
Daniel Sousa	Enver Gjokaj^{R}	Enver Gjokaj	
Jack Thompson		Chad Michael Murray	
Grant Ward	Brett Dalton		

== Netflix series ==
=== 2015–2017 ===
List indicators
This section includes main cast members, recurring characters, and notable guest stars, as defined by the FAQ.
- A dark grey cell indicates the character was not in the season.
- A ^{2} indicates the character reappears in a season or series that released from 2018–2019.
- An ^{F} indicates the character appears in a film.
- An ^{M} indicates the actor was part of the main cast for the season.
- An ^{MS} indicates the character appears in a Marvel Studios television series.
- An ^{SP} indicates the character appears in a Marvel Studios Special Presentation.

Character	2015		2016		2017		
Character	Daredevil season 1	Jessica Jones season 1	Daredevil season 2	Luke Cage season 1	Iron Fist season 1	The Defenders	The Punisher season 1
==== Introduced in Daredevil season 1 ====
Turk Barrett^{2}	Rob Morgan		Rob Morgan	Rob Morgan		Rob Morgan	Rob Morgan
Shirley Benson	Suzanne H. Smart		Suzanne H. Smart		Suzanne H. Smart		
Christian Blake	Chris Tardio						
Elena Cardenas	Judith Delgado						
Mitchell Ellison^{2} ^{MS}	Geoffrey Cantor		Geoffrey Cantor				Geoffrey Cantor
Wilson Fisk Kingpin^{2} ^{MS}	Vincent D'Onofrio^{M}		Vincent D'Onofrio^{M}				
Francis	Tom Walker						
Gao	Wai Ching Ho		Wai Ching Ho		Wai Ching Ho	Wai Ching Ho	
Carl Hoffman	Daryl Edwards						
Josie^{MS}	Susan Varon		Susan Varon			Susan Varon	
Paul Lantom^{2}	Peter McRobbie		Peter McRobbie			Peter McRobbie	
Brett Mahoney^{2} ^{MS}	Royce Johnson	Royce Johnson	Royce Johnson				Royce Johnson
Vanessa Marianna^{2} ^{MS}	Ayelet Zurer^{M}						
Matt Murdock Daredevil^{2} ^{F} ^{MS}	Charlie Cox^{M}		Charlie Cox^{M}			Charlie Cox^{M}	
Franklin "Foggy" Nelson^{2} ^{MS}	Elden Henson^{M}		Elden Henson^{M}			Elden Henson^{M}	
Leland Owlsley	Bob Gunton^{M}						
Karen Page^{2} ^{MS} ^{SP}	Deborah Ann Woll^{M}		Deborah Ann Woll^{M}			Deborah Ann Woll^{M}	Deborah Ann Woll^{M}
Melvin Potter^{2}	Matt Gerald		Matt Gerald				
Vladimir Ranskahov	Nikolai Nikolaeff						
Marci Stahl^{2}	Amy Rutberg		Amy Rutberg			Amy Rutberg	
Stick	Scott Glenn		Scott Glenn			Scott Glenn^{M}	
Roscoe Sweeney	Kevin Nagle		Kevin Nagle				
Claire Temple^{2} ^{F}	Rosario Dawson^{M}	Rosario Dawson	Rosario Dawson^{M}	Rosario Dawson^{M}	Rosario Dawson^{M}	Rosario Dawson^{M}	
Ben Urich	Vondie Curtis-Hall^{M}						
Doris Urich	Adriane Lenox						
James Wesley^{MS}	Toby Leonard Moore^{M}						
Nobu Yoshioka	Peter Shinkoda		Peter Shinkoda				
==== Introduced in Jessica Jones season 1 ====
Clair		Danielle Ferland					
Oscar Clemons		Clarke Peters					
Reva Connors		Parisa Fitz-Henley		Parisa Fitz-Henley			
Donald		Paul Pryce					
Malcolm Ducasse^{2}		Eka Darville^{M}				Eka Darville^{M}	
Emma		Gillian Glasco					
Jeri Hogarth^{2}		Carrie-Anne Moss^{M}	Carrie-Anne Moss		Carrie-Anne Moss	Carrie-Anne Moss	
Jackson		Ryan Ferrell					
Alisa Jones^{2}		Miriam Shor					
Jessica Jones^{2} ^{MS}		Krysten Ritter^{M}				Krysten Ritter^{M}	
Carl Lucas / Luke Cage^{2} ^{MS}		Mike Colter^{M}		Mike Colter^{M}		Mike Colter^{M}	
Nicole^{2}		Nichole Yannetty				Nichole Yannetty	
Pam		Susie Abromeit					
Samantha Reyes		Michelle Hurd	Michelle Hurd				
Robyn		Colby Minifie					
Wendy Ross-Hogarth		Robin Weigert					
Ruben		Kieran Mulcare					
Hope Shlottman		Erin Moriarty^{M}					
Will Simpson^{2}		Wil Traval^{M}					
Albert Thompson		Michael Siberry					
Kevin Thompson Kilgrave^{2}		David Tennant^{M}					
Louise Thompson		Lisa Emery					
Patricia "Trish" Walker^{2}		Rachael Taylor^{M}		Rachael Taylor^{V}		Rachael Taylor^{M}	
==== Introduced in Daredevil season 2 ====
Frank Castle Punisher^{2} ^{F} ^{MS} ^{SP}			Jon Bernthal^{M}				Jon Bernthal^{M}
Louisa Delgado			Marilyn Torres				
Benjamin Donovan^{2}			Danny Johnson	Danny Johnson			
Stan Gibson			John Pirkis				
Hirochi			Ron Nakahara				
Ray Schoonover			Clancy Brown				Clancy Brown
Elektra Natchios^{MS}			Élodie Yung^{M}			Élodie Yung^{M}	
Blake Tower^{2}			Stephen Rider^{M}	Stephen Rider			
==== Introduced in Luke Cage season 1 ====
Hernan "Shades" Alvarez^{2}				Theo Rossi^{M}			
Mark Bailey^{2}				Justin Swain			
Noah Burstein				Michael Kostroff			
Domingo Colon				Jacob Vargas			
Darryl				Marquis Rodriguez	Marquis Rodriguez		
Mariah Dillard^{2}				Alfre Woodard^{M}			
Bobby Fish^{2}				Ron Cephas Jones			
D. W. Griffith^{2}				Jeremiah Richard Craft			
Mercedes "Misty" Knight^{2}				Simone Missick^{M}		Simone Missick^{M}	
Connie Lin^{2}				Jade Wu			
Megan McLaren				Dawn-Lyen Gardner			
Candace Miller				Deborah Ayorinde			
Priscilla Ridley^{2}				Karen Pittman			
Rafael Scarfe^{2}				Frank Whaley			
Cornell "Cottonmouth" Stokes				Mahershala Ali^{M}			
Willis Stryker Diamondback				Erik LaRay Harvey^{M}			
Sugar^{2}				Sean Ringgold			
Soledad Temple				Sônia Braga			
Thembi Wallace^{2}				Tijuana Ricks	Tijuana Ricks		
Alex Wesley^{2}				John Clarence Stewart			
Lonnie Wilson^{2}				Darius Kaleb			
Zip				Jaiden Kaine			
==== Introduced in Iron Fist season 1 ====
Bakuto					Ramón Rodríguez^{M}	Ramón Rodríguez^{M}	
Davos^{2}					Sacha Dhawan^{M}		
Kyle					Alex Wyse		
Harold Meachum					David Wenham^{M}		
Joy Meachum^{2}					Jessica Stroup^{M}		
Ward Meachum^{2}					Tom Pelphrey^{M}		
Megan					Barrett Doss		
Danny Rand Iron Fist^{2} ^{MS}					Finn Jones^{M}	Finn Jones^{M}	
Wendell Rand					David Furr		
Maria Rodriguez					Elise Santora		
Kevin Singleton					Ramon Fernandez		
Lawrence Wilkins					Clifton Davis		
Colleen Wing^{2}					Jessica Henwick^{M}	Jessica Henwick^{M}	
==== Introduced in The Defenders ====
Cole Miller						J. Mallory McCree	
Murakami						Yutaka Takeuchi	
Lexi Raymond						Chloe Levine	
Michelle Raymond						Michelle Federer	
Alexandra						Sigourney Weaver^{M}	
Sowande						Babs Olusanmokun	
Strieber^{2}						Ron Simons	
==== Introduced in The Punisher season 1 ====
Frank Castle Jr.^{SP}							Aidan Pierce Brennan
Lisa Castle^{SP}							Nicolette Pierini
Maria Castle^{SP}							Kelli Barrett
Rafael Hernandez^{2}							Tony Plana
Curtis Hoyle^{2} ^{SP}							Jason R. Moore^{M}
Isaac Lange							Jordan Mahome
David Lieberman Micro							Ebon Moss-Bachrach^{M}
Leo Lieberman							Ripley Sobo
Sarah Lieberman							Jaime Ray Newman^{M}
Zach Lieberman							Kobi Frumer
Dinah Madani^{2}							Amber Rose Revah^{M}
Farah Madani							Shohreh Aghdashloo
William Rawlins Agent Orange							Paul Schulze^{M}
Billy Russo^{2}							Ben Barnes^{M}
Sam Stein							Michael Nathanson^{M}
Lewis Wilson							Daniel Webber^{M}

=== 2018–2019 ===
List indicators

This section includes main cast members, recurring characters, and notable guest stars, as defined by the FAQ.

- A dark grey cell indicates the character was not in the season.
- An ^{F} indicates the character appears in a film.
- An ^{M} indicates the actor was part of the main cast for the season.
- An ^{MS} indicates the character appears in a Marvel Studios television series.
- An ^{SP} indicates the character appears in a Marvel Studios Special Presentation.

Character	2018				2019	
Character	Jessica Jones season 2	Luke Cage season 2	Iron Fist season 2	Daredevil season 3	The Punisher season 2	Jessica Jones season 3
==== Introduced in earlier seasons or series ====
Hernan "Shades" Alvarez		Theo Rossi^{M}				
Turk Barrett	Rob Morgan	Rob Morgan	Rob Morgan		Rob Morgan	
Mark Bailey		Justin Swain				
Frank Castle Punisher^{F} ^{MS} ^{SP}					Jon Bernthal^{M}	
Davos			Sacha Dhawan^{M}			
Mariah Dillard		Alfre Woodard^{M}				
Benjamin "Big Ben" Donovan		Danny Johnson		Danny Johnson		
Malcolm Ducasse	Eka Darville^{M}					Eka Darville^{M}
Mitchell Ellison^{MS}				Geoffrey Cantor		
Bobby Fish		Ron Cephas Jones				
Wilson Fisk Kingpin^{MS}				Vincent D'Onofrio^{M}		
D. W. Griffith		Jeremiah Richard Craft				
Rafael Hernandez					Tony Plana	
Jeri Hogarth	Carrie-Anne Moss^{M}					Carrie-Anne Moss^{M}
Curtis Hoyle^{SP}					Jason R. Moore^{M}	
Alisa Jones	Janet McTeer^{M}					
Jessica Jones^{MS}	Krysten Ritter^{M}					Krysten Ritter^{M}
Mercedes "Misty" Knight		Simone Missick^{M}	Simone Missick^{M}			
Paul Lantom				Peter McRobbie		
Connie Lin		Jade Wu				
Carl Lucas / Luke Cage ^{MS}		Mike Colter^{M}				Mike Colter
Dinah Madani					Amber Rose Revah^{M}	
Brett Mahoney^{MS}				Royce Johnson	Royce Johnson	
Vanessa Marianna^{MS}				Ayelet Zurer		
Joy Meachum			Jessica Stroup^{M}			
Ward Meachum			Tom Pelphrey^{M}			
Matt Murdock Daredevil^{F} ^{MS}				Charlie Cox^{M}		
Franklin "Foggy" Nelson^{MS}	Elden Henson	Elden Henson		Elden Henson^{M}		
Nicole	Nichole Yannetty					
Karen Page^{MS} ^{SP}				Deborah Ann Woll^{M}	Deborah Ann Woll	
Melvin Potter				Matt Gerald		
Danny Rand Iron Fist ^{MS}		Finn Jones^{M}	Finn Jones^{M}			
Priscilla Ridley		Karen Pittman				
Billy Russo Jigsaw					Ben Barnes^{M}	
Rafael Scarfe		Frank Whaley				
Will Simpson	Wil Traval					
Marci Stahl				Amy Rutberg		
Strieber				Ron Simons		
Sugar		Sean Ringgold				
Claire Temple^{F}		Rosario Dawson				
Kevin Thompson Kilgrave	David Tennant					David Tennant^{V}
Blake Tower		Stephen Rider^{M}		Stephen Rider^{M}		
Dorothy Walker	Rebecca De Mornay					Rebecca De Monray
Patricia "Trish" Walker Hellcat	Rachael Taylor^{M}					Rachael Taylor^{M}
Thembi Wallace	Tijuana Ricks	Tijuana Ricks				Tijuana Ricks
Alex Wesley		John Clarence Stewart				
Lonnie Wilson		Darius Kaleb				
Colleen Wing		Jessica Henwick^{M}	Jessica Henwick^{M}			
==== Introduced in Jessica Jones season 2 ====
Oscar Arocho	J. R. Ramirez^{M}					J. R. Ramirez
Vido Arocho	Kevin Chacon					Kevin Chacon
Pryce Cheng	Terry Chen^{M}					
Inez Green	Leah Gibson^{M}					
Maynard Tiboldt	Ben Van Bergen					
==== Introduced in Luke Cage season 2 ====
Rosalie Carbone		Annabella Sciorra		Annabella Sciorra		
Tilda Johnson		Gabrielle Dennis^{M}				
John McIver Bushmaster		Mustafa Shakir^{M}				
==== Introduced in Iron Fist season 2 ====
Mary Walker			Alice Eve^{M}			
==== Introduced in Daredevil season 3 ====
Maggie Grace				Joanne Whalley^{M}		
Rahul "Ray" Nadeem				Jay Ali^{M}		
Benjamin "Dex" Poindexter^{MS}				Wilson Bethel^{M}		
==== Introduced in The Punisher season 2 ====
Amy Bendix					Giorgia Whigham^{M}	
Krista Dumont					Floriana Lima^{M}	
John Pilgrim					Josh Stewart^{M}	
Anderson Schultz					Corbin Bernsen	
Eliza Schultz					Annette O'Toole	
==== Introduced in Jessica Jones season 3 ====
Erik Gelden						Benjamin Walker^{M}
Kith Lyonne						Sarita Choudhury^{M}
Zaya Okonjo						Tiffany Mack^{M}
Gregory Sallinger						Jeremy Bobb^{M}

== Young adult series ==
List indicators

This section includes characters who have appeared in the series as a member of the main cast.

- A dark grey cell indicates the character was not in the series.
- A ^{G} indicates a guest appearance in the series.

Character	Runaways	Cloak & Dagger
Melissa Bowen		Andrea Roth
Tandy Bowen Dagger	Olivia Holt^{G}	Olivia Holt
James Connors		J. D. Evermore
Frank Dean	Kip Pardue	
Karolina Dean	Virginia Gardner	
Leslie Dean	Annie Wersching	
Francis Delgado		Jaime Zevallos
Molly Hayes Hernandez	Allegra Acosta	
Adina Johnson		Gloria Reuben
Otis Johnson		Miles Mussenden
Tyrone Johnson Cloak	Aubrey Joseph^{G}	Aubrey Joseph
Jonah	Julian McMahon	
Nico Minoru	Lyrica Okano	
Robert Minoru	James Yaegashi	
Tina Minoru	Brittany Ishibashi	
Brigid O'Reilly Mayhem		Emma Lahana
Chase Stein	Gregg Sulkin	
Janet Stein	Ever Carradine	
Victor Stein	James Marsters	
Liam Walsh		Carl Lundstedt
Alex Wilder	Rhenzy Feliz	
Catherine Wilder	Angel Parker	
Geoffrey Wilder	Ryan Sands	
Dale Yorkes	Kevin Weisman	
Gertrude "Gert" Yorkes	Ariela Barer	
Stacey Yorkes	Brigid Brannagh	
Xavin	Clarissa Thibeaux	

== Adventure into Fear ==
Tom Austen and Sydney Lemmon headline Helstrom as Daimon and Ana Helstrom, respectively. Helstrom was intended to be the first series in the planned Adventure into Fear franchise, which was intended to feature Gabriel Luna reprising his Agents of S.H.I.E.L.D. role of Robbie Reyes / Ghost Rider in the canceled Ghost Rider series.

== See also ==
- MCU television actors (Marvel Studios)
- Marvel One-Shots actors
- MCU film actors
- The Infinity Saga film actors
- Agents of S.H.I.E.L.D.: Slingshot actors
