= Luke Cage season 2 =

Luke Cage
- Season 2
- Promotional poster
- Showrunner: Cheo Hodari Coker
- Starring: Mike Colter; Simone Missick; Theo Rossi; Gabrielle Dennis; Mustafa Shakir; Jessica Henwick; Finn Jones; Stephen Rider; Alfre Woodard
- No. of episodes: 13

Release
- Original network: Netflix
- Original release: June 22, 2018

Season chronology
- ← Previous; Season 1

The second and final season of the American streaming television series Luke Cage, which is based on the Marvel Comics character of the same name, sees Luke Cage become a hero and celebrity in Harlem after clearing his name, only to face a new threat. It is set in the Marvel Cinematic Universe (MCU), sharing continuity with the films and other television series of the franchise. The season was produced by Marvel Television in association with ABC Studios, with Cheo Hodari Coker serving as showrunner.

Mike Colter stars as Cage, alongside returning principal cast members Simone Missick, Theo Rossi, and Alfre Woodard. They are joined by Gabrielle Dennis and Mustafa Shakir, with Jessica Henwick, Finn Jones, and Stephen Rider reprising their roles from other Marvel Netflix series; Rosario Dawson also returns in a guest role. The season was ordered in December 2016, and filmed in New York City from June to November 2017. Coker again emphasized music in the season: Adrian Younge and Ali Shaheed Muhammad returned to compose the original score, using blues and reggae to represent the conflict between the Stokes family and Shakir's John "Bushmaster" McIver; the season again features performances from various artists; and each episode is named after a Pete Rock & CL Smooth song. Reg E. Cathey has a recurring role as Cage's father in one of his last performances, and the season is dedicated to his memory.

The season premiered on June 21, 2018, before all 13 episodes were released on Netflix on June 22. It was widely praised as better than the first season, particularly for its narrative and cast—Woodard's performance especially—though there was again some criticism for its pacing. Netflix canceled the series on October 19, 2018.

== Episodes ==
No. overall	No. in season	Title (Note: Each episode is named after a Pete Rock & CL Smooth song.)	Directed by	Written by	Original release date
14	1	"Soul Brother #1"	Lucy Liu	Cheo Hodari Coker	June 22, 2018
Luke Cage, the bulletproof defender of Harlem, has become a celebrity. His friend D. W. Griffith attempts to earn him some money through merchandise and an app that tracks Cage's whereabouts. He spends his nights trying to stop a group from distributing drugs under his name. Following the secret battle at Midland Circle, (Note: As depicted in The Defenders (2017).) Mercedes "Misty" Knight is recovering from the loss of her arm and does not intend to return to police work, until she discovers that up to 30 of the criminals she previously sent to prison have now been released due to her late corrupt partner Rafael Scarfe. One of these criminals is Dontrell "Cockroach" Hamilton, who is looking to buy Mariah Stokes-Dillard's criminal empire alongside drug smuggler Arturo "El Rey" Gomez III and Jamaican gang leader Nigel Garrison. Griffith helps Cage identify El Rey as the "Luke Cage" drug cartel leader and turns him over to Knight's captain Tom Ridenhour, while Garrison is murdered by John "Bushmaster" McIver, who survives several gun shots and has arrived from Jamaica planning to take Harlem from Dillard. Joi, D-Nice, and Donald Harrison perform.
15	2	"Straighten It Out"	Steph Green	Akela Cooper	June 22, 2018
Bushmaster visits holistic doctor Tilda Johnson to get ingredients for augmenting the plant nightshade, which he uses to heal his wounds and increase his strength. Johnson is Dillard's daughter, and is also visited by her mother, who wants to publicly reunite with Johnson, after years apart, to improve her image and transition into a legitimate businesswoman. She arranges for El Rey to be released on bail and sends her lover Hernan "Shades" Alvarez to complete the sale with him. When El Rey refuses, and disrespects Dillard, Shades kills him. Knight is now on "light duty" and unable to pursue leads, but directs Cage to Cockroach. Cage believes he is indestructible, but Cockroach is able to dislocate Cage's shoulder with the force of a close-range, high-power gun. This bothers Cage's girlfriend, former nurse Claire Temple, who is struggling with her inability to help Cage as well as his reluctance to mend his relationship with his estranged father James Lucas. Johnson agrees to give her mother another chance. Cage later finds Cockroach beating his family in their apartment, and severely beats him. Gary Clark Jr. and DJ Mister Cee perform.
16	3	"Wig Out"	Marc Jobst	Matt Owens	June 22, 2018
Knight lets Cage leave Cockroach's apartment before her rival detective Nandi Tyler, as well as Tyler's partner Mark Bailey, arrive. Knight is later reprimanded for this, but Ridenhour explains that he cannot suspend Knight due to her high status within the department as a disabled hero. Knight later practices fighting with one arm, and lets out some frustration, with Colleen Wing, whom Knight had been defending when she lost her arm. With El Rey dead and Cockroach in the hospital, Shades turns to Garrison; he finds Bushmaster instead, who is more than willing to pay Dillard the money. Cage later arrives looking for Garrison, and fights several gang members who are armed with different weapons. Bushmaster secretly films this and trains in front of the footage. After meeting with Lucas, Temple confronts Cage about his anger, and he lashes out. She asks him to leave, and he is ambushed by Bushmaster. Esperanza Spalding performs.
17	4	"I Get Physical"	Salli Richardson-Whitfield	Matthew Lopes	June 22, 2018
Bushmaster knocks Cage unconscious, and footage of their fight spreads across the internet. Seeing this and recognizing Bushmaster, Johnson begins investigating the ingredients she sold him. When he wakes up, Cage decides to further investigate the Jamaicans and returns to the site of his fight with the gang members along with Knight. They discover Garrison's body, and Knight is able to talk to the owner of the building who grew up with Bushmaster and explains that he intends to right the perceived wrongs committed against his parents. From evidence at the building, Cage visits Johnson and she gives him medicine to help with his concussion. Bushmaster visits Dillard, and reveals that his ancestors were once in business with hers. Shades follows him back to a restaurant run by his acquaintances, while Shades' friend Darius "Comanche" Jones—who has been clashing with Dillard—secretly reports to Ridenhour. Cage's friend Bobby Fish leaves to serve as an organ donor for his sick daughter, and Cage is served by a process server. Christone "Kingfish" Ingram performs.
18	5	"All Souled Out"	Kasi Lemmons	Ian Stokes	June 22, 2018
Cockroach sues Cage for attacking him, and Cage agrees to pay him $100,000 rather than risk going to court. Broker Raymond "Piranha" Jones invests the money from Dillard's sale to Bushmaster in the plastics company of Mark Higgins, who Dillard blackmails into agreeing to a corporate merger that increases the profits of her new shares considerably. Higgins subsequently disappears, while Dillard uses her new "legitimate" fortune to open a Family First center in Harlem. She reveals all of this to Johnson, hoping that they can run the center together. Piranha throws a party to celebrate their successful venture, and hires Cage—who is looking for a way to pay Cockroach—to appear at the party. Cage ultimately saves Piranha when some of Bushmaster's men attempt to kidnap him. Knight is given a robotic arm by Wing and her billionaire boyfriend Danny Rand. She considers framing Cockroach before finding his body. At the opening of her center, Dillard discovers the severed heads of Cockroach, Higgins, and Shades' employee Andre "Ray-Ray" Jackson. Ghostface Killah and Adrian Younge perform.
19	6	"The Basement"	Millicent Shelton	Aïda Mashaka Croal	June 22, 2018
Dillard refuses to cooperate with the police, despite a shared history with Ridenhour. Knight confesses to Ridenhour about wanting to frame Cockroach, but when he chooses not to discipline her she quits out of guilt. Cage and Piranha go into hiding as Bushmaster's men scour the neighborhood for them. Cage insists that he will take Piranha to the police, despite Piranha wanting to pay Cage as a "hero for hire". After a discussion about their respective fathers, Cage decides to take Piranha to Lucas's church for protection. Shades and Comanche unsuccessfully search for Piranha, and reminisce about their relationship in prison. Comanche believes that Shades should get rid of Dillard and become the crime lord of Harlem himself. Shades later tells Dillard about following Bushmaster to the restaurant, and she plans what they will do to his acquaintances once they find Piranha, who has control of their money. Cage contacts Bushmaster, and the two meet to fight, ending with Cage paralyzed by a powdered substance and kicked into a river.
20	7	"On and On"	Rashaad Ernesto Green	Nicole Mirante Matthews	June 22, 2018
The paralysis wears off in time for Cage to swim to the surface, and he returns to the church to find Piranha missing. Ridenhour attempts to convince Knight to return to work, and tells her about having an informant working for Dillard. She instead works with Cage to find Piranha. Dillard realizes that Ridenhour has an informant herself, and questions the loyalty of her men. Meanwhile, Bushmaster captures Piranha, uses him to take all of Dillard's money and assets, and then kills him. Cage and Knight find the body. Ridenhour meets with Comanche, who is panicking about potentially being caught, but Shades follows Comanche to this meeting. Comanche kills Ridenhour, and then Shades shoots Comanche, making it look like Ridenhour did it. Dillard rushes to go into hiding with Johnson, but is caught by Bushmaster who leaves them in a burning house as revenge for the Stokes family burning his mother alive. Bushmaster then claims the Stokes family's nightclub, Harlem's Paradise, as his, while Cage saves Dillard and Johnson. Stephen Marley performs.
21	8	"If It Ain't Rough, It Ain't Right"	Neema Barnette	Nathan Louis Jackson	June 22, 2018
When Bushmaster learns that Cage saved Dillard, he plans to increase his strength with more nightshade. Cage takes Dillard and Johnson to the police precinct, where Knight—who had not officially completed her resignation—is now in charge. Shades arrives, and Knight deduces that he likely killed Comanche or Ridenhour, but she does not have any evidence that he did. Dillard and Johnson are shot at by Bushmaster's men outside the precinct, but Cage helps them escape. Knight uses this to get a search warrant for Harlem's Paradise, but they find nothing incriminating. Concerned for the safety of his loved ones, Cage attends a service at the church and is there to protect his father when Bushmaster's men arrive. At the same time, Dillard and Johnson are attacked while Dillard is explaining how she had been forced to give her daughter up to her cousins, the Johnson family, by Stokes matriarch Mama Mabel. Knight and Tyler arrive to protect them, shortly followed by Cage and Lucas, and Cage asks Knight to call Rand for help.
22	9	"For Pete's Sake"	Clark Johnson	Matt Owens & Ian Stokes	June 22, 2018
Knight gets Cage, Lucas, Dillard, and Johnson to an unfinished building belonging to Rand Enterprises, where Dillard agrees to testify against Bushmaster in exchange for immunity. Knight and Cage are against this, but agree that they can only fight one at a time. Knight returns to the precinct, where Deputy Chief Priscilla Ridley is now in command. Cage tells Johnson that Dillard murdered their cousin Cornell "Cottonmouth" Stokes, and Dillard admits to this when Johnson confronts her. Dillard explains that Stokes was taunting her about how she had been raped as a girl by their Uncle Pete, and reveals that this was how Johnson was conceived and why Dillard does not love her. With Bushmaster putting up a large bounty for Dillard, Tyler tips him off to the group's location. There, Cage is able to defeat Bushmaster. Dillard escapes and reunites with Shades, who has captured Bushmaster's uncle Paul "Anansi" Mackintosh. Bushmaster also escapes, while being detained and transported by police, by setting off a grenade and then seeking out and forcing Johnson to heal him. Cage begins to reconcile with his father.
23	10	"The Main Ingredient"	Andy Goddard	Akela Cooper	June 22, 2018
Rand—who defends the rest of Manhattan as the Immortal Iron Fist (Note: As depicted in Iron Fist.)—meets up with Cage and insists on helping him find Bushmaster. Realizing that he would need to be healed following his escape from the police, they begin searching for Johnson but do not find her at her shop or at Harlem's Paradise. Working with a tip from Turk Barrett, they investigate an abandoned warehouse where the Jamaicans are attempting to grow more nightshade, but it requires the conditions of Jamaica. Cage and Rand fight their way through the men there, and destroy the lab when they do not find Johnson or Bushmaster. Knight and Ridley discover Tyler's betrayal and arrest her. Because Piranha was tortured before giving Dillard's money and assets to Bushmaster, these are legally returned to her and she reclaims Harlem's Paradise. Embracing her Stokes heritage, she has everyone at the Jamaican restaurant murdered, and then burns Anansi alive to send a message to Bushmaster. Shades is unsettled by her new behavior. Faith Evans and Jadakiss perform.
24	11	"The Creator"	Stephen Surjik	Nicole Mirante Matthews & Matthew Lopes	June 22, 2018
As a boy, Bushmaster had been the only child out of a group to survive a bad vaccination. After the business deal between his father, Quincy McIver, and Samuel "Buggy" Stokes broke down in the 1980s and led to their deaths, Bushmaster's mother Gwen tried to sue the Stokes family and Buggy's wife Mabel burned down Gwen's house in response. Bushmaster survived, but was shot by Pete Stokes. He was saved by nightshade, and now Johnson is able to heal him with it again. She warns that it is close to killing him through organ failure. He allows her to leave. Meanwhile, Cage finds Anansi's wife Ingrid, who survived the restaurant shooting, but she refuses to testify against Dillard. He takes her to see her husband's body, where they find Bushmaster; he and Cage agree that their next fight will be their last. Going against a Stokes family rule, Dillard makes a deal to start selling heroin in Harlem. Shades confronts her about her recent actions, leading to an altercation and an end to their relationship. He chooses to surrender himself to Knight.
25	12	"Can't Front on Me"	Everardo Gout	Aïda Mashaka Croal	June 22, 2018
Dillard takes the lead of a coalition of gang leaders from throughout New York, promising to take out Bushmaster, who is angered by the use of his name on the new heroin supply. He attacks the refinery where the drugs are being produced, shutting it down with Cage's help. Bushmaster flees when Cage refuses to let him destroy evidence of the drugs. Cage then visits Dillard, and tells her that he will no longer protect her. Dillard announces a free concert at Harlem's Paradise to ensure that there will be enough people around that Cage will show up to protect them from Bushmaster anyway. Johnson offers to help Bushmaster kill Dillard, showing him a secret entrance to the club and giving him extra nightshade as a final boost of strength. Shades confesses all he knows to the police, but they need proof that Dillard owns the gun used to kill Anansi. He goes to the club during the concert, and is with Dillard when Bushmaster attacks. Cage and Knight are able to stop Bushmaster, but he gets away when Cage refuses to kill him. Dillard is arrested. KRS-One performs.
26	13	"They Reminisce Over You"	Alex García López	Cheo Hodari Coker	June 22, 2018
With Dillard in prison, the other gang leaders go to war in the streets of Harlem. Shades suggests to Cage that he replace Dillard to prevent a new crime boss taking over. Cage threatens Italian boss Rosalie Carbone, ensuring she stays out of Harlem. In prison, Dillard makes moves to gain power and orders the murders of all of her former contacts and employees. Johnson helps Bushmaster begin to recover from his nightshade use, and he chooses to return to Jamaica. He tells her that Dillard must still burn. Johnson decides to visit Dillard, who tells her that Harlem's Paradise is her birthright. Johnson then gives Dillard a slow-acting poison, and she eventually dies while Cage is visiting. Johnson has her mother cremated. With Dillard dead, Shades' deal no longer holds and he is arrested. When Dillard's will is read, it has been changed so the club now goes to Cage. This angers Johnson, and concerns Knight who worries that Cage will become a criminal like Dillard. Cage still accepts the club, and establishes himself as the new "sheriff" of Harlem. Rakim, Adrian Younge, and Ali Shaheed Muhammad perform.

== Cast and characters ==
=== Main ===
- Mike Colter as Luke Cage
- Simone Missick as Mercedes "Misty" Knight
- Theo Rossi as Hernan "Shades" Alvarez
- Gabrielle Dennis as Tilda Johnson
- Mustafa Shakir as John "Bushmaster" McIver
- Alfre Woodard as Mariah Stokes-Dillard

==== Featured ====
- Jessica Henwick as Colleen Wing
- Finn Jones as Danny Rand / Iron Fist
- Stephen Rider as Blake Tower

=== Recurring ===
- Reg E. Cathey as James Lucas
- Ron Cephas Jones as Bobby Fish
- Peter Jay Fernandez as Tom Ridenhour
- Dorian Crossmon Missick as Dontrell "Cockroach" Hamilton
- Kevin Mambo as Sheldon
- Thomas Q. Jones as Darius "Comanche" Jones
- Jeremiah Richard Craft as D. W. Griffith
- Chaz Lamar Shepherd as Raymond "Piranha" Jones
- Sean Ringgold as Sugar
- Tarah Rodgers as Stephanie / Billie
- Sahr Ngaujah as Paul "Anansi" Mackintosh
- Danny Johnson as Benjamin "Big Ben" Donovan
- Antonique Smith as Nandi Tyler
- Justin Swain as Mark Bailey
- Heather Alicia Simms as Ingrid Mackintosh
- John Clarence Stewart as Alex Wesley
- Karen Pittman as Priscilla Ridley

=== Notable guests ===
- Rosario Dawson as Claire Temple
- Elden Henson as Foggy Nelson
- Frank Whaley as Rafael Scarfe
- Darius Kaleb as Lonnie Wilson
- Tijuana Ricks as Thembi Wallace
- Jade Wu as Connie Lin
- Andrew Pang as Donnie Chang
- Joniece Abbott-Pratt as Esther "Etta" Lucas
- Rob Morgan as Turk Barrett
- LaTanya Richardson Jackson as "Mama Mabel" Stokes
- Curtiss Cook as "Pistol Pete" Stokes
- Henry Yuk as Hai-Qing Yang
- Jayden D. Brown as Cornell "Cottonmouth" Stokes
- Ninja Devoe as Aisha Axton
- Cassandra Freeman as Patricia Wilson
- Sedly Bloomfield as Joel Spurlock

== Production ==
=== Development ===
In January 2015, Netflix CCO Ted Sarandos stated the series was "eligible to go into multiple seasons for sure" and Netflix would look at "how well [they] are addressing both the Marvel fanbase but also the broader fanbase" in terms of determining if additional seasons would be appropriate. In July 2015, Sarandos said some of the Defenders series would "selectively have multiple seasons as they come out of the gate." Regarding a second season, showrunner Cheo Hodari Coker stated he had "a few ideas", including possibly exploring the "Hero for Hire" aspect of Luke Cage, though noted he was not taking "any of this for granted" in terms of feeling a second season renewal from Netflix was guaranteed. Actor Mike Colter also felt "Heroes for Hire" could be explored in future seasons, as well as further exploring Cage's lifestyle change regarding his relationship with Jessica Jones and introducing the couple's daughter. In December 2016, Netflix renewed the series for a second season, of 13 episodes.

Coker compared the season to A Tribe Called Quest's second album The Low End Theory saying, their first album People's Instinctive Travels and the Paths of Rhythm "was great, but then Low End Theory was the record that everyone says ... when they think of A Tribe Called Quest taking it to the next level. That's my hope for season 2, is that we have some of the similar sounds, but we go in a deeper direction." Coker also noted that music would continue to be an important element for the season and that Harlem would still be "at the heart and its center" for the series.

=== Writing ===
In July 2017, Colter said the writing for the season was different from the first, because "we know the show now. We know the world that we're in and we know sort of what works and what doesn't work and we're just gonna double down on that stuff, so look forward to a very exciting and very relevant and pop culture-heavy show." He added that after the first season and the crossover miniseries The Defenders, Cage would have "a whole new outlook on life" and would not be dealing with the judicial system anymore. Coker explained that the storyline for the season did not come from any particular iteration of the comics, and instead was based on the characters that appear: "who is Luke Cage and getting much deeper into that, but also finding out different things about Mariah Dillard, also finding out things about Misty Knight," including getting her mechanical arm "and what that entails from an emotional standpoint." In particular, the new villains introduced for the season and their abilities impacted the story in terms of "what that represents against Luke". Each episode of the season is named after a Pete Rock & CL Smooth song, just as Coker named each episode of the first season after a Gang Starr song.

=== Casting ===
Mike Colter returns to star as Luke Cage, along with Simone Missick as Mercedes "Misty" Knight, Rosario Dawson as Claire Temple, Alfre Woodard as Mariah Stokes-Dillard, and Theo Rossi as Hernan "Shades" Alvarez. In July 2017, Marvel announced the casting of Mustafa Shakir as John "Bushmaster" McIver, and Gabrielle Dennis as Tilda Johnson.

Thomas Q. Jones reprises his role as Darius "Comanche" Jones in the season, along with Danny Johnson as Benjamin "Big Ben" Donovan, and Justin Swain as Mark Bailey. In October 2017, it was revealed that Finn Jones would be reprising his role as Danny Rand / Iron Fist in the season. Colter explained that there had been interest from fans to see more of the previously established relationship between Cage and Jessica Jones, but for this season they "went out on a limb" and decided to give to the fans of the "Heroes for Hire" instead by having Cage and Rand team up for part of the season. He added that Finn Jones "will bring some fresh blood in the new season". Jessica Henwick also reprises her Iron Fist role, appearing as Colleen Wing. Following the death of Reg E. Cathey in February 2018, Marvel revealed that his final performance was as Luke Cage's father James Lucas in this season. The character appeared briefly in the first season portrayed by an unnamed actor.

In March 2018, Annabella Sciorra was announced to have been cast in the "key role" of Rosalie Carbone. The next month, Antonique Smith joined the cast as Detective Nandi Tyler, a longtime rival of Misty Knight. Additionally, Elden Henson reprises his role as Foggy Nelson from previous Marvel/Netflix series.

The season also features cameo appearances by ESPN personalities Michael Smith, Jemele Hill, and Stephen A. Smith, and New York Jets head coach Todd Bowles, doubling as the head coach of the fictional Harlem Jets. As Coker is a sports fan, he decided to include the ESPN personalities and was partially motivated to reach out to Michael Smith and Hill out of "professional admiration". Coker noted the additional difficulty in getting the duo to appear because of Marvel's confidentiality requirements, meaning they could not see the scripts beforehand. Dialogue was written for the personalities, though each improvised some of it to make it sound like their own voice. Before reaching out to Bowles, Coker was going to ask David Shaw, head coach of the Stanford University Cardinal football team, since Shaw and Coker were college roommates, but the timing did not work out, as Shaw was recruiting students on the other side of the country. Coker then approached former Jets head coach Herm Edwards, since Edwards had one of Coker's "favorite coach meltdowns of all time", but Edwards also could not coordinate an appearance, resulting Coker approaching Bowles.

Writer, author, and educator Jelani Cobb also cameos in the season, appearing as himself on a talk show speaking to Luke Cage's ability to fix Harlem. Cobb, who has "an ambivalent relationship" to the character of Luke Cage, "went back and forth" on whether he would appear in the season. He noted, "I really like the show and thought it'd be a fun thing to do, but I also think that sometimes it's important for journalists to keep a separate line from what they're actually doing versus the imaginary stuff that they're doing, especially in the era of fake news." Cobb discussed the potential appearances with "some of the people I respect in the field" for their opinion, and after gaining their approval, agreed to appear.

=== Filming ===
Principal photography began by June 10, 2017, under the series' working title Tiara. Production wrapped that November.

=== Music ===
Music is at the center of every decision I make for the show, probably to the point where it annoys most people.

— Showrunner Cheo Hodari Coker on his use of music in Luke Cage

In July 2017, Colter said that the second season would have "another feel to it" in terms of the music, praising the season's musical guests and explaining that he and Coker had chosen a "certain type" of music for the season after listening to it at a birthday party and agreeing that there had "not been one bad song" played. Coker later explained that the season would explore the roots of hip-hop with blues and reggae, after the first season introduced hip-hop to the MCU. He added that the season would explore "the entire diaspora of black music" along with different cultures. Adrian Younge and Ali Shaheed Muhammad again composed the score for the season, working out of Younge's studio Linear Labs. Their music for the season included a "50-minute epic" for one of the episodes. Coker described the pair as being as "important to the success of the show as anyone in the cast, anyone directing, anyone writing, producing, period."

Coker wanted to have live musical performances in the season again after the first, and hoped that some musicians who had turned him down for the first season would be happy to join the second after getting to see the series. He noted that the idea of performing in the series was not a "home run in terms of the music community" during the first season, and he had to call in a lot of favors from his time as a music journalist to get the performers who did appear. For the second season, he was able to show footage of the first season performances as well as point out where musicians who performed on the show received "immediate streaming bumps" from fans discovering them through the series. With Coker subsequently having his "choice of acts", the season includes live performance from Faith Evans, returning from the first season, along with Joi & D-Nice, Gary Clark Jr., Esperanza Spalding, Christone "Kingfish" Ingram, Ghostface Killah, Stephen Marley, Jadakiss, KRS-One, and Rakim. The latter wrote an original song for the series, which he performs in the season finale. The season also includes music from Nina Simone and Mobb Deep.

=== Marvel Cinematic Universe tie-ins ===
Following the death of Captain Ridenhour, high-ranking detective Brigid O'Reilly is mentioned as having recently moved to New Orleans, in reference to that character's role in the Marvel Cinematic Universe (MCU) television series Cloak & Dagger (2018–2019).

== Marketing ==
An advanced screening of the season was hosted by Spotify, Netflix, and the Kennedy Center on June 19, followed by an after-party featuring musical performances by KRS-One, Younge and Muhammad, and surprise guests. The season had its red carpet premiere in New York City on June 21, 2018.

== Release ==
The second season of Luke Cage was released on June 22, 2018, on the streaming service Netflix worldwide, in Ultra HD 4K and high dynamic range. The season, along with the additional Luke Cage season and the other Marvel Netflix series, was removed from Netflix on March 1, 2022, due to Netflix's license for the series ending and Disney regaining the rights. The season became available on Disney+ in the United States, Canada, United Kingdom, Ireland, Australia, and New Zealand on March 16, ahead of its debut in Disney+'s other markets by the end of 2022.

== Reception ==
=== Critical response ===
The review aggregation website Rotten Tomatoes reported an 85% approval rating, with an average rating of 7.20/10 based on 62 reviews. The website's critical consensus reads, "Marvel's Luke Cage surpasses the successes of its debut season with a satisfyingly complex narrative and a solid ensemble cast led by Alfre Woodard's standout performance as the archvillainess Black Mariah." Metacritic, which uses a weighted average, assigned a score of 64 out of 100 based on 13 critics, indicating "generally favorable" reviews.

Awarding the "excellent" season four stars out of five, Olly Richards of Empire said, "Most of Marvel's superhero series suffer a mid-season sag, without enough plot to fill their episode quota. This season never succumbs to that because it's not rooted in plot but character. There are episodes where little happens in terms of event, but characters deepen and crack, becoming less who they want to be and more who they have to be, even Luke. Luke Cage could now remove any superhero elements almost entirely and still function as a series." David Betancourt of The Washington Post felt the season was "spectacular, full of unforgettable performances, and has not one but two top-notch villains". Though he felt the season started slow, the later episodes are "where the magic happens". Alison Keene at Collider felt the "last few episodes are fantastic — it just takes a lot to get there." Keene also felt "There are plenty of things this season does well, really well, but there is so much filler and narrative dragging of feet in between that it's hard to recommend it outright," awarding the season three stars out of four.

CNN's Brian Lowry was more critical of the season, feeling the season was "weaker" than the first, noting it was "not bad, overall, but still experiencing the equivalent of a sophomore slump." Similar to Lowry, Alan Sepinwall at Rolling Stone gave the season two stars out of four, noting the 13-episode season had "only three or four episodes' worth of story at best".

=== Accolades ===
Year	Award	Category	Nominee(s)	Result	Ref.
2017	Hollywood Music in Media Awards	Original Song – TV Show/Limited Series	"Bulletproof Love" for Method Man	Nominated	
2017	Hollywood Music in Media Awards	Main Title Theme – TV Show/Limited Series	Ali Shaheed Muhammad and Adrian Younge	Nominated	
2018	People's Choice Awards	The Sci-Fi/Fantasy Show of 2018	Luke Cage	Nominated	
2019	Black Reel TV Awards	Outstanding Guest Actor, Drama Series	Ron Cephas Jones	Nominated	
2019	Black Reel TV Awards	Outstanding Actress in a Drama Series	Alfre Woodard	Nominated	
