= List of Luke Cage characters =

Luke Cage is an American streaming television series created for Netflix by Cheo Hodari Coker, based on the Marvel Comics character of the same name. It is set in the Marvel Cinematic Universe (MCU), sharing continuity with the films of the franchise, and is the third in a series of shows that lead up to a Defenders crossover miniseries.

The series stars Mike Colter as Luke Cage, a former convict with superhuman strength and unbreakable skin who now fights crime. Simone Missick, Theo Rossi, Rosario Dawson, and Alfre Woodard also star. Colter reprises his role from the series Jessica Jones, while Dawson returns as Claire Temple from previous Marvel Netflix series. Mahershala Ali and Erik LaRay Harvey also star in the first season, while Gabrielle Dennis and Mustafa Shakir joined the cast for the second season, which also featured Jessica Henwick, Finn Jones, and Stephen Rider in separate single episodes. In addition to original characters, several characters based on various Marvel properties also appear throughout the series.

Colter and Jones reprise their roles in the Marvel Studios Disney+ series Daredevil: Born Again (2025–present).

== Overview ==
Character	Portrayed by	Appearances		
Character	Portrayed by	First	Season 1	Season 2
Main characters
Carl Lucas Luke Cage	Mike Colter	"Moment of Truth"	Main	Main
Misty Knight	Simone Missick	"Moment of Truth"	Main	Main
Hernan Alvarez Shades	Theo Rossi	"Moment of Truth"	Main	Main
Cornell Stokes Cottonmouth	Mahershala Ali	"Moment of Truth"	Main	Archive
Willis Stryker Diamondback	Erik LaRay Harvey	"Manifest"	Main	
Claire Temple	Rosario Dawson	"Just to Get a Rep"	Main	Guest
Mariah Stokes Dillard	Alfre Woodard	"Moment of Truth"	Main	Main
Tilda Johnson	Gabrielle Dennis	"Straighten It Out"		Main
John McIver Bushmaster	Mustafa Shakir	"Soul Brother #1"		Main
Colleen Wing	Jessica Henwick	"Wig Out"		Main (Note: Although credited as a main cast member, this actor only appears in one episode of the season.)
Danny Rand Iron Fist	Finn Jones	"The Main Ingredient"		Main
Blake Tower	Stephen Rider	"Now You're Mine"	Guest	Main
Recurring characters
Bobby Fish	Ron Cephas Jones	"Moment of Truth"	Recurring	Recurring
Rafael Scarfe	Frank Whaley	"Moment of Truth"	Recurring	Guest
Lonnie Wilson	Darius Kaleb	"Moment of Truth"	Recurring	Guest
Domingo Colon	Jacob Vargas	"Moment of Truth"	Recurring	
Connie Lin	Jade Wu	"Moment of Truth"	Recurring	Guest
Candace Miller	Deborah Ayorinde	"Moment of Truth"	Recurring	
Mark Bailey	Justin Swain	"Moment of Truth"	Recurring	Recurring
Zip	Jaiden Kaine	"Moment of Truth"	Recurring	
Sugar	Sean Ringgold	"Moment of Truth"	Recurring	Guest
Megan McLaren	Dawn-Lyen Gardner	"Moment of Truth"	Recurring	
Dave "D.W." Griffith	Jeremiah Richard Craft	"Moment of Truth"	Recurring	Recurring
Comanche	Thomas Q. Jones	"Step in the Arena"	Guest	Recurring
Noah Burstein	Michael Kostroff	"Step in the Arena"	Recurring	
Thembi Wallace	Tijuana Ricks	"Suckas Need Bodyguards"	Recurring	Guest
Alex Wesley	John Clarence Stewart	"Suckas Need Bodyguards"	Recurring	Recurring
Priscilla Ridley	Karen Pittman	"Manifest"	Recurring	
Benjamin "Big Ben" Donovan	Danny Johnson	"Manifest"	Guest	Recurring
James Lucas	Reg E. Cathey	"Soul Brother #1"	Stand-in	Recurring
Raymond "Piranha" Jones	Chaz Lamar Shepherd	"Soul Brother #1"		Recurring
Sheldon	Kevin Mambo	"Soul Brother #1"		Recurring
Stephanie Miller / "Billie"	Tarah Rodgers	"Soul Brother #1"		Recurring
Tom Ridenhour	Peter Jay Fernandez	"Soul Brother #1"		Recurring
Nandi Tyler	Antonique Smith	"Straighten It Out"		Recurring
Paul "Anansi" Mackintosh	Sahr Ngaujah	"Straighten It Out"		Recurring
Ingrid Mackintosh	Heather Alicia Simms	"Wig Out"		Recurring

== Main characters ==
=== Carl Lucas / Luke Cage ===
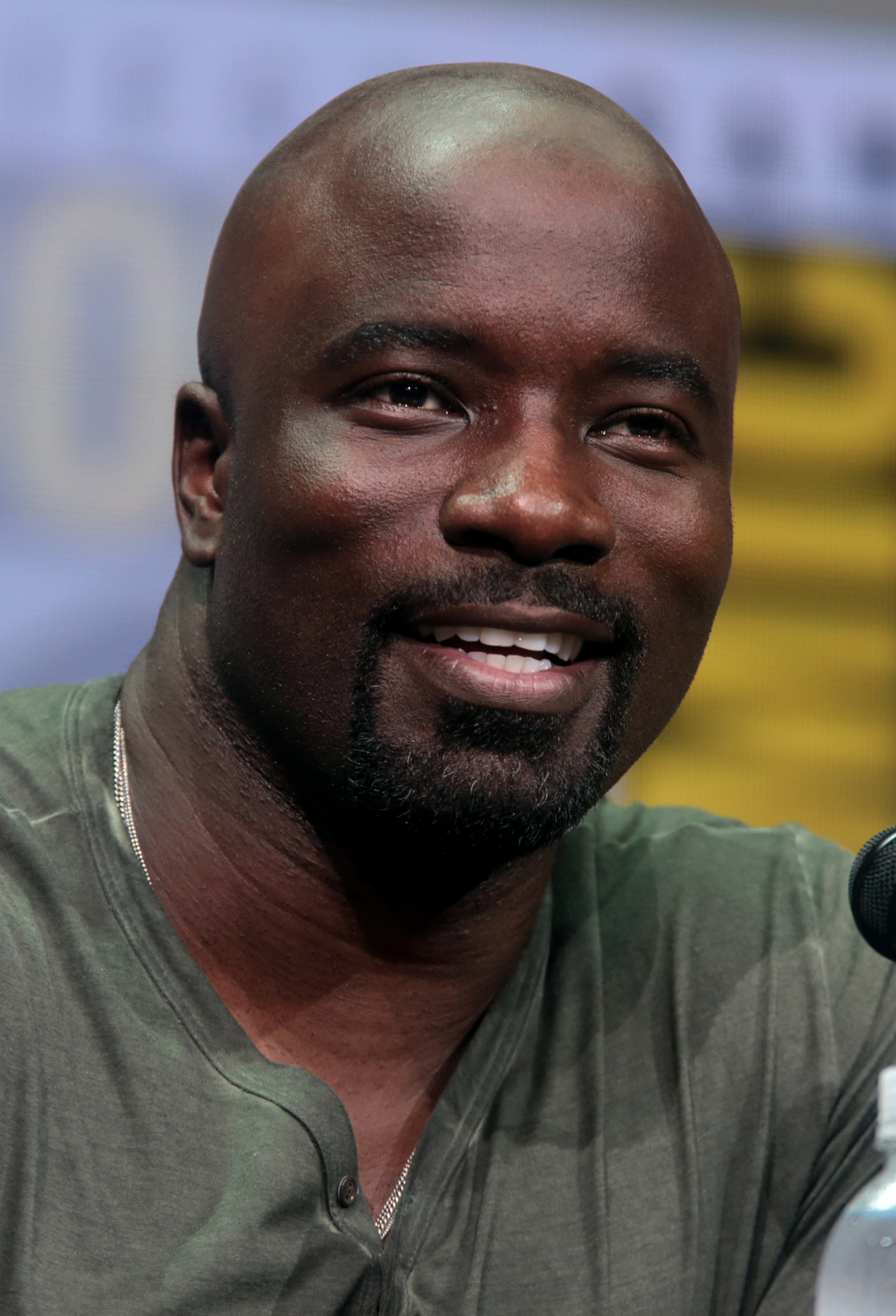
Mike Colter

Carl Lucas (portrayed by Mike Colter), a former convict who was given superhuman strength and unbreakable skin, now fights crime under the name Luke Cage.

By November 2014, Lance Gross, Colter, and Cleo Anthony were in contention for the role of Luke Cage, a recurring role on the series Marvel's Jessica Jones followed by a headlining role on Luke Cage. Colter was confirmed in the role the next month, as a series regular in both series. He signed on for the two shows without reading any scripts. Colter had been reluctant to sign on due to the comics depiction of the character, which he was familiar with already, saying "when I saw the tiara, all the 1970s blacksploitation stuff, I was like, 'oh my God...' But they assured me, '...we're doing a modern day version.'"

Colter discussed the differences in his portrayal in the two series, saying, "You're not always the same person around everyone you know ... you might not necessarily behave the same way around your mom that you would with your wife or your boss or your fraternity brothers." In Jessica Jones, Cage was vulnerable and "in a bit of a freefall", but in Luke Cage "he's trying to regroup and trying to figure out what's his next move. And then the events that happen in the first few episodes get him going, they catapult him into action." On factoring in race when playing the character, Colter said, "The approach with the character for me is more about the human qualities and the things that make Luke Cage tick ... the writers have to then decide to bring in the race of the character, if there's an angle there. But I don't look at it as something I have to prep differently for ... it's more of an aside". Colter put on 30 pounds (14 kg) of muscle for the role. David Austin and Clifton Cutrary portray a young and teenage Lucas, respectively.

Describing Cage, Colter said, "He's a neighborhood hero, very much linked to New York and Jessica Jones. It's all part of the Marvel Cinematic Universe but Luke Cage is a darker, grittier, more tangible character than Iron Man or Thor ... He has these abilities but he's not sure how and when to use them. Later elaborating, Colter said, "He's a renaissance man, he's trying to better himself and there's something to be said about someone who's always trying to make themselves better, trying to change." Colter noted that the character's catch phrase 'Sweet Christmas' is used in the series, saying "I was afraid of that phrase, but it actually fits so well, I don't know why, I don't know why it fits so well into Luke's mouth." The phrase is used sparingly though, with the character often "opting instead for pensive silence"; composer Adrian Younge said, "He's a black superhero, but he's a different type of black alpha male. He's not bombastic. You rarely see a modern black male character who is soulful and intelligent."

Colter reprised the role in the second season finale of the Marvel Studios' Disney+ series Daredevil: Born Again (2026), and is set to return in its third season (2027).

=== Cornell "Cottonmouth" Stokes ===
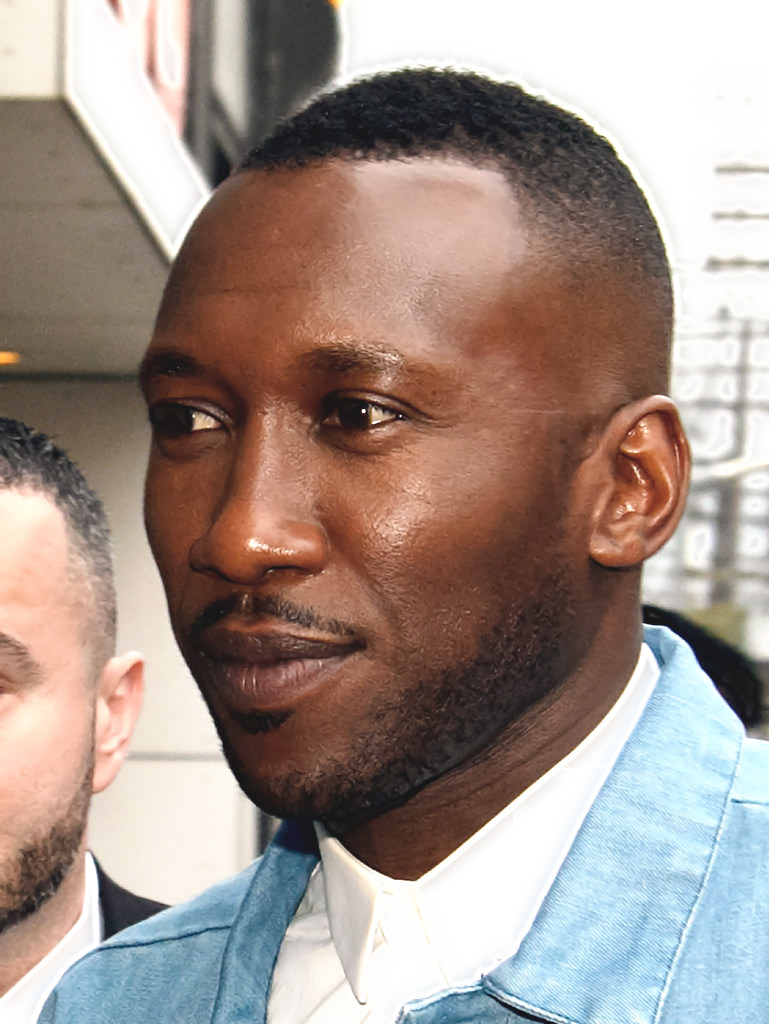
Mahershala Ali

Cornell "Cottonmouth" Stokes (portrayed by Mahershala Ali) is the owner of the Harlem's Paradise nightclub and the cousin of Mariah Dillard, who deals in illegal operations. He is later killed by an enraged Mariah who first framed Luke Cage for the murder and later shifted it to Diamondback.

Ali joined the cast as Stokes in September 2015, despite knowing that the character would die early on in the series. He compared the experience to "shooting a film, as opposed to stepping into another marriage that you never know how long is going to work out" explaining that when Netflix approached him "about Luke Cage, they gave me the arc, and for the first time, I found myself excited by a character's departure, because I felt like this was something I could give my all to for a period of time before saying 'peace' to him... It gave me a certain freedom to try to do my best work and make peace with it once he experiences his demise." Elijah Boothe portrays a young Stokes.

Ali described Stokes as "a Godfather-type villain", while Head of Marvel Television Jeph Loeb referred to him as "the other hero of the story", continuing the tradition of previous Marvel Netflix villains Wilson Fisk and Kilgrave. Ali felt that Stokes is "complicated in his own way. He's somebody who goes about things in a different way than the normal person, including myself." Showrunner Cheo Hodari Coker, a former music journalist, said that the attitude of rapper Biggie Smalls, whom Coker had been friends with, permeates Luke Cage but particularly influenced his version of Cottonmouth. Ali, who creates mixtapes for each of the characters he portrays so "sonically, the character has a soundtrack", stated that his mixtape for Cottonmouth took into account the fact that he was from Harlem, and included songs from Big L, Diamond D, Brand Nubian, D'Angelo, Mobb Deep, Kanye West, and Erykah Badu.

=== Misty Knight ===
Mercedes Kelly "Misty" Knight (portrayed by Simone Missick) is a Detective at the 29th Precinct and partner of Rafael Scarfe with a strong sense of justice, who is determined to learn about Cage. After losing her right arm in an encounter with Bakuto, she returns to the police force as Claire Temple and Colleen Wing help her cope with having one arm. She is later given a robotic arm by Danny Rand and Colleen Wing.

Missick, who was announced in the role of Knight in September 2015, described the character as "her own person. She's not the wife. She's not a girlfriend. She's not a sidepiece or a sidekick." Missick continued that Misty Knight is "a person who has a very strong moral compass who is absolutely dedicated to protecting her community", adding her proudest moment in playing the character, was that she "believes in the system, even though... [with] our current times, it's difficult to believe in the system." In approaching the character, Missick chose to not read the comics to avoid the expectations of fans, and instead focus on creating her version of the character. In the series, Knight has what Missick called a "superpower" referred to as 'Misty Vision' that allows her to look at a crime scene and deduce what happened.

=== Hernan "Shades" Alvarez ===
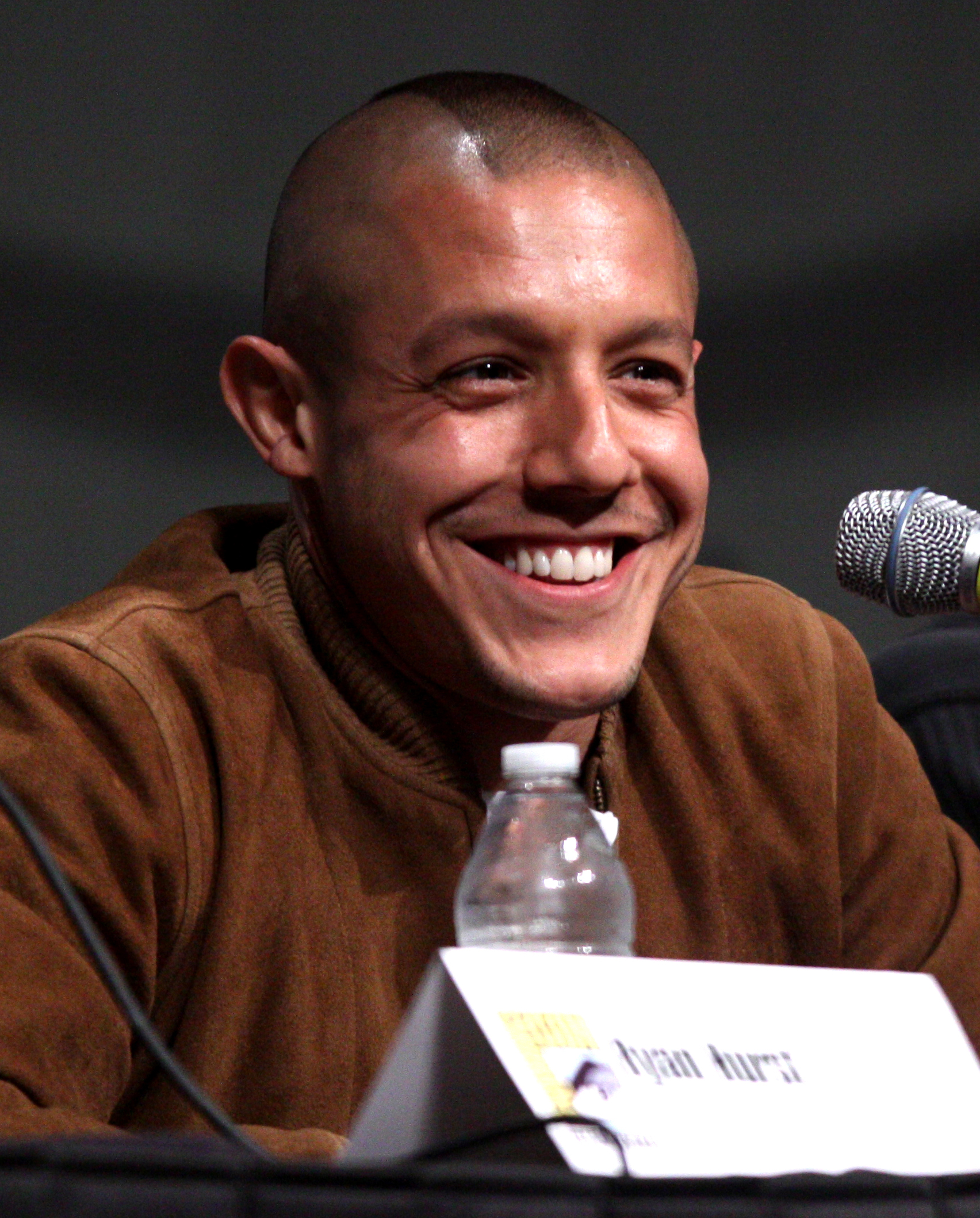
Theo Rossi

Hernan "Shades" Alvarez (portrayed by Theo Rossi) is a relentless, menacing, smooth and manipulative, street smart criminal working for Diamondback with ties to Cage's past where they were inmates at Seagate Prison. By the end of season two, Shades is arrested for the murder of Candace Miller and Comanche.

Rossi was announced as being cast as Shades in September 2015. Loeb called Shades "kind of the Littlefinger of Luke Cage", "the ultimate opportunist". He wears sunglasses for most of the series, and used Marvel's Daredevil and Charlie Cox's acting as research, since he could not use his eyes to act, similar to Cox as Matt Murdock.

=== Willis Stryker / Diamondback ===
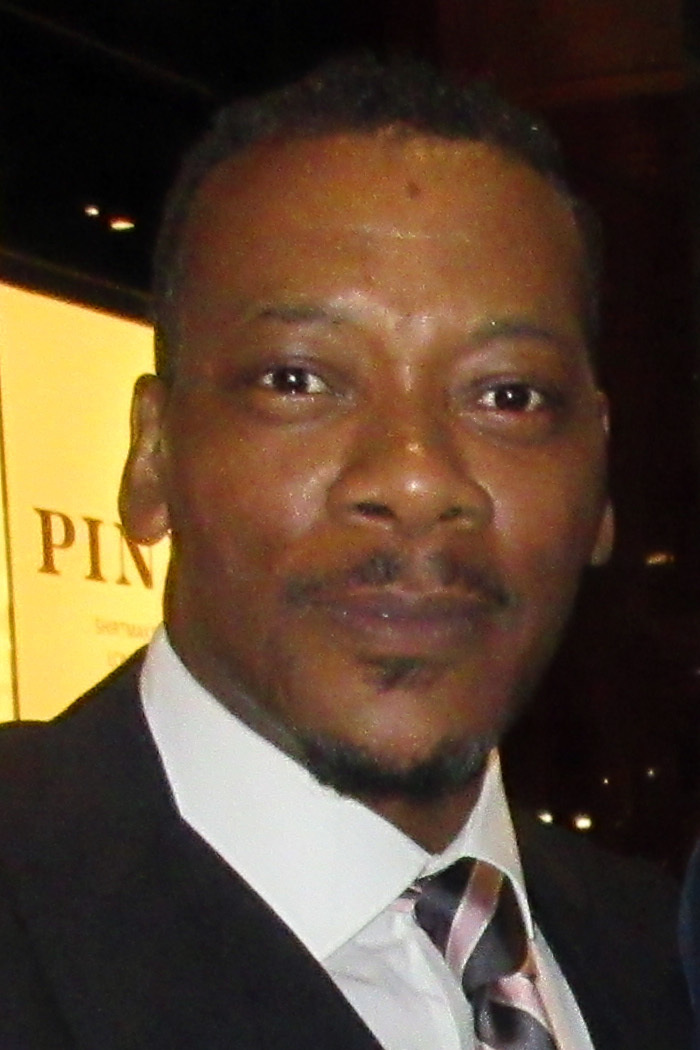
Erik LaRay Harvey

Willis Stryker (portrayed by Erik LaRay Harvey) is a powerful arms dealer who is Cage's half-brother and the one who framed him for the crime that sent him to Seagate Prison. He later has a showdown with Luke Cage outside of Pop's barbershop while sporting an exo-suit. Luke manages to defeat Diamondback, who is arrested by the police. Luke later tells Jessica Jones he had Stryker sent to the Raft.

In March 2016, set photos revealed that Harvey had been cast as Stryker in the series. This was not officially announced by Marvel prior to the series' release, and Harvey agreed not to do any publicity for the show, to not "ruin the twist" of Stryker being the series' main villain. Harvey chose not to read the comics to learn more about the character in order to not "interfere with what we were trying to do and cloud my judgment," instead relying on Coker to develop the 2016 version of Stryker, including adjusting his backstory to be the half-brother of Carl Lucas. However, Coker did try to bring as much of the comics' version of the character to the series as he could, including adapting the character's comic costume into armor that allows Stryker to match Cage's super strength. Jared Kemp portrays a teenage Stryker.

Harvey talked about the character's illegitimacy, saying, "My character had been called a bastard his whole life. How does that make a person operate? How would you feel if your childhood was illegitimized and ignored and swept under a rug? That's what drives Willis ... He gets sent away because of his father's actions and then once he's in the jail system, he just gets tortured. After all that, his mind's been twisted and warped, and he's developed this sensitivity that's almost psychopathic." Regarding the character's fighting style, Harvey worked with the series' fight coordinator to give Stryker "quick, really fast dabs and slithers" in his movement "because he's very elusive", given "Diamondback" is named after a species of snakes. The character is always seen smiling when killing or defaming Cage's name, which is "just his way of dealing with his pain. He smiles through his pain."

=== Claire Temple ===
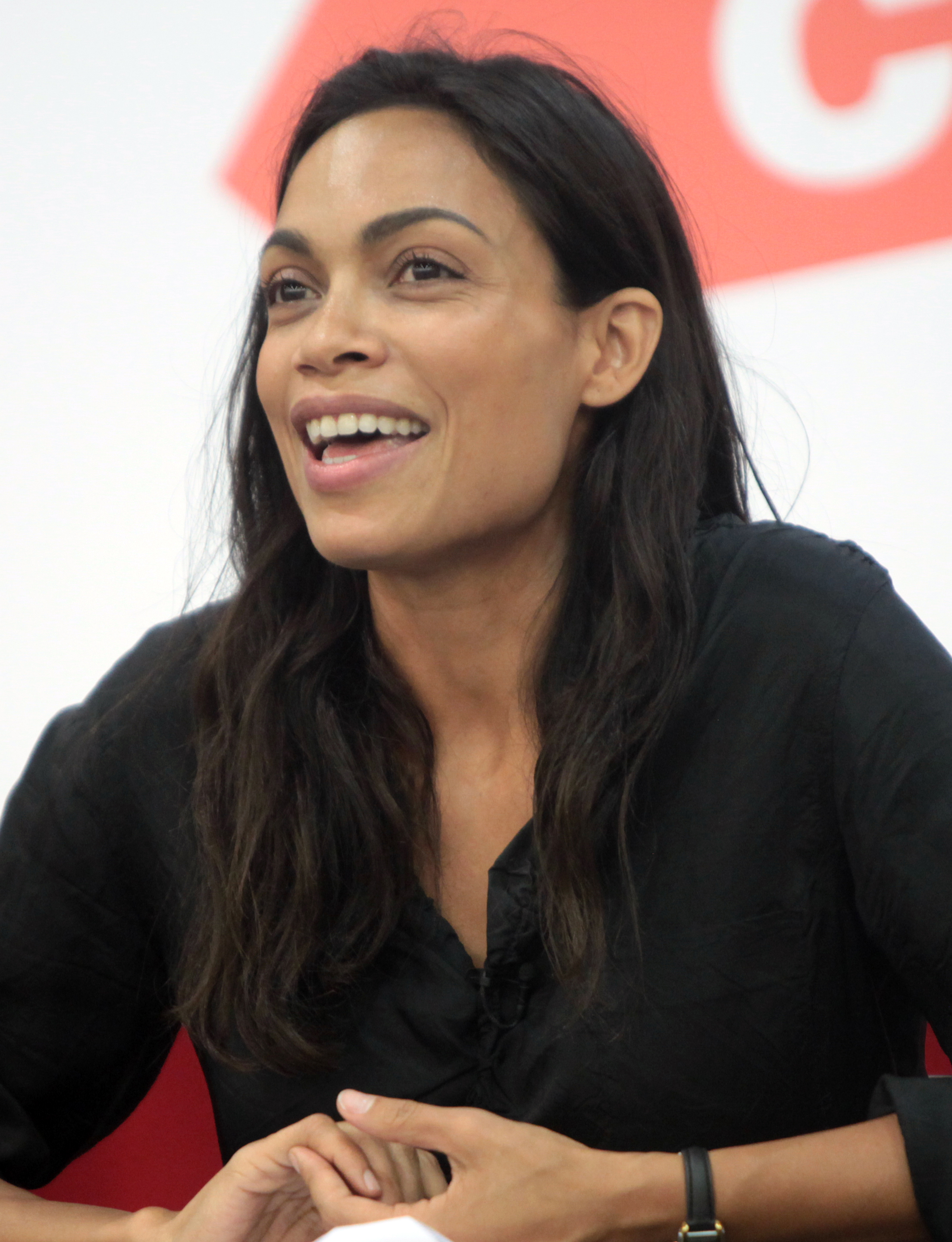
Rosario Dawson

Claire Temple (portrayed by Rosario Dawson) is a nurse in Hell's Kitchen, whose friendship with Cage will affect both of their lives.

In November 2015, Dawson was confirmed to be reprising her role of Temple from the previous Marvel Netflix series. "Because she plays a nurse that basically seems to be in the right place at the right time, and she's very good at helping out superheroes who are in need, and I think you will see some of that in Luke Cage," said Colter. "Ultimately I think she's going to be a very good companion for Luke. I think she's someone that Luke needs in his life at this time."

=== Mariah Stokes-Dillard ===
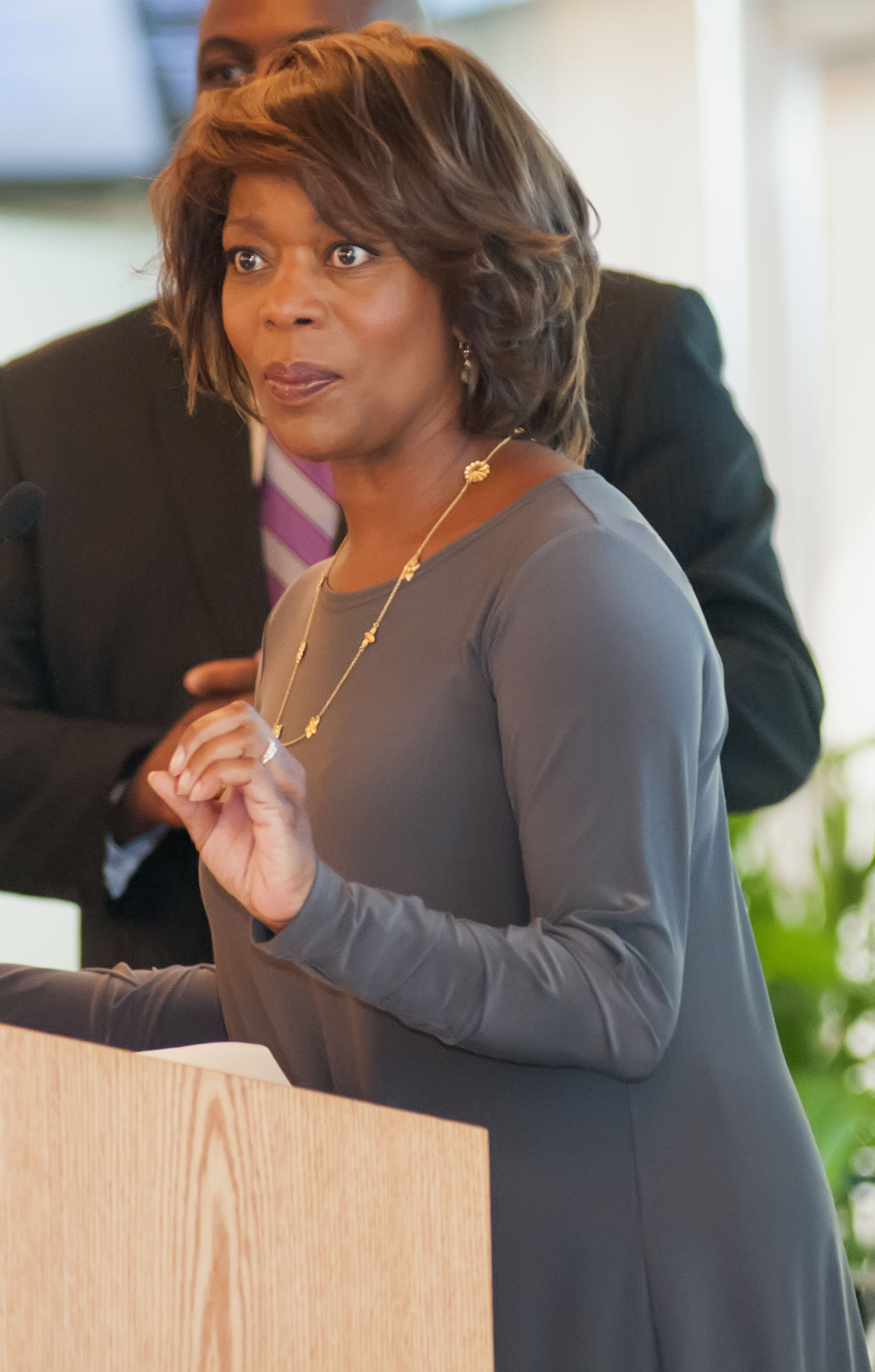
Alfre Woodard

Mariah Stokes-Dillard (portrayed by Alfre Woodard) is a local councilwoman, Stokes' cousin, and Tilda Johnson's mother looking to bring change to Harlem, whose life is "thrown into turmoil" by the actions of Cage and Stokes. By the end of season two, having embraced her birth name of Stokes, Mariah is arrested for her illegal activities, secretly poisoned by Tilda in her jail cell and dies from the poison.

In August 2015, Woodard, who portrays Miriam Sharpe in the MCU film Captain America: Civil War, was in talks to join the cast, and the following month she was confirmed as a series regular, portraying Dillard, a different character. Woodard, who lives in Harlem, felt that the scripts for the episodes were some "of the smartest pieces of writing [I'd] ever come across", and was convinced to join the project after Coker proved his love of Harlem and its culture. The series' version of the character is significantly different from the comics' Black Mariah, with her portrayed as not necessarily a criminal herself, though she does feel a responsibility to her family which includes Stokes. To pay homage to her origins, Coker wanted to give the character the nickname "Black Mariah", which Woodard agreed with if it was used sensitively. The nickname is ultimately used by Stokes as a personal insult from their past growing up together, in retaliation to Dillard verbally attacking him. Megan Miller portrays a young Dillard.

=== Tilda Johnson ===
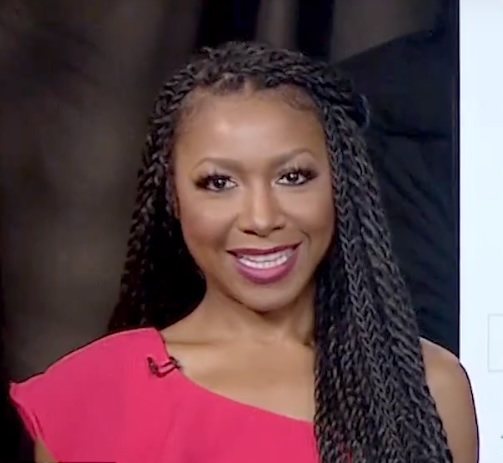
Gabrielle Dennis

Tilda Johnson (portrayed by Gabrielle Dennis) is an holistic doctor who cannot stay out of trouble in Harlem. She is the daughter of Mariah Dillard as the result of one of her rapes at the hands of Pistol Pete.

Dennis was announced as cast for the second season in July 2017.

=== John McIver / Bushmaster ===
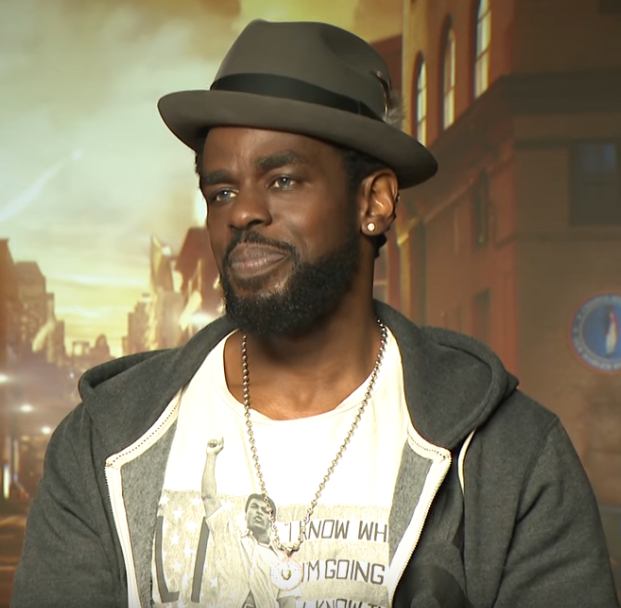
Mustafa Shakir

John McIver (portrayed by Mustafa Shakir) is a natural leader focused on Harlem and vengeance. He is the leader of the Yardies offshoot called the Stylers where he has a personal vendetta against the Stokes family for their double-crossing on his family. Using a drug called Nightshade, Bushmaster gets super-strength enough to go up against Luke Cage. By the end of the second season, Bushmaster is taken back to Jamaica with his uncle's corpse to recuperate and to assist his aunt into giving his uncle a proper funeral.

Shakir was announced as cast for the second season in July 2017.

=== Colleen Wing ===
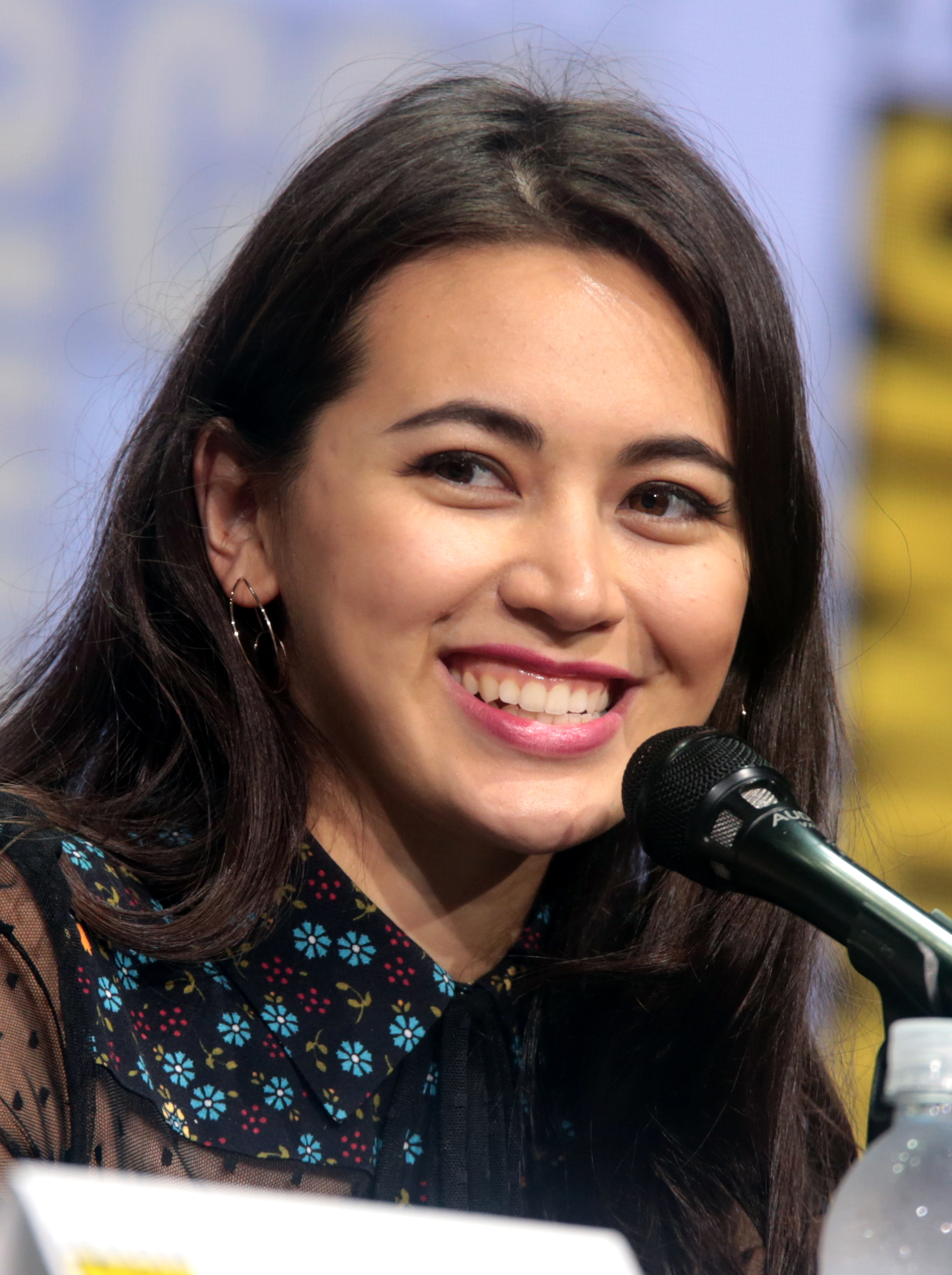
Jessica Henwick

Colleen Wing (portrayed by Jessica Henwick) is a former member of the Hand, Rand's lover, and the owner of a New York City dojo.

Colleen helps Misty Knight by training her to fight with one arm. As she and Misty Knight are having drinks in the bar, they are attacked by Mr. Fish. Colleen takes out Mr. Fish's minions as Misty Knight defeats Mr. Fish. Colleen later assists Danny Rand into giving Misty Knight a robotic arm to replace the one that she lost.

=== Danny Rand / Iron Fist ===
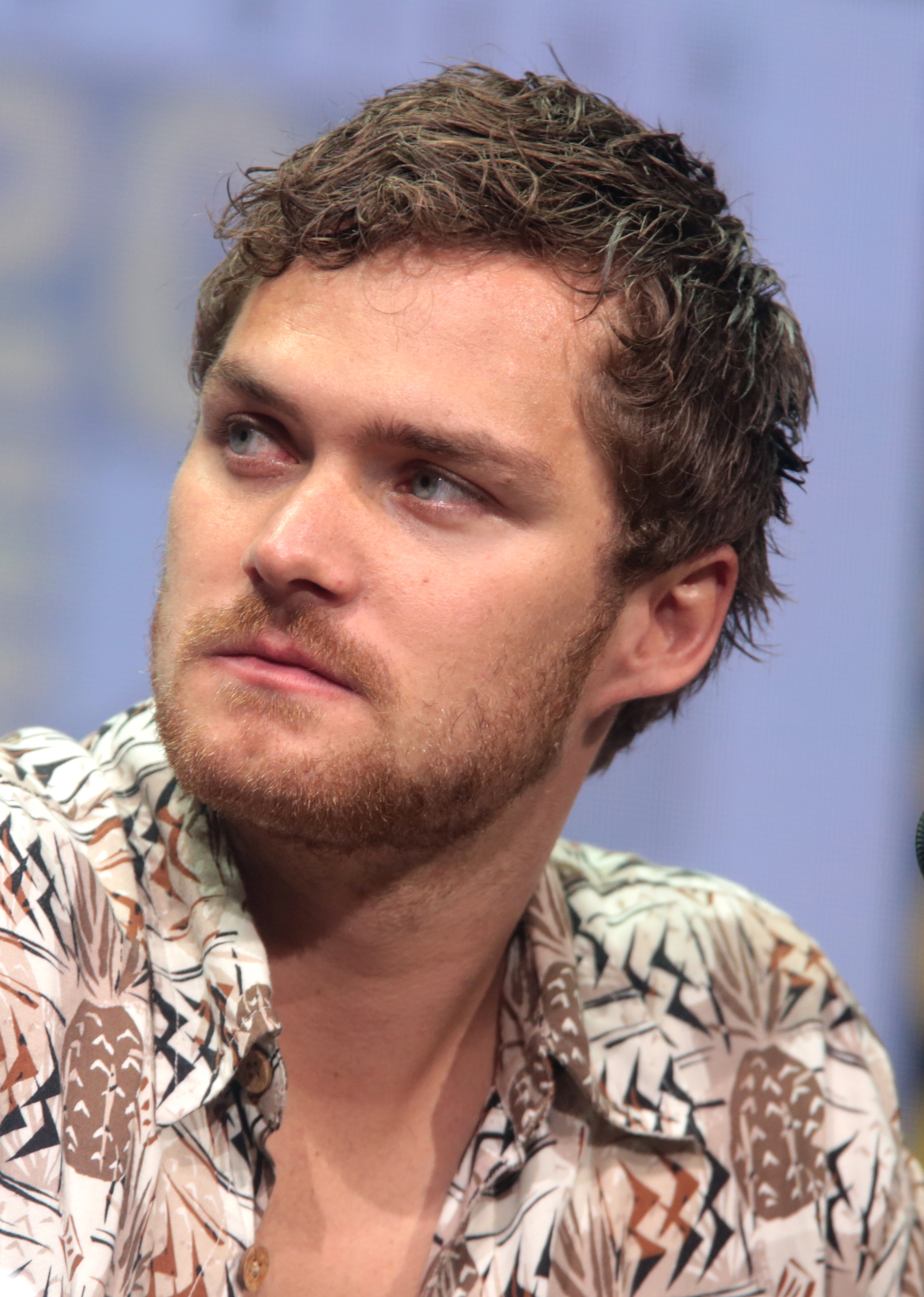
Finn Jones

Danny Rand / Iron Fist (portrayed by Finn Jones) is a billionaire Buddhist monk, co-CEO of Rand Enterprises, and martial arts expert with the ability to call upon the mystical power of the Iron Fist, who Luke partnered with during his investigation of the Hand during the events in The Defenders.

Danny Rand and Colleen Wing give Misty Knight a robotic arm to replace the one that she lost. He later helps Luke Cage in searching for Bushmaster.

Jones is set to reprise his role in the third season of Daredevil: Born Again (2027) on Disney+.

=== Blake Tower ===
Blake Tower (portrayed by Stephen Rider) is a New York assistant district attorney. He was first seen outside Harlem's Paradise where Diamondback was holding hostages. In Season Two, he prosecuted against Mariah Dillard at her arraignment.

== Recurring characters ==
The following is a list of guest characters that have recurring roles throughout the series. The characters are listed by the MCU media or season in which they first appeared.

=== Introduced in other TV series ===
==== Benjamin "Big Ben" Donovan ====
Benjamin "Big Ben" Donovan (portrayed by Danny Johnson as an adult, Chaundre Hall-Broomfield as a young man) is a lawyer known for representing high-profile criminals such as Stokes, Dillard and Wilson Fisk.

Johnson reprises his role from Daredevil.

=== Introduced in season one ===
==== Rafael Scarfe ====
Rafael Scarfe (portrayed by Frank Whaley) is a hard-nosed police detective at the NYPD's 29th Precinct and partner of Misty Knight who is on Stokes' payroll. After he was double-crossed and shot by Stokes, Rafael later died in Misty's arms. It was later revealed that he had a hand in the release of 30 criminals including Dontrell "Cockroach" Hamilton who he orchestrated the arrest on.

Whaley's role as Scarfe was announced alongside the series' main cast in September 2015. The actor described Scarfe's relationship with Misty Knight as one with "a great deal of love and respect for each other", given that Scarfe "is Misty's mentor... [who] showed her the ropes. She had this raw talent that he, unlike other people on the force, nurtured". When Scarfe is revealed to be corrupt, he is also shown to have had a son who is now dead. Whaley said on this, "It gives the guy a certain amount of complexity ... he's a very conflicted guy and probably has a lot of issues coming into the show with some stuff in his past that led him down that road. I know that he's solid with his partner. I think he has a good heart." Whaley's portrayal of Scarfe's relationship with Misty Knight was not affected by the character's reveal of being on Stokes' payroll, as Whaley was not aware of it until an episode before it was revealed.

==== Bobby Fish ====
Bobby Fish (portrayed by Ron Cephas Jones) is a local chess master and friend of Pop and Cage's.

==== Domingo Colon ====
Domingo Colon (portrayed by Jacob Vargas) is a gang leader from Spanish Harlem and business partner of Stokes and Dillard. He was killed by Diamondback.

==== Lonnie Wilson ====
Lonnie Wilson (portrayed by Darius Kaleb) is a young boy from Harlem. He meets Luke Cage, who looks out for Lonnie on the streets. Lonnie is taken into custody for questioning about Cage, and is given a brutal beating by Detective Dorsey. This leads to Lonnie's beating being spread through the media by a corrupted politician for their own benefit. He is a supporter of Luke Cage because he knows Cage is innocent of the crimes he has allegedly committed.

==== Connie Lin ====
Connie Lin (portrayed by Jade Wu) is one of the owners of the Genghis Connie's restaurant below Cage's apartment.

==== Candace Miller ====
Candace Miller (portrayed by Deborah Ayorinde) is a hostess at Harlem's Paradise who is paid by Mariah to falsely accuse Luke of Cottonmouth's murder. After Misty gets her to confess the truth, she is later killed by Shades following Luke Cage's fight with Diamondback.

==== Mark Bailey ====
Mark Bailey (portrayed by Justin Swain) is an NYPD officer at the NYPD's 29th Precinct focused on analytics. He becomes a partner and friend of Knight's. After Misty Knight lost her right arm during the fight with Bakuto, Mark was reassigned to Nandi Tyler until she was exposed for tipping off Bushmaster.

Swain was cast as Bailey after a blind audition, and did not learn that the series was Luke Cage until later receiving an e-mail welcoming him to the MCU. The character of Bailey was originally going to have an introductory scene in the fifth episode establishing his relationship with Knight in the series, but the scene was ultimately cut. The script mentioned Bailey taking off his glasses in a scene, so Swain brought a pair of his wife's glasses to the set. During his first scene, Swain "was looking at something close through my wife's prescription and I started to get dizzy", and quickly took the glasses off, which "became this character thing that Bailey did. He would look up and quickly take off his glasses." Swain felt his character was original for the series, despite a similarly named character appearing in X-Men comics that Swain "search[ed] pretty deep" to find.

==== Zip ====
Zip (portrayed by Jaiden Kaine) is a gangster who provides muscle for Cottonmouth. Following Cottonmouth's death, Diamondback promotes Zip to be his secondary advisor, behind only Shades. After Diamondback and Shades have a falling out, Diamondback offers to make Zip his second-in-command if he kills Shades. Zip tries to strangle Shades in a freight elevator, but Shades fights back, grabs a gun, kills both of the men accompanying Zip. After getting Zip to confess to Diamondback's duplicity, Shades shoots him in the head.

==== Sugar ====
Sugar (portrayed by Sean Ringgold) is one of Stokes' men. Following Cottonmouth's death, he went to work for Diamondback and Mariah Dillard. When Dillard began to spiral during her war with Bushmaster, he quit and went to Luke Cage where he now works for him.

==== Megan McLaren ====
Megan McLaren (portrayed by Dawn-Lyen Gardner) is a reporter for WJBP-TV.

==== Dave "D.W." Griffith ====
Dave "D.W." Griffith (portrayed by Jeremiah Richard Craft) is a young kid selling videos of superheroes in action.

==== Darius "Comanche" Jones ====
Darius "Comanche" Jones (portrayed by Thomas Q. Jones) is an inmate at Seagate Prison who worked for Rackham and was cellmates with Shades. After getting out, he rejoins his partner as one of Mariah Dillard's henchmen. Shades was later forced to kill Comanche when he found out that he was Tom Ridenhour's informant.

==== Noah Burstein ====
Noah Burstein (portrayed by Michael Kostroff) is a doctor at Seagate that give Lucas his powers due to his experiments.

==== Thembi Wallace ====
Thembi Wallace (portrayed by Tijuana Ricks) is a news reporter.

==== Alex Wesley ====
Alex Wesley (portrayed by John Clarence Stewart) is Mariah Dillard's assistant. By the end of season two, Alex was among those who were killed to avoid testifying against Mariah. This led to Tilda working to poison her mother.

==== Priscilla Ridley ====
Priscilla Ridley (portrayed by Karen Pittman) is an inspector in the NYPD's 29th Precinct and former sorority sister of Mariah Dillard who Misty Knight answers to. In season two, Priscilla has been promoted to deputy police chief.

==== James Lucas ====
James Lucas (portrayed by an unknown actor in season one, Reg E. Cathey in season two) is a pastor and the father of Luke Cage and Willis Stryker. The two have a strained relationship due to Cage's incarceration and his own adulterous affair with Dana Stryker.

=== Introduced in season two ===
==== Raymond "Piranha" Jones ====
Raymond "Piranha" Jones (portrayed by Chaz Lamar Shepherd) is a crime boss from wall-street who has ties to the Stokes and is obsessed with Luke Cage. He was later killed by Bushmaster who left his head in Mariah Dillard's fish tank filled with piranhas.

==== Sheldon ====
Sheldon (portrayed by Kevin Mambo as an adult, Antwayne Eccleston as a young man) is Bushmaster's right-hand man and member of the Stylers. After Bushmaster is taken back to Jamaica with his uncle's corpse, Sheldon visits Pop's barbershop to let Luke know that Bushmaster has left and shows Luke some respect.

==== Stephanie Miller / "Billie" ====
Stephanie Miller (portrayed by Tarah Rodgers) is an escort hired by Mariah Dillard who renames her Billie in an effort to use her in her latest scheme.

==== Tom Ridenhour ====
Tom Ridenhour (portrayed by Peter Jay Fernandez) is a police captain and Misty Knight's new superior who does not approve of Cage's style of justice. He gained an informant in Comanche until he was killed by him when Shades was nearby.

==== Nandi Tyler ====
Nandi Tyler (portrayed by Antonique Smith) is a detective and longtime rival of Misty Knight. She is later arrested by Misty Knight and Priscilla Ridley after they discover that she had sided with Bushmaster.

==== Paul "Anansi" Mackintosh ====
Paul "Anansi" Mackintosh (portrayed by Sahr Ngaujah) is Bushmaster's uncle and a former criminal in his own right who runs a Jamaican bar called "Gwen's" which is named after his sister-in-law Gwen McIver. He is later killed by Mariah Dillard. The death of Paul causes Bushmaster and Ingrid to take him home to Jamaica to give him a proper funeral.

==== Ingrid Mackintosh ====
Ingrid Mackintosh (portrayed by Heather Alicia Simms) is Anansi's wife and Bushmaster's aunt who runs a Jamaican bar. She survived the massacre caused by Mariah Dillard and assists Bushmaster into taking Anansi's corpse back to Jamaica to give him a proper funeral.

== Guest characters ==
The following is a supplementary list of guest stars that appear in lesser roles or make significant cameo appearances. The characters are listed by the MCU media or season in which they first appeared.

=== Introduced in other TV series ===
- Reva Connors (portrayed by Parisa Fitz-Henley; first appears in season one): Cage's deceased wife, who started out as a Seagate Prison therapist.
- Turk Barrett (portrayed by Rob Morgan; first appears in season one): An arms dealer.
- Trish Walker (voiced by Rachael Taylor; first heard in season one): Jessica Jones' best friend who works as a radio host.
- Franklin "Foggy" Nelson (portrayed by Elden Henson; first appears in season two): A lawyer at Hogarth, Chao & Benowitz who represents Luke Cage.
- Hai-Qing Yang (portrayed by Henry Yuk; first appears in season two): The leader of the Yangsi Gonshi that is an uneasy ally of Danny Rand.

=== Introduced in season one ===
- Henry "Pop" Hunter (portrayed by Frankie Faison as an adult, Edwin Freeman as a young man): A reformed gangster and proprietor of Pop's Barbershop who is considered Harlem's father figure. He is killed by Tone.
- Patricia Wilson (portrayed by Cassandra Freeman): Lonnie Wilson's mother and lawyer who is interested in Cage.
- Wilfredo "Chico" Diaz (portrayed by Brian "Sene" Marc): A local boy who gets caught up in crime. A key witness, he is killed by the corrupt detective Scarfe.
- Jin Lin (portrayed by Clem Cheung): One of the owners of the Genghis Connie's restaurant.
- Tone (portrayed by Warner Miller): One of Stokes' men who led the attack on Pop's Barbershop. He is killed when Stokes throws him off the roof of Harlem's Paradise for what happened to Pop.
- Albert Rackham (portrayed by Chance Kelly): A corrupt guard at Seagate Prison who recruits Carl Lucas for the inmate fight ring. He is killed in the accident that gave Luke Cage his powers.
- Reggie "Squabbles" (portrayed by Craig Mums Grant): An inmate at Seagate Prison that Lucas befriends. He is killed offscreen on Rackham's orders.
- Perez (portrayed by Manny Pérez): A lieutenant in the NYPD's 29th Precinct who is on Stokes' payroll.
- Soledad Temple (portrayed by Sônia Braga): Claire Temple's mother.
- Betty Audrey (portrayed by Sonja Sohn): A police captain in the NYPD's 29th Precinct who takes the fall for the exposure of the corruption in her precinct.
- Mama Mabel (portrayed by LaTanya Richardson Jackson): The grandmother of Cornell Stokes and Mariah Dillard, who lead the Stokes crime family when they were young.
- Pistol Pete (portrayed by Curtiss Cook): Mama Mabel's brother-in-law and right-hand who sexually abused Dillard when she was young. One of these activities led to Mariah giving birth to Tilda. Mabel forced Cornell to kill Pete.
- Damon Boone (portrayed by Clark Jackson): Dillard's rival for the Harlem council. He was later kidnapped and killed by Diamondback.
- Dana Stryker (portrayed by Natalie Paul): Willis Stryker's mother.
- Esther "Etta" Lucas (portrayed by Joniece Abbott-Pratt): Cage's mother and James' wife. Based on the comic character who first appeared in Cage #3 (June 1992).
- Mario Green (portrayed by PJ Marshall): A lieutenant of the Emergency Service Unit of the NYPD's 29th Precinct.
- Donnie Chang (portrayed by Andrew Pang): A detective of the NYPD's 29th Precinct.

Stan Lee makes a cameo appearance through an on-set photograph, the same seen in previous Marvel Netflix series. In Iron Fist, Lee's character is identified as NYPD Captain Irving Forbush.

Raphael Saadiq, d-Nice, Faith Evans, Charles Bradley, Jidenna, Dapper Dan, The Delfonics, Cliff "Method Man" Smith, Sway Calloway, Heather B., Sharon Jones & The Dap-Kings, and Fab Five Freddy all appear as themselves.

=== Introduced in season two ===
- Arturo Rey "El Ray" III (portrayed by Otto Sanchez): A drug dealer covering as a furniture salesman who tries to buy Dillard's assets. He is later killed by Shades and Comanche.
- Dontrell "Cockroach" Hamilton (portrayed by Dorian Missick): A low level thug working under his employer Piranha Jones. He is later killed and beheaded by Bushmaster.
- Drea Powell (portrayed by Michelle Beck): Cockroach Hamilton's girlfriend who suffers abuse at his hands.
- C. J. Powell (portrayed by Christopher King): Cockroach Hamilton's son who looks up to Luke Cage and tries to protect his mom.
- Mortimer "Mr. Fish" Norris (portrayed by Hakim Callender): A minor criminal who wants revenge on Misty Knight for imprisoning his brother Bill at Dannemora.
- Gideon Shaw (portrayed by R.A. Guirand): An old friend of Bushmaster's who is incarcerated. Misty Knight goes to him for information.
- Mark Higgins (portrayed by Jeorge Watson): The CEO of Atreus Plastics and one of Mariah Dillard's "allies" who have been blackmailed by her to go ahead with the merger. He is later killed and beheaded by Bushmaster.
- Andre "Ray-Ray" Jackson (portrayed by Los Jones): Shades' personal assistant. He is later killed and beheaded by Bushmaster.
- Nigel Garrison (portrayed by Macc H. Plaise as an adult, Alex Allen as a young man): The leader of the Yardies and Miriah Dillard's rival who is killed by Bushmaster.
- Detective Tomas Ciancio (portrayed by Rey Lucas): A friend of Misty's working in Brooklyn who has information about Bushmaster and where he is from.
- Wendy Dunnavant (portrayed by Carolyn Michelle Smith): A friend and adviser to Dillard who suggests that she reunite with her daughter Tilda.
- Janis Jones (portrayed by LaTonya Borsay): Comanche's mother who mourns his death. She later despises Shades when she finds out that he is responsible for her son's death..
- Kalinda "Sunflower" Reynolds (portrayed by Delissa Reynolds): A former prostitute, follower of Pistol Pete and inmate at Ryker's Prison who knew Dillard. She is killed by her.
- Rosalie Carbone (portrayed by Annabella Sciorra): A criminal underworld "power player" with an agenda involving Harlem.

Stan Lee makes another cameo this season as a flyer.

Faith Evans, Joi & D-Nice, Gary Clark Jr., Esperanza Spalding, Christone "Kingfish" Ingram, Ghostface Killah, Stephen Marley, Jadakiss, KRS-One, and Rakim all appear as themselves.

== See also ==
- Daredevil cast and characters
- Jessica Jones cast and characters
- Iron Fist cast and characters
- The Defenders cast and characters
