= Justin Swain =

American actor

- Occupation: Actor
- Years active: 2006–present

Justin Swain is an American actor, best known for his role as Detective Mark Bailey in the Netflix series Marvel's Luke Cage.

== Early life ==
Born outside of Boston in Stoneham, Massachusetts, Swain was raised in New Hampshire before he returned to Boston to attend Emerson College.

== Career ==
Swain’s additional acting credits include Oscar nominated film The Post (film) directed by Steven Spielberg, HBO’s “Muhammad Ali’s Greatest Fight”, “The Blacklist”, “Forever”, “Boardwalk Empire”, “Law & Order” and “Law & Order: SVU”.

Alongside his acting career, Swain has written for film and television. He has developed pilots under the guidance of Christina Wayne (“Mad Men” and “Breaking Bad”) and Academy Award and Emmy winning producer Cary Brokaw (“The Player”, “Closer”, and “Angeles in America”).

Swain is also an award-winning playwright whose work has been commissioned by multiple theater companies and performed in New York City at 46East 46th Street in the Dread Awakening Theater festival alongside Roberto Aguirre Sacasa as well as The Ohio Theater, The Henry Street Settlement and The American Place Theatre. His plays have also been produced in New York, Chicago, and Miami.

== Filmography ==
Film roles
Year	Title	Role
2017	The Post	Neil Sheehan

Television roles
Year	Title	Role	Notes
2016-2018	Luke Cage	Detective Mark Bailey	Recurring role; 16 episodes
2016	The Blacklist	FBI Agent	Episode: "The Director No. 24"
2014	Forever	Immigrant Father	Episode: "The Pugilist Break"
2011	Law & Order	CSU Investigator	Episode: "Four Cops Shot"
2010	Boardwalk Empire	Patrick	Episode: "Battle of the Century "
2006	Law & Order: Special Victims Unit	Camera Guy	Episode: "Manipulated"
