= Darius Kaleb =

American actor

Darius Kaleb is an American actor and musician that achieved recognition through his role in the Netflix original Luke Cage, as well as playing parts in multiple shows on Broadway. Kaleb also featured in a Japanese live show tour as a fictional Michael Jackson.

He and his siblings formed the band, The Brothers Harris, with Kaleb himself acting as the drummer. They were all home-schooled.

== Acting career ==
=== Netflix Original - Luke Cage ===
Kaleb plays the character “Lonnie Wilson” in the Netflix original series Luke Cage. The character depicts the struggles of black youth in modern American society, and deals with social issues pertinent to that culture. His role as Lonnie Wilson addresses issues surrounding police brutality towards young African Americans.

Lonnie Wilson is a kid from Harlem, where the show is located. He meets Luke Cage, the main character, who looks out for him on the streets. Lonnie is taken into custody for questioning about Luke Cage, and is given a brutal beating by one of the police officers. This leads to a leak of the abusive treatment to the media by corrupt politicians—for their own benefit. In this role, he is a supporter of Luke's whom he knows is innocent of the crimes he has allegedly committed.

=== STEPS (Independent Film) ===
In this independent film written by Eddie B. Harris, Kaleb plays "Omar" the son of the main character "Brian". Kaleb's character in the film is a symbol of what his father had lost and what he was striving to regain by taking steps toward redemption.

=== ABC pilot - Delores & Jermaine ===
ABC Network has cast Darius Kaleb as "Jamaal", the younger brother, in Whoopi Goldberg and Jermaine Fowler's new pilot series Delores and Jermaine.

The new pilot is about Jermaine, a young millennial who after being kicked out of his house, moves in with his grandmother Delores, who after quitting her job as a DC cop never leaves her home anymore. The two of them end up needing each other more than they would have thought, as Jermaine is in need of parental guidance, while Delores needs a push to get her back into the world.

=== Broadway performances ===
Kaleb has had a career on Broadway. He played parts in multiple shows, alongside some big celebrities. When he was 11 years old, Kaleb starred in the play A Raisin in the Sun written by Lorraine Hansberry, which also starred LaTanya Richardson and Denzel Washington. He also starred in the hit Broadway musical, Motown the Musical written by Berry Gordy Jr. Kaleb was the youngest actor in the musical, and even played three roles; those of Michael Jackson, Stevie Wonder, and Berry Gordy Jr. himself. However, before performing on Broadway in NYC, Kaleb toured Japan, where he played the role of young Michael Jackson in Thriller Live.

== Music ==
Aside from plays, he also has his foot in the door in the music industry. He started a band, The Brothers Harris, along with his twin brothers who attend Berklee College of Music, with him being the drummer. He also has a love for singing and produces music as well.

== Personal life ==
Darius Kaleb and his family live in Charles County, Maryland. His older twin brothers are also involved in the performing arts—they are both musicians and the three brothers enjoy playing together.

Kaleb supports the Los Angeles Lakers and the Dallas Cowboys.

With all of the success that Kaleb has enjoyed, he received no formal training. His gift comes from being part of a musically and artistically talented family. He has also ventured into writing and is currently working on a short film called "The Audition".

== Awards ==
Kaleb was awarded the Black Essence Hall of Fame/Youth Division recognition.
