= Luke Cage season 1 =

Luke Cage
- Season 1
- Promotional poster
- Showrunner: Cheo Hodari Coker
- Starring: Mike Colter; Mahershala Ali; Simone Missick; Theo Rossi; Erik LaRay Harvey; Rosario Dawson; Alfre Woodard
- No. of episodes: 13

Release
- Original network: Netflix
- Original release: September 30, 2016

Season chronology
- Next → Season 2

The first season of the American streaming television series Luke Cage, which is based on the Marvel Comics character of the same name, follows Luke Cage, a former convict with superhuman strength and unbreakable skin who fights crime in Harlem, New York. It is set in the Marvel Cinematic Universe (MCU), sharing continuity with the films and other television series of the franchise. The season was produced by Marvel Television in association with ABC Studios, with Cheo Hodari Coker serving as showrunner.

Mike Colter stars as Cage, reprising his role from the series Jessica Jones. He is joined by principal cast members Mahershala Ali, Simone Missick, Theo Rossi, Erik LaRay Harvey, Rosario Dawson, and Alfre Woodard. Luke Cage entered development in late 2013, and Colter was cast, to appear in Jessica Jones and star in Luke Cage, in December 2014. Production took place in New York City from September 2015 to March 2016, with the season exploring race and politics while looking to replicate the atmosphere and culture of Harlem. Coker especially emphasized the use of music: Adrian Younge and Ali Shaheed Muhammad composed a "'90s hip-hop" score; various artists give onscreen performances in the fictional nightclub Harlem's Paradise throughout the season; and each episode is named after a Gang Starr song. Visual effects, including for the depiction of Cage's abilities, were provided by FuseFX.

The first two episodes of the season premiered in Harlem on September 28, 2016, with the full season of 13 episodes released on Netflix on September 30 to an estimated high viewership—it was believed to become the fourth most-viewed season on Netflix within 30 days of its release—and positive reviews, particularly for the first 7 episodes. Critics praised the cast, especially the performances of Ali and Woodard, as well as the music and general style. Its pacing and some writing were viewed as some of the season's shortcomings. The series' approach to racial issues was discussed by many commentators. The season won several awards, including a Primetime Emmy Award. A second season of Luke Cage was ordered on December 3, 2016.

== Episodes ==
No. overall	No. in season	Title (Note: Each episode is named after a Gang Starr song, chosen based on their titles only, so each episode's events does not necessarily reflect the respective song's lyrics.)	Directed by	Written by	Original release date
1	1	"Moment of Truth"	Paul McGuigan	Cheo Hodari Coker	September 30, 2016
Luke Cage, a former convict with superhuman strength and unbreakable skin, keeps a low profile as a sweeper at ex-gangster Henry "Pop" Hunter's barbershop, and as a dishwasher at crime boss Cornell "Cottonmouth" Stokes' nightclub, Harlem's Paradise. Cage spends one night as a bartender for Stokes, filling in for Dante, who calls in sick. Dante is actually attacking an arms deal between Stokes' men and gang leader Domingo Colon with his friends Shameek and Wilfredo "Chico" Diaz. Dante panics and is killed by Shameek, who escapes with Chico and the money. NYPD detectives Misty Knight and Rafael Scarfe investigate, and impound the Hammer Industries weapons that Stokes was selling. With help from Hernan "Shades" Alvarez, who works for Stokes' supplier Diamondback, Stokes tracks and kills Shameek and retrieves his share of the money. Stokes' men also support his cousin Mariah Dillard, a New York City Council member, and demand contributions to her cause from Cage's landlords. Cage fights them off, but refuses payment for his actions. Raphael Saadiq performs his songs "Good Man" and "Angel" at Harlem's Paradise. Coker chose the latter when it "just had a hook on it", and Saadiq finished it specifically for the series. d-Nice also appears as the resident DJ at Harlem's Paradise.
2	2	"Code of the Streets"	Paul McGuigan	Cheo Hodari Coker	September 30, 2016
Pop asks Cage to find Chico, as Cage owes Pop for keeping his convict past and superpowers a secret. Pop wants Chico brought to the barbershop, which is considered to be the "Switzerland" of Harlem. While out, Cage sees Stokes deliver Shameek's money to Dillard's memorial Crispus Attucks Complex; Dillard used her campaign donations to refurbish Harlem's Paradise for Stokes, and he is repaying her with the money from the arms deal. Cage finds Chico and convinces him to hide out at the barbershop. Knight and Scarfe visit the barbershop looking for Chico, but Pop keeps his location secret, and instead sends Cage to offer a parlay to Stokes. Stokes agrees due to growing up on the streets with Chico's father and Pop, but his right-hand man Tone is tipped off to Chico's location by Turk Barrett. Tone shoots up the barbershop, injuring Chico and killing Pop. Stokes later throws Tone to his death from the roof of the nightclub, and mourns for Pop. Dillard takes the remainder of the money to Crispus Attucks. Faith Evans performs "Mesmerized" at Harlem's Paradise.
3	3	"Who's Gonna Take the Weight?"	Guillermo Navarro	Matt Owens	September 30, 2016
Stokes offers to pay for Pop's funeral, and after explaining that he had not known what Tone was going to do, tells Cage to let go of the matter. Cage finds out from a regular customer, Bobby Fish, that the barbershop is facing closure due to unpaid bills, and decides to take Stokes' money to cover the debt and re-open the shop. He visits Chico in the hospital and learns that Stokes moves all of his money to Crispus Attucks during a crisis. Cage begins targeting Stokes' business, framing Colon. Stokes moves all his money to Crispus Attucks in response, and Cage attacks the complex while Dillard is out, taking out her guards and stealing a small share of the money to give to Fish. Knight and Scarfe arrive soon to impound the rest of the money. Chico approaches Scarfe, offering to testify against Stokes and revealing that it was Cage who attacked the complex. Scarfe, who is actually on Stokes' payroll, kills Chico and tells Stokes about Cage. Stokes goes to the restaurant where Cage is living and fires a missile at the building. Charles Bradley sings "Ain't It a Sin".
4	4	"Step in the Arena"	Vincenzo Natali	Charles Murray	September 30, 2016
In the rubble of the destroyed restaurant, Cage recalls his past as policeman Carl Lucas—framed for a crime and incarcerated at Seagate Prison, a prison run by correctional officer Albert Rackham. He befriends fellow inmate Squabbles; develops an attraction to psychologist Reva Connors; is forced to engage in illegal ring fights by Rackham; and crosses paths with Shades, also an inmate then. Lucas and Connors plan to expose Rackham's activities, but he learns of this (after torturing Squabbles to death) and has Lucas brutally beaten. Connors asks Dr. Noah Burstein, a scientist conducting illegal experimental procedures on the inmates in exchange for reduced sentences, to try and save Lucas with a procedure that causes rapid healing. Rackham sabotages the experiment, and the resulting accident gives Lucas his abilities. He escapes and meets up with Connors, starting a new life with her under the name "Luke Cage". In the present, Cage pulls himself and his landlady out of the rubble, and reveals his abilities and name to the media.
5	5	"Just to Get a Rep"	Marc Jobst	Jason Horwitch	September 30, 2016
Claire Temple arrives in Harlem to visit her mother, Soledad Temple, in whom she confides about past experiences giving medical aid to enhanced people including Cage. Stokes begins extorting the citizens of Harlem to cover his debts, blaming Cage in an effort to turn the neighborhood against him. Cage fights back, helping defend the citizens and return their property. Cage confronts Stokes to demand that he stop this, and Shades recognizes him as Carl Lucas. Shades reveals to Stokes a new type of weapon, the Judas bullet, built from alien metal and based on a prototype stolen from Hammer Industries, that could kill Cage. With Stokes unable to afford it, Diamondback will use it to kill Cage himself in exchange for control of Harlem. Stokes instead decides to steal the weapons from the failed deal with Colon and sell them to get the money to buy the Judas bullets. Scarfe takes the weapons from police evidence, but does not deliver them to Stokes. By then, Knight is informed by NYPD Captain Betty Audrey that Scarfe is under investigation. Jidenna performs his single "Long Live the Chief" for a soundcheck at Harlem's Paradise, ahead of the release of his debut album of the same name.
6	6	"Suckas Need Bodyguards"	Sam Miller	Nathan Louis Jackson	September 30, 2016
Scarfe attempts to blackmail Stokes, but is critically shot by him and forced to escape to Pop's barbershop. Cage and Fish are out for breakfast at Soledad's restaurant, discussing the future of the barbershop, where Temple meets up with Cage. The pair discuss his abilities as they walk to the barbershop, where they find Scarfe. Temple treats his injuries. Knight is teamed with Lieutenant Perez, who is also on Stokes' payroll and ordered to kill Scarfe. Knight deduces this, and tricks Perez into implicating himself before arresting him. Cage retrieves an incriminating ledger from Scarfe's apartment, but Knight sees him and he, Temple, and Scarfe go on the run. They are on their way to 1 Police Plaza to turn over Scarfe and the evidence when they are ambushed by mercenaries working for Stokes. Cage fends them off, but Scarfe dies from his injuries. Stokes is arrested based on Scarfe's evidence, with Dillard informed of this by a reporter who has just exposed her possible involvement in Stokes' criminal activities during a live television broadcast.
7	7	"Manifest"	Andy Goddard	Akela Cooper	September 30, 2016
Scarfe's ledger is found inadmissible and Stokes is exonerated. He threatens to expose Cage's real identity and have him sent back to prison, and Cage decides to leave Harlem. Temple convinces him to stay and fight. Stokes reminisces about growing up with Dillard and their grandmother, mobster Mama Mabel. Stokes' musical talents were encouraged by his uncle Pete, whom Mabel later forced Stokes to kill after learning Pete had made side dealings with her rivals and had molested Dillard. Audrey stands down following the corruption at her precinct, and is replaced with Inspector Priscilla Ridley. After talking with Ridley, Knight begins to question Cage when he returns the stolen weapons (after taking them from Colon). Dillard is forced to resign from the council, leading to an argument with Stokes in which he insinuates that she liked being abused by Pete. Dillard kills Stokes, and Shades helps her frame Cage for the murder. Cage tells Temple about his past, just as he is shot by Diamondback—who knows him as "Carl"—with a Judas bullet. d-Nice appears again as the resident DJ at Harlem's Paradise.
8	8	"Blowin' Up the Spot"	Magnus Martens	Aïda Mashaka Croal	September 30, 2016
Temple gets Cage into an ambulance, but they are attacked by Diamondback en route to the hospital. They take refuge in a women's clinic, where Temple examines Cage and realizes that they cannot get the Judas bullet shrapnel out of him due to his generally impenetrable skin. Candace Miller, a waitress and hostess at Stokes' club, tells the police that it was Cage who killed Stokes, making Knight suspicious of Dillard. Knight calls Cage and informs him of the accusation, while another officer triangulates his location. She arrives at the clinic, attempting to arrest him, but they are attacked by Diamondback again. Cage recognizes him as his childhood friend Willis Stryker, who now blames Cage for leaving him to "rot", before escaping. Dillard secretly pays Miller for testifying against Cage. In custody, Temple insists that Cage is innocent, angering Knight to the point that she brutally assaults Temple. Ridley intervenes and has Temple released. Stryker confronts Cage on a sidestreet, revealing that they are brothers and shooting Cage with another Judas bullet.
9	9	"DWYCK"	Tom Shankland	Christian Taylor	September 30, 2016
Ridley takes away Knight's badge, and only allows her to return to duty after a session with a psychologist. Knight admits that she is struggling with her lack of control. An injured Cage limps through a predominantly white neighborhood, and is confronted by police officers. When they recognize him, he defends himself and runs, with dashcam footage of him using his abilities against one of the officers leaking onto the internet. Dillard organizes a meeting with the other local crime bosses, hoping to sell Stokes' criminal resources and legitimize her family name. They are interrupted by Stryker, who kills all the bosses but Dillard and Colon. In an attempt to save herself, Dillard shows the dashcam footage to Stryker and convinces him to sell Judas bullets to the police as a means of defending themselves from Cage. Temple convinces Cage to get Burstein's help, and they find the doctor living in hiding. He places Cage in acid that should soften his skin and allow them to remove the shrapnel, but the pain of the procedure causes Cage to go into cardiac arrest. The Delfonics perform "Stop and Look (And You Have Found Love)" in the episode.
10	10	"Take It Personal"	Stephen Surjik	Jason Horwitch	September 30, 2016
Temple and Burstein manage to revive Cage and take out the shrapnel. He and Temple look through the files on him and learn that Connors had known about Rackham's fights, and was assessing Cage with the intention of putting him through Burstein's procedure as a test subject. Cage threatens Burstein to never replicate the accident, and takes all the data with him. Burstein secretly has a copy of the files. Temple and Cage go to his home in Savannah, Georgia, where his memories of his father confirm that Stryker is telling the truth. Stryker meanwhile kills a policeman, and frames Cage. Angered, other police officers become more aggressive in their search for Cage, with one beating a teenage boy. Dillard holds a rally to support the boy, where she blames Cage for the behavior and promotes arming the police against him. Her political rival Damon Boone tells her that he knows the truth. Cage and Temple arrive at Harlem's Paradise at the same time as Knight, who attempts to arrest Stryker. He shoots Knight, and they are surrounded by mercenaries.
11	11	"Now You're Mine"	George Tillman Jr.	Christian Taylor	September 30, 2016
Cage escapes to the kitchen with Knight while Stryker takes Temple, Miller, and the remaining civilians hostage. The police surround the club, joined by district attorney Blake Tower. Cage and Knight escape to the basement using a secret entrance in the kitchen just before Stryker's men storm in. He tells her everything that he has been hiding from her. Temple tends to Miller's wound, with the latter revealing the truth about Dillard paying her off and telling her about the secret entrance. Temple escapes and joins Cage and Knight, tending to the latter's wound. Stryker, talking about being the spurned, bastard son of a preacher, threatens to kill the hostages unless Cage meets with him. Alvarez finds the secret entrance and confronts Knight and Temple, who manage to overpower him. Stryker kills Boone and uses Miller as cover to escape as Cage arrives and frees the other hostages. A SWAT team storms in and forces Cage to surrender using the Judas bullets provided by Dillard. Cage, Alvarez, and the mercenaries are placed in custody.
12	12	"Soliloquy of Chaos"	Phil Abraham	Akela Cooper & Charles Murray	September 30, 2016
Cage escapes from police custody, while Knight works to locate Stryker and clear Luke's name. Stryker has Alvarez released on bail, then orders Zip and his thugs to kill him, but Alvarez prevails and kills them. On the run, Cage continues to do what he can to help the people of Harlem as he searches for Stryker, and the public begins to support him again, though the police are still determined to bring him down. Miller meets Knight and says that she will testify against Dillard if Knight protects her. Knight takes her to Soledad's. Alvarez approaches Dillard and suggests they get Cage on their side by giving him the evidence he needs to clear his name, and then use him to defeat Stryker (with the hope that they kill each other). Cage finds Barrett, who gives up Stryker's location, but Cage goes there to find the bodies of Colon and his men. As the parties converge on Pop's to parley, Stryker appears wearing a powered suit which allows him to match Cage's strength and invulnerability. Cage tasks Knight to go after Dillard and Alvarez while he engages Stryker. Method Man guest stars in the episode, performing the original rap song "Bulletproof Love" after he is saved by Cage during a robbery.
13	13	"You Know My Steez"	Clark Johnson	Aïda Mashaka Croal & Cheo Hodari Coker	September 30, 2016
In flashbacks, Stryker helps Lucas become a boxer, eventually leading to the latter winning an important match. In the present, Cage and Stryker continue their fight inside and outside the barber shop. In the confusion, Knight drops her phone and Dillard loses the files which prove Cage's innocence. Cage tries to reason with Stryker, but eventually knocks him out when the suit's power system fails. Dillard is arrested, after publicly outing Cage as Lucas. Alvarez uses Knight's phone to lure Miller out of hiding and kills her, without whose testimony Dillard walks free. Ridley blames Knight for keeping Miller at a private place instead of protective custody. Federal marshals arrest Cage for his escape from Seagate. Temple kisses him before he leaves, and promises to call a good lawyer that she knows. Fish finds the files to clear Cage's name in the barbershop. Dillard re-opens Harlem's Paradise with Alvarez by her side, and Knight watching them. Temple considers taking up self-defense lessons. A hospitalized Stryker is visited by Burstein. Sharon Jones & the Dap-Kings perform "100 Days, 100 Nights", the title track of their "breakout effort", during Dillard's re-opening of Harlem's Paradise.

== Cast and characters ==
=== Main ===
- Mike Colter as Luke Cage
- Mahershala Ali as Cornell "Cottonmouth" Stokes
- Simone Missick as Misty Knight
- Theo Rossi as Hernan "Shades" Alvarez
- Erik LaRay Harvey as Willis Stryker / Diamondback
- Rosario Dawson as Claire Temple
- Alfre Woodard as Mariah Dillard

=== Recurring ===
- Frank Whaley as Rafael Scarfe
- Ron Cephas Jones as Bobby Fish
- Jacob Vargas as Domingo Colon
- Darius Kaleb as Lonnie Wilson
- Jade Wu as Connie Lin
- Deborah Ayorinde as Candace Miller
- Justin Swain as Mark Bailey
- Jaiden Kaine as Zip
- Sean Ringgold as Sugar
- Dawn-Lyen Gardner as Megan McLaren
- Jeremiah Richard Craft as D. W. Griffith
- Michael Kostroff as Noah Burstein
- Tijuana Ricks as Thembi Wallace
- John Clarence Stewart as Alex Wesley
- Karen Pittman as Priscilla Ridley

=== Notable guests ===
- Parisa Fitz-Henley as Reva Connors
- Rob Morgan as Turk Barrett
- Rachael Taylor as the voice of Trish Walker
- Danny Johnson as Benjamin Donovan
- Stephen Rider as Blake Tower

== Production ==
=== Development ===
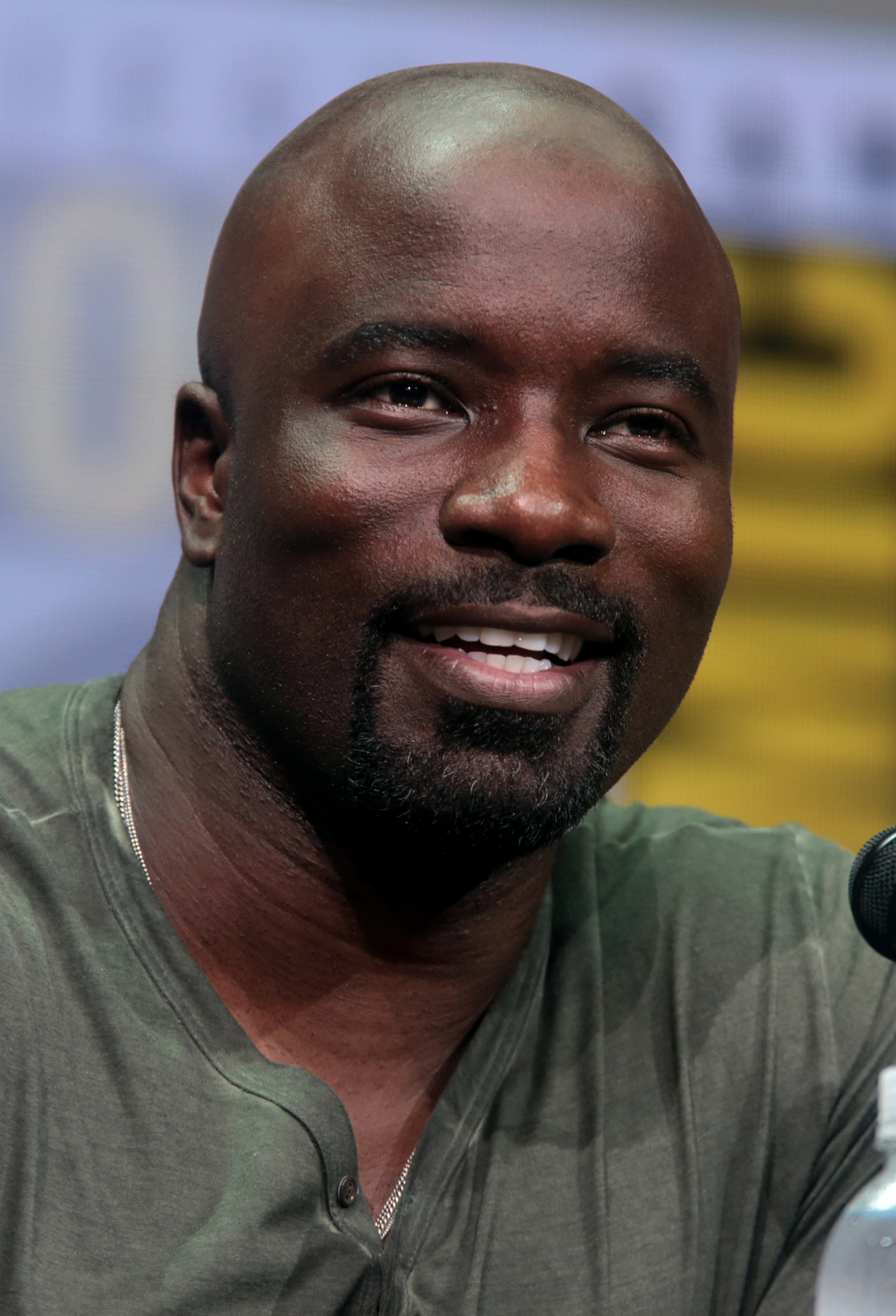
Mike Colter stars as Luke Cage, after first doing so in Jessica Jones.

In October 2013, Marvel and Disney announced that Marvel Television and ABC Studios would provide Netflix with live action series centered around Daredevil, Jessica Jones, Iron Fist, and Luke Cage, leading up to a miniseries based on the Defenders. In December 2014, Mike Colter was cast as Cage, which was envisioned as a recurring role in the first season of Marvel's Netflix television series Jessica Jones (2015) before headlining his own series. Netflix and Marvel announced that Cheo Hodari Coker would be the showrunner for Marvel's Luke Cage in late March 2015, after he pitched the series to Netflix as an examination of Harlem, "like what The Wire did for Baltimore." The season consists of 13 hour-long episodes.

=== Writing ===
Each episode of the season is named after a Gang Starr song, with Coker wanting the full season to feel like an album of music, explaining, "When Prince put out an album, you would shut things out and listen to the whole thing" similarly to modern binge-watching of television series. Coker was inspired to name the episodes based on music by television producer Shonda Rhimes, who names each episode of Grey's Anatomy after a pop song. Coker chose the Gang Starr songs ahead of his first pitch meeting with Marvel Television head Jeph Loeb, to help organize his planned story arcs. He chose the songs based on their titles only, so each episode's events does not necessarily reflect the respective song's lyrics.

Loeb described the season as "a fugitive story", and "a story of redemption", and said it was about Luke Cage's "story and where he came from and, most importantly, where he's going" after telling an "early part of the middle" of his story on Jessica Jones. Colter noted that the series uses flashbacks to tell elements of the story like the previous Marvel Netflix shows. Coker described the series as "a powerful fusion of dark drama, hip-hop, and classic superhero action" and The Wire of Marvel Television. More specifically, Coker felt the season was a hip-hop Western, comparing it to Sergio Leone's Dollars Trilogy of films, with Cage the Man with No Name coming to a town, Harlem, where he is convinced to fight injustice. Coker further compared the characters Cottonmouth and Misty Knight to the resident villain and local law enforcement, respectively, of the Western genre, and described the Harlem's Paradise nightclub as the town's saloon.

The season picks up "a few months" after Jessica Jones, with Luke Cage trying to stay off the radar. The end of the second episode "get[s] this series into forward action mode [by making Cage] see that he couldn't just sit back and do nothing." Coker said the arc for Cage in the season was "hero", and felt this was a more natural way of introducing the character than telling a traditional origin story as other Marvel properties have done. This also differentiated the show from the rest of the MCU. Coker had plotted the story of the first four episodes before the show's writers room began work, but had initially done so over two or three episodes, with the event at the end of the second episode originally taking place at the end of the first. Loeb and Marvel's Karim Zreik told Coker to slow the pace of the show down, which led to an approach that Coker compared to the film Unforgiven (1992). Coker also planned the "rugpull" at the end of the seventh episode from his initial pitch, wanting the audience to feel the same way he had reading Alpha Flight #12 which featured the death of Guardian.

Set in Harlem, rather than the Hell's Kitchen of the previous Marvel's Netflix television series, Colter described the season as "a completely different world". Marvel Comics' editor-in-chief Joe Quesada said that unlike the fictionalized version of Hell's Kitchen depicted in Daredevil and Jessica Jones, which was more inline with how it was when the comics were first written, the Harlem of Luke Cage represents the Harlem of "today", and is truer to the real-life modern New York. However, Colter admitted that the show's version of Harlem "does resemble Harlem of maybe ten years ago." Coker said that Harlem was a world for the series, but also about legacy. He wanted to replicate the experience of walking through Harlem and hearing different music coming from cars driving past and open windows, which he felt was unique to the neighborhood. Coker further described the Harlem's Paradise nightclub as the series' Iron Throne, and wanted it to "invoke the history of Harlem ... it's crime, politics, music, really the whole cornucopia of the black creative existence in one place."

Cage is seen wearing a black hoodie throughout the series, which, beyond being practical for a character trying to lie low, was a nod to Trayvon Martin and Black Lives Matter. Colter said it was meant to invoke "the idea that a black man in a hoodie isn't necessarily a threat. He might just be a hero." The series also features a political campaign with the slogan "Keep Harlem Black", "in the face of gentrification that threatens to homogenize Harlem's cultural history." Discussing these racial undertones, Coker asked, "how does the presence of a bulletproof black man change the ecosystem of a neighborhood? Not just in terms of the street-level crime. How do the cops react to someone like that? What are the ripple effects of doing that? That's one of the things I wanted to explore on the show". He did caution comparisons to recent headlines involving racial tension given when they had begun working on the show, stating that his focus had been on "identity", which he saw as a common element in all black art.

=== Casting ===
The main cast for the season includes Mike Colter as Luke Cage; Mahershala Ali as Cornell "Cottonmouth" Stokes; Simone Missick as Misty Knight; Theo Rossi as Hernan "Shades" Alvarez; Erik LaRay Harvey as Willis Stryker / Diamondback, whose involvement was not officially announced by Marvel prior to the season's release, as he agreed not to do any publicity for the show to not "ruin the twist" of Stryker being the season's main villain; Rosario Dawson as Claire Temple, reprising her role from Daredevil and Jessica Jones; and Alfre Woodard as Mariah Dillard.

In September 2015, Frank Whaley was cast as Rafael Scarfe. Sean Ringgold and Karen Pittman were revealed to be involved in the series in March 2016, playing Sugar and Priscilla Ridley, respectively. Also recurring throughout the season are Ron Cephas Jones as Bobby Fish, Jacob Vargas as Domingo Colon, Darius Kaleb as Lonnie Wilson, Jade Wu as Connie Lin, Deborah Ayorinde as Candace Miller, Justin Swain as Mark Bailey, Jaiden Kaine as Zip, Dawn-Lyen Gardner as Megan McLaren, Jeremiah Richard Craft as D. W. Griffith, Michael Kostroff as Noah Burstein, Tijuana Ricks as Thembi Wallace, and John Clarence Stewart as Alex Wesley.

Several other actors also reprise roles from other Marvel Netflix shows: Parisa Fitz-Henley returns as Cage's deceased wife Reva Connors from Jessica Jones; Rob Morgan reprises the role of Turk Barrett from Daredevil; Rachael Taylor provides the voice of Trish Walker, who she plays in Jessica Jones, for a radio talk show; and Danny Johnson and Stephen Rider reprise their roles of Benjamin Donovan and Blake Tower from the second season of Daredevil.

=== Design ===
Costume designer Stephanie Maslansky returned from the same role on Daredevil and Jessica Jones. Like the main characters of those shows, Cage has his own wardrobe evolution throughout the season after his initial look of T-shirts, jeans, leather jackets or an army jacket was introduced in Jessica Jones. The series opted to depict Cage in a Trayvon Martin-inspired hoodie, but introduces the character's classic costume for a brief flashback. Colter said that the costume, designed in the blacksploitation era, "is not made for serious moments", but the series was able to poke fun at it in the brief scene. In looking to pay homage to Cage's original costume with his updated clothing, Maslansky and Coker considered having him wear gold clothing, but thought that would be too on the nose and impractical for someone trying not to draw attention. Instead, Maslansky lined the insides of Cage's hoodies with yellow, so the color could frame the character's face in close ups. In contrast to Cage's hoodie, with jeans and T-shirts, many of the series' villains wear well-tailored suits. Stokes does this because he wants to present himself as "a wealthy, successful businessman", and wears a lot of suits from Dolce & Gabbana and Zegna. One of his suits for the show was custom made. To pay homage to the comics, Maslansky dressed Ali in a green suit for his introduction, using a subtle shade of green to avoid being flamboyant. The character subsequently is always wearing something green, like emerald earrings for one costume. The designer noted that many of these elements would not be noticed by the audience, but they made a difference to Ali when he was getting into character. For the character Shades, brands such as Hugo Boss, Helmut Lang, Prada, and Ferragamo were used "because he wasn't trying to hide who he was", while Misty Knight, in her final shot of the season, is shown wearing a version of her own iconic comic costume. That look includes leather pants and an "interesting cold-shoulder"-shaped top; a cream-colored top that fit that shape was found and dyed red for the scene.

The sets were designed and dressed to consist of strong colors that could be emphasized by the series' cinematography, to help differentiate the show from the noir look and tone of Jessica Jones. The nightclub Harlem's Paradise was intended to invoke the real-life Harlem nightclubs the Cotton Club and the Lenox Lounge, with production designer Loren Weeks, also returning from that capacity on Daredevil and Jessica Jones, taking specific inspiration from The Apollo and Smalls Paradise. Because of the series' filming schedule and Coker's desire to film live musical performances in the club, it was decided that filming in an actual nightclub would be unrealistic. A set was built for the location, with Weeks using an Art Deco style to give the club "a very distinctive look, and giving it an historical anchor", and indicate that it had been a successful club around the 1920s and 1930s and was now being refurbished as part of Stokes and Dillard's "New Harlem Renaissance". Weeks felt the building could be a metaphor for the political undercurrents of the series. Set decorator Alison Froling, whom Weeks worked with on the other Marvel Netflix series, furbished the Harlem's Paradise set with contemporary furniture, finishes, and lighting fixtures to contrast the older architectural design. The lounge side of the club features two murals by Archibald J. Motley, an artist from the original Harlem Renaissance. Coker insisted that the set for Pop's Barbershop be at street level, to connect it "both visually and geographically" with the Harlem street. For budget reasons, dressing an actual location as the barbershop was not going to work, but building a set to be at street level was also problematic since they would not be able to show people or cars driving past the window that you would see on an actual street. It was decided that a real location be found that is below street level so that scenes could be filmed on the street there, but would not have to match inside scenes filmed on the set because of the obstructed view of the street. To emphasize this, the set was built even lower than the actual store and a fake wall was added to the location. Coker instructed the series' prop master to carefully choose a selection of books to appear in Cage's bedroom, including Ralph Ellison's 1952 novel Invisible Man.

=== Filming ===
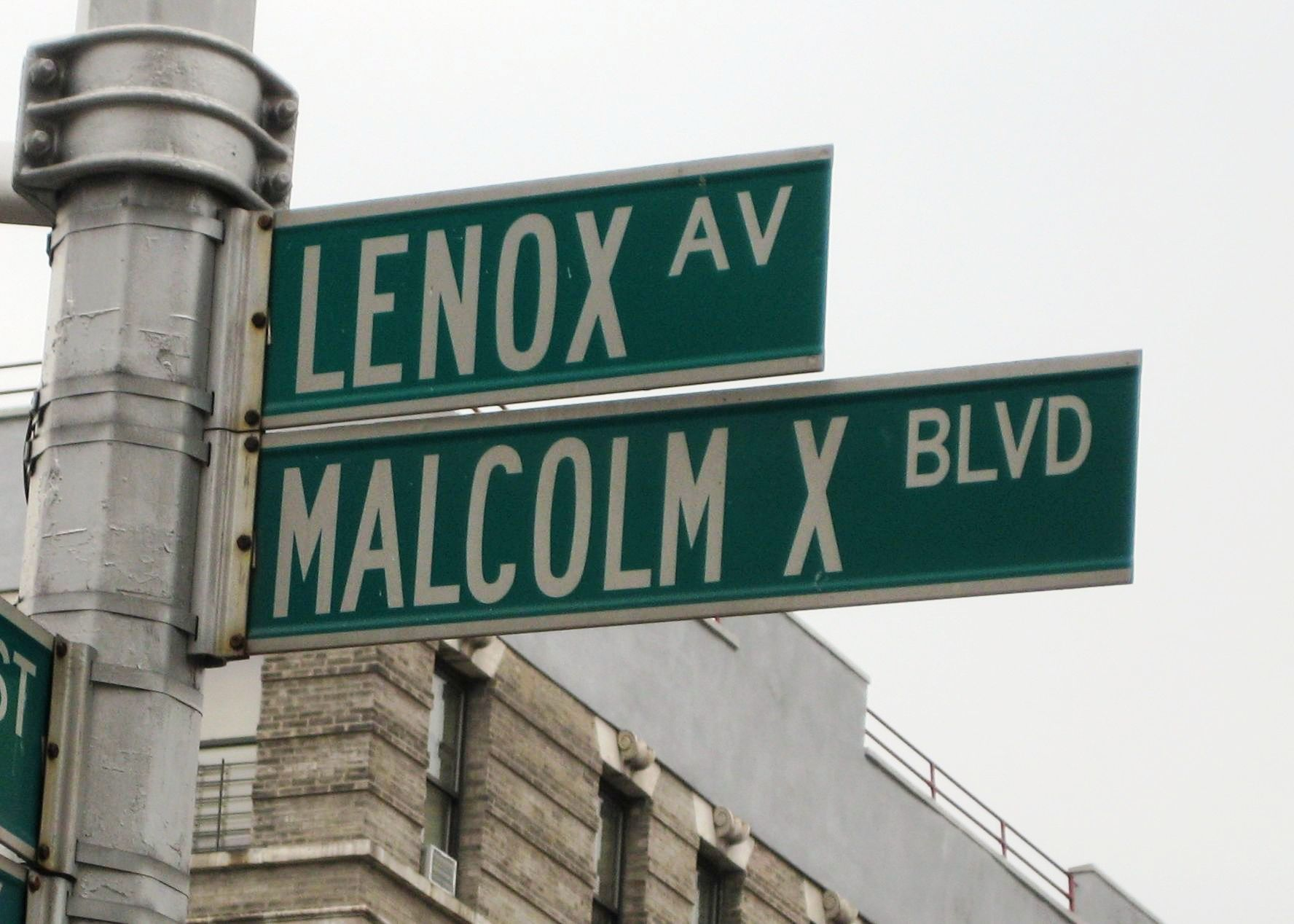
Filming took place on location in Harlem, which was important for showrunner Cheo Hodari Coker to accurately depict the neighborhood.

Marvel announced in February 2014 that the series would be filmed in New York City, with Quesada stating in April that the show would be filming on location in addition to sound stage work. In July 2015, Loeb stated that Luke Cage was prepping to begin filming, and by September 2015, production had begun under the working title Tiara. Filming concluded in March 2016.

Filming took place in Harlem, including Lenox Avenue and areas where the film American Gangster (2007) was shot, the Mount Olivet Baptist Church, St. Nicholas Park, Jackie Robinson Park, Riverside Park, and the Riverside Drive Viaduct; in Washington Heights, including at the United Palace; Cortlandt Alley in Chinatown; in areas of Queens for when Cage escapes Seagate Prison and puts on the classic Power Man costume; the Roosevelt Island steam plant and Queens Detention Facility for interiors of Seagate; the Music Hall of Williamsburg for the exterior of Harlem's Paradise; the former Fulton Correctional Facility in The Bronx for the Crispus Attucks Complex; and the Long Island City portion of Newtown Creek. It was important to Coker for the series to film in Harlem, "the only place in the city where you see those wide boulevards. We really wanted to capture the color, the rhythm of the streets". For example, the production had the opportunity to film at a barbershop in Greenwich Village, which would have been much easier for the production, but Coker said "the opportunity to film it in Harlem was irresistible. I didn't want us to talk about Harlem and then not film" there. Soundstage filming took place at Broadway Stages in Greenpoint, Brooklyn. For the church that Cage and Temple visit in Savannah, Georgia, an abandoned church in The Bronx was found that was being sold, and the production was able to "graffiti up and sort of ruin" it. They also had to spend two days carting snow from the site before filming, after a recent blizzard.

Manuel Billeter served as director of photography for the series, after doing the same for Jessica Jones. He worked with director Paul McGuigan to establish the look of the show in the first two episodes, with Coker hiring McGuigan based on his direction of the Sherlock episode "A Scandal in Belgravia" (2012). Coker was delighted to learn how little CGI McGuigan used to craft the visuals of that episode, and wanted the same approach for Luke Cage, "just old school camera stuff. He brought a very analogue perspective, analogue feel to the show." McGuigan, Coker explained, directed "every scene [as] long takes, from multiple takes over and over again. We would run an entire eight-page scene almost like a play, so when it comes together it's seamless." McGuigan was inspired by the works of photographers Gordon Parks, Tony Ray-Jones, and Jack Garofalo. Billeter looked to differentiate the look of Luke Cage from Jessica Jones, using modified gels on lights, and saturating and warming colors in color correction to give Harlem a more glowing look. Coker noted that the series' has a color scheme of yellow, brown, amber, and gold, in contrast to the violet tint Billeter gave Jessica Jones to reflect that series' villain, the Purple Man. The series was shot on Netflix's standard 4K cameras, with Billeter pairing them with Panavision Primo lenses that were "custom treated with a reflective coating in between the glass elements in the interior of the lens, causing more flares and bringing down the contrast in addition to very slightly de-focusing them" in order to "add something magic, less controlled and more cinematic". Billeter filmed Colter with a lot of low angles to make him look "even more heroic", and kept the camera close to him with Harlem in the background so that Cage "is always the dominant force in his shots, but he also remains a part of the terrain. The shots aren't of him alone; they're of him in his home."

Cage's fight style in the series was called "smack-fu" by Coker, referring to the way he tried not to punch anybody since that would probably kill them with his super strength. To film the effect of bullets bouncing off of Cage, remote controlled devices were attached to Colter and operated by somebody behind the cameras. The devices could burn his skin if not attached properly, and Colter almost lost hearing in one ear after forgetting to insert the required ear pieces. The third episode begins with a couch coming out of the window of the fictional Crispus Attucks complex in Harlem. This was a tease of a large fight scene, the series' version of the "superhero hallway fight" made famous in Daredevil. Filming for the fight was influenced by "Arnold Schwarzenegger's invading the police station in Terminator", and was one of the toughest sequences for the crew to shoot; it took a 14-hour day, and Colter attributed the successful completion of the sequence, including the couch shot, to director Guillermo Navarro. Colter also called the fourth episode particularly difficult to film, taking around 12 or 13 days to shoot. The episode was written by executive producer Charles Murray, who looked to organically transition the character's origin story from the original comics into the modern world of the series for the episode. This involved flashbacks with Colter in makeup and different costumes.

Scenes shot at the United Palace theater created new challenges for the series' stunt team due to not being able to drill holes in the historic building for creating anchors for wire rigs and other complex stunts. The crew had to find other ways to weigh down the equipment to remain safe for the actors and stunt doubles. For the explosion at the Genghis Connie's restaurant, a practical explosion was created in the storefront on location, which was extended with visual effects to show the destruction of the building. A set showing the inside of the rubble of the destroyed building was then created on a soundstage, while a lot was found that "feels" similar to the original location, where rubble could by piled and fire trucks could be brought to show the exterior. The lot was previously being used to store vehicles that had been seized as evidence, with the production having to negotiate with the NYPD to have the vehicles moved elsewhere. Looking back on the filming style of the season, and comparing it to the previous Marvel Netflix series, Weeks said that the crew members working on each of the shows wanted them all to feel like they are set in the same city, but also for the world of each character to be distinct, and for this series they embraced Harlem "for exactly what it is" to differentiate the "visual identity. Some of that is lighting, and of course, some of that is production design and location work ... the color, the life, the activity on the streets. There's so much character to the neighborhood... I think it was important to feel that these characters were rooted in the real place".

The series' production sound mixer Joshua Anderson, who worked on Daredevil and Jessica Jones as well, worked to capture as much sound on set with boom mics over lavaliers to ground the unbelievable elements of the series in "naturalistic sound". He noted that Ali's Cottonmouth laugh and many of Colter's lines in particular sounded "incredible on the boom". Anderson also talked about Luke Cage adding a new layer of sound that the other series did not—music. The captured sound had to be clear to be properly mixed in with music later, and live performances in Harlem's Paradise had to be recorded for which Anderson and his team had experience after working on the musical series Smash (2012–13).

=== Visual effects ===
FuseFX provided 867 visual effects shots for the season, with a team of 15 to 20 members under FuseFX New York's production head and senior visual effects supervisor Greg Anderson. Anderson explained that the series' challenging schedule was made easier by the company's catalog of previously used digital assets and effect elements that can be reused, or partially reused, where appropriate in new projects. Several effects shots were created to show Cage's abilities, including a slow motion shot of a thug's fist collapsing into a compound fracture while punching Cage in the face. A standout effects sequence for the season was when Stokes fires a missile at a building, which took FuseFX 130 days to complete. It involved creating a CG building and integrating it into footage of a real New York City block, matching up with different camera angles and sources of light throughout the sequence. The effects team then had to digitally destroy the building, and create "a complex array of fireballs and falling debris".

=== Music ===
In April 2016, Coker revealed that Adrian Younge and Ali Shaheed Muhammad were composing the series' score, describing it as "a confluence of multiple genres, a bit of ['90s] hip-hop, soul, psychedelic rock and classical". Younge and Muhammad composed the score as if they were creating 13 albums, one for each episode, with the music inspired by Wu-Tang Clan, Ennio Morricone, and Muhammad's group A Tribe Called Quest. The duo composed around twenty minutes of music for each episode, composing the entire season's score in nine months. Younge and Muhammad were encouraged to "push" the sound of the score as far as they could, and were allowed the use of a full, 30-piece orchestra for recording. They also arranged an original rap single, "Bulletproof Love", which features Method Man (who performs it in the show).

Songs from Mahalia Jackson, Nina Simone, John Lee Hooker ("It Serves You Right to Suffer" and "I'm Bad Like Jesse James"), Dusty Springfield ("Son of a Preacher Man"), and Wu-Tang Clan ("Bring da Ruckus") are used in the season. It also features onscreen performances by various artists as the live performances in the Harlem's Paradise nightclub, which Coker wanted to use to help capture the vibe of the neighborhood. Coker wanted Prince to perform at the nightclub for the season finale, before his death in April 2016. The "swear jar" that appears in the season was designed by Coker in hopes of convincing the artist to make the cameo appearance, as he was known to have a "swear jar" himself since he was a devout Jehovah's Witness. The role was ultimately filled by Sharon Jones & the Dap-Kings, which Coker said was "the better choice" because "that sequence is about Mariah being crowned." A soundtrack album for the season was released on October 7, digitally and pressed on yellow vinyl by Mondo.

Coker said that "one of the things that's really the cornerstone of '90s hip-hop is sampling, so we have a lot of influences that we wear openly", which he compared to the style of Quentin Tarantino. He continued, "I think what makes it feel new is the fact that we're showing you can be both. We're showing that you can do Ralph Ellison at the same times as you're doing Chester Himes." Coker was as specific with his choices of music in the season as "Martin Scorsese is with the rock 'n' roll references like in Casino or in Goodfellas", rather than just adding hip-hop music for the sake of it. He highlighted the use of "I'm Bad Like Jesse James" in the seventh episode, which he had been trying to use in something for 20 years, that "builds up and coincides with the explosion that happens on screen and it's so subtle. That's the kind of stuff I geek out over."

=== Marvel Cinematic Universe tie-ins ===
Part of the series takes place simultaneously with the events of the second season of Daredevil. Throughout the season, the villains use Hammer Industries weapons to counter Cage's abilities. Justin Hammer and his company were introduced in the film Iron Man 2 (2010), and Hammer was last seen incarcerated in Seagate Prison in the Marvel One-Shot All Hail the King (2014); Seagate is depicted in Luke Cage, as the prison where Carl Lucas was sent and where there are rumored "millionaires hidden in the basement". The series references the events of the film The Avengers (2012) and members of that team, as well as the future Defenders and their own series. Specific mentions of the latter include Madame Gao's operations in Daredevil, the widely known villains Wilson Fisk and Frank Castle, and a flier for Colleen Wing's martial arts class, to then be introduced in Iron Fist.

== Marketing ==
The first trailer for the series debuted exclusively on Netflix, autoplaying after the final episode of the second season of Daredevil. In July 2016, Colter, Woodard, Ali, Rossi, Missick, Whaley, and Coker appeared at San Diego Comic-Con to promote the series and debut footage. At the end of August, Netflix released the first part of the Street Level Hero digital web series. The series looked to "blend fiction with history by taking audiences behind the curtain on the themes that give the show its street-level authenticity and cultural relevance." The first episode, "The Music" was centered on the music of the series, with commentary from Coker, Colter, composers Younge and Muhammad, A$AP Ferg and Method Man. At the end of September, the second episode "Harlem" was released, focusing on Harlem, with commentary from Coker, Colter, A$AP Ferg, Method Man, and Harlem style icon Dapper Dan. In November the third episode "Luke" was released. On September 28, 2016, a premiere for the Luke Cage was held at the AMC Magic Johnson in Harlem.

== Release ==
=== Streaming ===
The first season of Luke Cage was released on September 30, 2016, on the streaming service Netflix worldwide, in Ultra HD 4K. The season was enhanced to be available in high dynamic range after its initial release by post-production vendor Deluxe. The 13 hour-long episodes were released simultaneously, as opposed to a serialized format, to encourage binge-watching, a format which has been successful for other Netflix series.

The season, along with the additional Luke Cage season and the other Marvel Netflix series, was removed from Netflix on March 1, 2022, due to Netflix's license for the series ending and Disney regaining the rights. The season became available on Disney+ in the United States, Canada, United Kingdom, Ireland, Australia, and New Zealand on March 16, ahead of its debut in Disney+'s other markets by the end of 2022.

=== Home media ===
The season was released on DVD in Region 2 and Blu-ray in Region B on November 27, 2017, in Region 4 on December 6, 2017, and in Region 1 and Region A on December 12, 2017. In Region A, the season featured packaging designed by Quesada, and the bonus feature "Offstage at Harlem's Paradise", a roundtable discussion with Colter, Woodard, Rossi, and Missick discussing their time during filming on the season.

== Reception ==
=== Audience viewership ===
As Netflix does not reveal subscriber viewership numbers for any of their original series, Symphony Technology Group compiled data for the season based on people using software on their phones that measures television viewing by detecting a program's sound. According to Symphony, Luke Cage opened stronger initially than the Netflix original series Making a Murderer and Stranger Things, but its performance over its first month fell short of both, comparatively. Symphony estimated that 6.34% of viewers age 18–49 were watching Luke Cage in an average minute in the first 32 days following its release, with Making a Murderer and Stranger Things seeing 9.1% and 9.81% of viewers, respectively. Symphony also estimated that 3.388 million viewers age 18–49 were watching an episode of Luke Cage over the average minute in its first weekend of release. The marketing analytics firm Jumpshot determined the season was the fourth-most viewed Netflix season in the first 30 days after it premiered, garnering 27% of the viewers that the second season of Daredevil received, which was the most viewed season according to Jumpstart. Jumpshot, which "analyzes click-stream data from an online panel of more than 100 million consumers", looked at the viewing behavior and activity of the company's U.S. members, factoring in the relative number of U.S. Netflix viewers who watched at least one episode of the season.

=== Critical response ===
The review aggregator website Rotten Tomatoes reported a 90% approval rating with an average rating of 8.00/10 based on 72 reviews. The website's critical consensus reads, "An immersive, socially conscious narrative and a confident, charismatic lead performance make Marvel's Luke Cage a stellar sampling of the new Marvel/Netflix universe." Metacritic, which uses a weighted average, assigned a score of 79 out of 100 based on 30 critics, indicating "generally favorable" reviews.

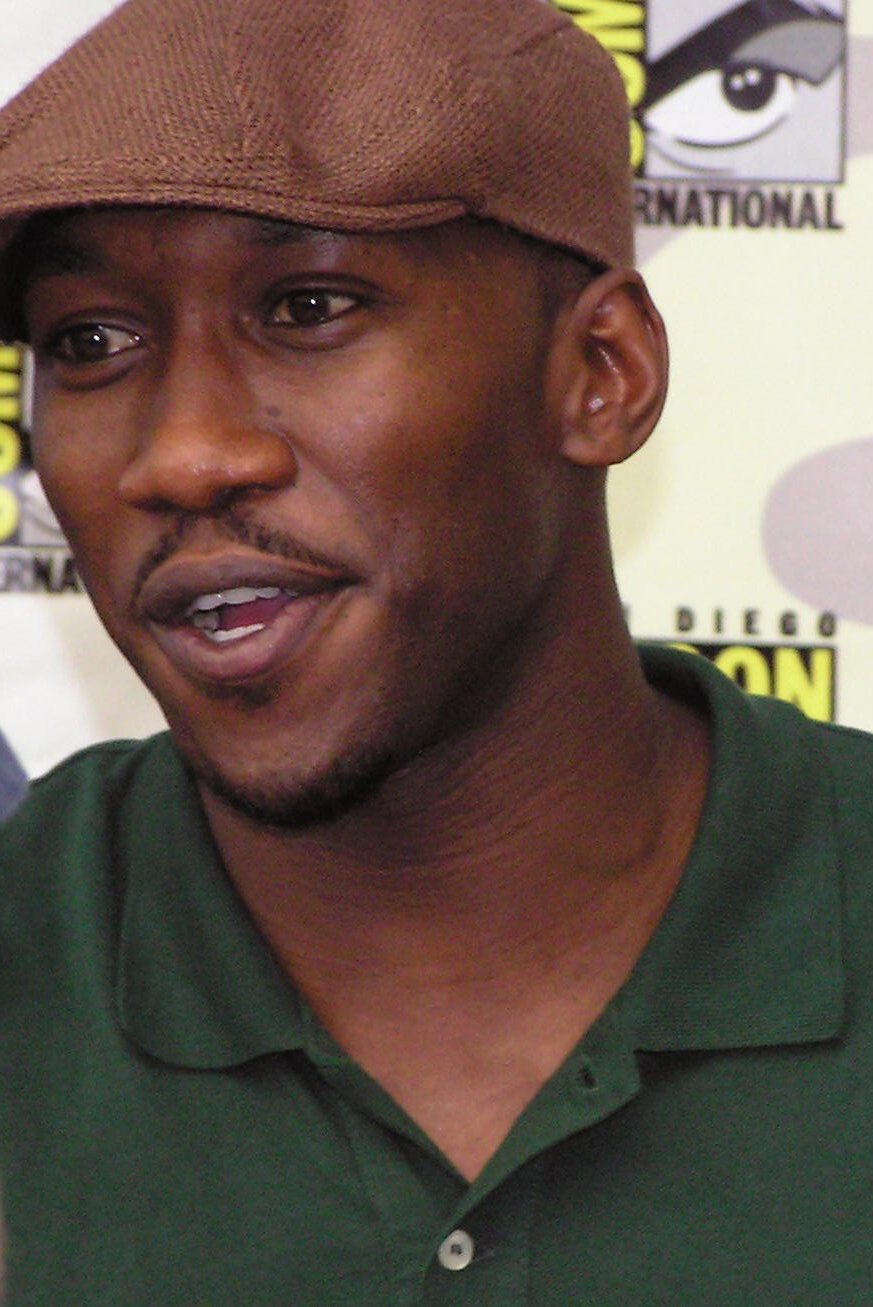
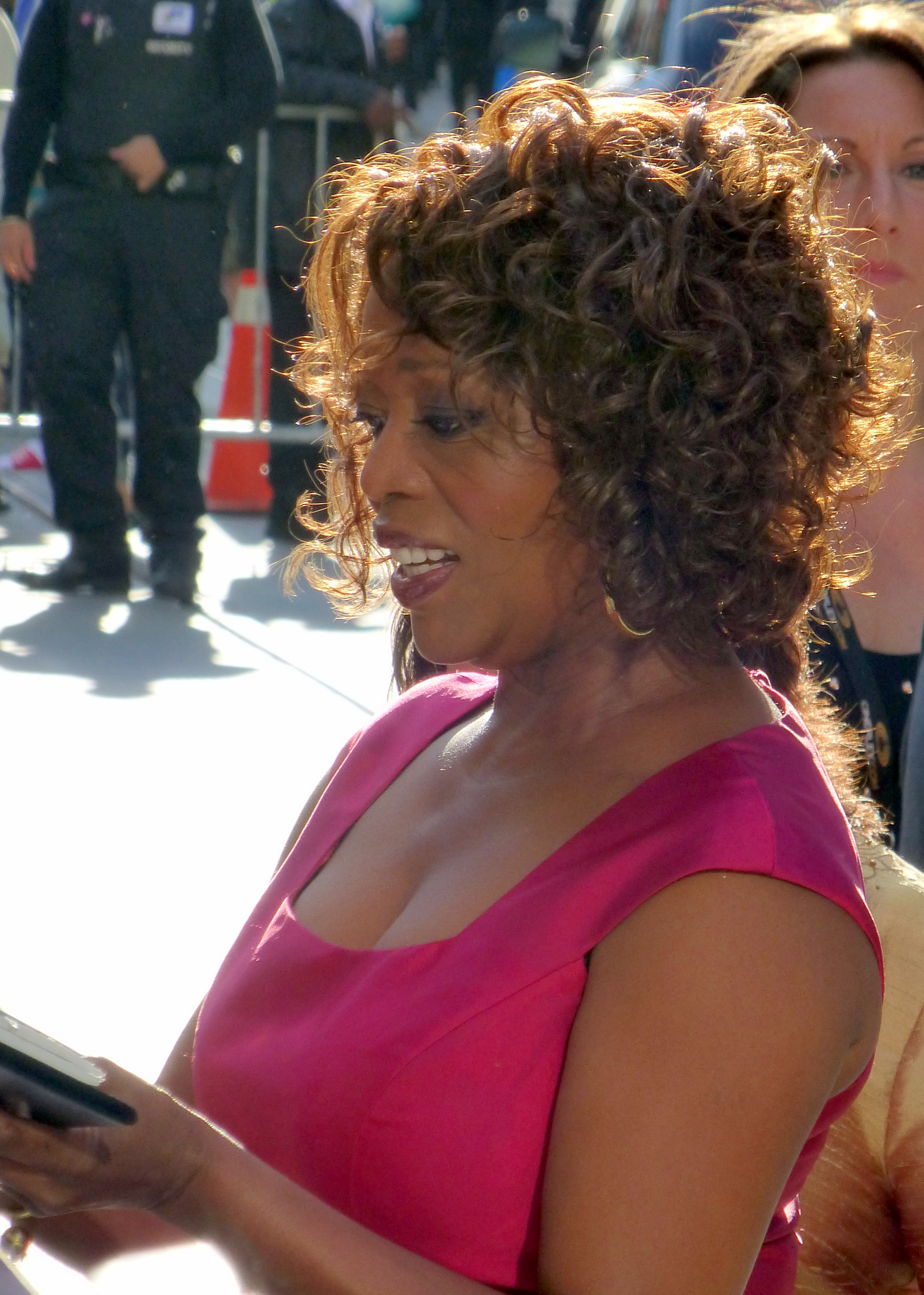
The performances of Mahershala Ali and Alfre Woodard during the season were among those praised by critics.

Reviewing the first seven episodes of the season, Allison Keene of Collider awarded it 5 stars out of 5, describing the episodes as an "intimate" portrait of the Harlem culture, and noting that each character had distinct personalities and memorable moments. Keene specifically praised Colter. Mike Cecchini of Den of Geek spoke positively of the season, particularly the cast, atmosphere, and "willingness to go places that other Marvel Studios productions can't." He found Simone Missick to be the standout performer, praised the soundtrack which has "the most active role in a superhero production since Guardians of the Galaxy", and was equally impressed with the original score by Younge and Muhammad. However, Cecchini felt the season repeated some issues from previous Marvel Netflix series, such as the use of archetypes and monologues.

Deadline Hollywood's Dominic Patten called Luke Cage "one of the most socially relevant and smartest shows on the small screen you will see this year... the series reaches both back and forward into the culture of heroes and an America looking for a true game-changer." David Milner for Digital Spy was also positive about the season's exploration of African-American history, but felt Ali's Cottonmouth did not reach the heights of previous Marvel Netflix villains. Maureen Ryan of Variety felt the season "has a more than adequate supply of pleasures", with a strong cast that could overcome some of its issues including a "somewhat clunky pilot and a notable tendency to sprawl". Merrill Barr, writing for Forbes, called the season "another winner for Marvel and Netflix that shouldn't be missed," praising its story, twists, and "the 70s stylings that shake things up real well."

Giving the season 4.5 stars out of 5, CinemaBlend's Eric Eisenberg felt Luke Cage "has a unique flavor that could very well lead it to being called the best Netflix/Marvel series so far by the time its first season is over", a sentiment also shared by Helen O'Hara of The Daily Telegraph. Eisenberg also praised the members of the supporting cast, including Missick, Whaley, Frankie Faison as Pop, and Rossi, as well as Ali and Woodard as the main villains. Despite "weak exposition delivery in the pilot, repetitive narrative structures, and individual arcs that are cut short too soon," Eisenberg concluded that Luke Cage presented an area of the MCU unlike any previous films or television series and had done so with "a compelling vision and atmosphere". David Betancourt, for The Washington Post, concluded that Luke Cage is "Netflix's best Marvel show to date. When given the chance to bring to life one of the most well-known heroes of color around, Marvel and Netflix produced something that is undeniably and unapologetically black and beautiful." TV Guide's Alexander Zalban called the season one of 2016's "most vital, important" and "timely" television series, saying it had "incredibly layered and iconic performances" from the cast.

Matt Webb Mitovich of TVLine, who gave the season a "B", felt Harlem was "a wonderfully utilized character" in the season and a welcome change from the Hell's Kitchen setting of the previous Marvel Netflix shows. He also praised the strong performances from Colter (bringing "a needed intensity") and Ali ("compelling and threatening"), but felt some of its "talkier moments" and pacing were issues. Entertainment Weekly's Jeff Jensen awarded the season a "B−", calling it a "meaningful attempt at developing a new-model black hero. As entertaining drama, it's trapped in a not-so-Marvelous trapped cage". He criticized the season as "one more piece of Marvel pop that expresses its ballyhooed shared-world premise so poorly, it's jarring when it even happens," and also took issue with elements of the season's logic, pacing, and "thinly stretched plot". Reviewing the entire season, Terri Schwartz of IGN awarded it an 8.4 out of 10, saying, "Marvel's Luke Cage doesn't reach the heights of Daredevil and Jessica Jones, and its flawed second half ends up diminishing what was otherwise a fantastic season. But with something important to say and interesting new characters, Luke Cage is another win for Marvel's Netflix shows."

=== Analysis ===
Keene highlighted the use of race in the season, and how it did not just study crime but also "the beleaguered police, sleazy politicians, and the young people in the community who see guns and drugs as an easy way to make money." Zalban felt that, just like Jessica Jones "sucked fans in by being a superhero detective story set in the Marvel Universe, while actually being one of the most powerful and thorough explorations of sexual assault ever committed to film," so too would Luke Cage with the racial aspects it covered.

Lorraine Ali at the Los Angeles Times praised the season for giving an alternative perspective on "black America" to that provided by Donald Trump, depicting a "nuanced black and Latino community of professionals and working class people, trees and cityscapes, complex conversations and shorthand street slang." Ali felt that Cage's focus on teaching others about the culture of Harlem rather than always using his abilities made him one of the more interesting and relevant modern superheroes, but also noted that he could be old-fashioned in his earnestness at times, such as in his sensitivity towards the use of the word "nigger". Writing for Study Breaks, Aliyah Thomas found some of the season's symbolism to be "hackneyed", but still felt it was "one of the most promising narratives I have yet to come across on the black experience" and "unapologetically black". Thomas highlighted the humanity of Cage, as well as the use of music to evoke the blaxploitation era of films in which the comics were originally written which she felt accurately encompassed both the culture of Harlem and the exploitation that Cage and other black Americans have endured in the past.

Commenting on the overall response to the season for ScreenPrism, Elyce Rae Helford claimed that the season is "both progressive and regressive in its race politics", with Coker actively trying to avoid the stereotypes of the blaxploitation era by featuring an anti-gun hero, strong black female characters, and other characters from a wide range of backgrounds and experiences. However, the season was unable to completely avoid this because it also embraces music that was made famous to general audiences through blaxploitation films, and because it features a significant amount of crime and violence. Helford found a generally positive response to the show's use of the word "nigger" and Cage's dislike of it, but also detailed criticisms that some had regarding Cage's conservative personality and the fact that his political ideologies did not make him a true representation of past civil rights leaders as some may have expected. For The Daily Fandom, Rachel A. questioned why Cage was the right character to be the first black headliner of an MCU project, finding contrasting interpretations of his abilities: Cage could represent the fantasy of African-Americans "who face the very real prospect of that harm, and find escapism in imagining a state of immunity from it"; or he could represent the stereotype of African-Americans having "a body that can endure endless abuse and exploitation and still produce economic value". She also felt that Cage's apparent inability to be killed absolved Marvel from certain political issues, saying white audiences did not have to question whether Cage's life "mattered", as in "Black Lives Matter", because they would know that he is safe from harm.

Tomi Obaro specifically highlighted the season's women of color for BuzzFeed, finding the season to be a rare example of nuanced women of color who were not the main character. Obaro gave especial praise to the complex depictions of Dillard, Knight, and Temple, but noted that even the minor female characters were given exposition to add depth to their portrayals, and found many of these characters to be even more interesting than Cage and the other leading men of the season, feeling that Cage was boring and most of the male characters fit into simple archetypes. Veronica Hillsbring of Essence and Charles Pulliam-Moore of Splinter News agreed, with the latter calling the season's portrayal of women its "real strength" and praising it for "expanding the scope" of the MCU to include black women as both major heroes and villains. In response to these comments, Coker said, "Black women are the most passionate commentators, and even as black female geeks and nerds, they are rarely acknowledged. So this show is kind of a love letter to them." Contrasting some of these opinions, Noah Berlatsky of Quartz discussed some of the complexities of the male characters in the season, and how it questions the "toxic black male stereotypes" of masculinity and criminality, using the examples of Cage's intelligence and vulnerability, Pop's philosophy of peace and deescalation, and Stokes' love of music and unwillingness to become a criminal. However, Berlatsky felt the season failed to follow through with these questions, as "from the moment [Pop] first appears on screen, it's clear the ideology he represents is going to be discarded. Luke Cage recognizes young Cornell's gentleness and vulnerability. But it still has to turn him into Cottonmouth."

=== Accolades ===
Luke Cage was included on multiple Best and Top TV Shows of 2016 lists, ranking on the African-American Film Critics Association's (5th), NPR's (6th), and Hidden Remote's (7th). It was also included on un-ranked lists from The Huffington Post, The Plain Dealer, TheWrap, and Yahoo! Comic Book Resources named "Just to Get a Rep" as the 9th best episode in 2016 among comic book-related television series. Additionally, Luke Cage was the third most trending television series search on Google for 2016, and the second highest rated in the science-fiction, fantasy and horror series category on Rotten Tomatoes for the year.

Year	Award	Category	Nominee(s)	Result	Ref.
2016	Hollywood Music in Media Awards	Main Title – TV Show / Digital Series	Ali Shaheed Muhammad and Adrian Younge	Nominated	
2017	People's Choice Awards	Favorite Premium Sci-Fi/Fantasy Series	Luke Cage	Nominated	
2017	Screen Actors Guild Awards	Outstanding Performance by a Stunt Ensemble in a Television Series	Luke Cage	Nominated	
2017	NAACP Image Awards	Outstanding Actor in a Drama Series	Mike Colter	Nominated	
2017	NAACP Image Awards	Outstanding Writing in a Dramatic Series	Akela Cooper for "Manifest"	Nominated	
2017	Golden Reel Awards	TV – Short Form Musical Score	"Soliloquy of Chaos"	Nominated	
2017	Peabody Awards	Entertainment and Children's programs	Luke Cage	Nominated	
2017	MTV Movie & TV Awards	Best Hero	Mike Colter	Nominated	
2017	MTV Movie & TV Awards	Best Fight Against the System	Luke Cage	Nominated	
2017	Golden Trailer Awards	Best Action (TV Spot/Trailer/Teaser for a series)	"Defender"	Nominated	
2017	BET Awards	Best Actor	Mahershala Ali	Won	
2017	Saturn Awards	Best New Media Television Series	Luke Cage	Won (Note: Also awarded to Stranger Things)	
2017	Saturn Awards	Best Actor on a Television Series	Mike Colter	Nominated	
2017	Black Reel TV Awards	Outstanding Drama Series	Luke Cage	Nominated	
2017	Black Reel TV Awards	Outstanding Actor, Drama Series	Mike Colter	Nominated	
2017	Black Reel TV Awards	Outstanding Supporting Actress, Drama Series	Rosario Dawson	Nominated	
2017	Black Reel TV Awards	Outstanding Directing, Drama Series	Clark Johnson for "You Know My Steez"	Nominated	
2017	Black Reel TV Awards	Outstanding Writing, Drama Series	Cheo Hodari Coker for "Moment of Truth"	Won	
2017	Black Reel TV Awards	Outstanding Guest Performer, Drama Series	Mahershala Ali	Won	
2017	Black Reel TV Awards	Outstanding Guest Performer, Drama Series	Frankie Faison	Nominated	
2017	Black Reel TV Awards	Outstanding Music (Comedy, Drama, TV Movie or Limited Series)	Adrian Younge & Ali Shaheed Muhammad (composers); Gabe Hilfer & Season Kent (music supervisors)	Nominated	
2017	Primetime Creative Arts Emmy Awards	Outstanding Stunt Coordination for a Drama Series, Limited Series, or Movie	James Lew	Won	
