= Mt. Olivet Baptist Church =

Mount Olivet Baptist Church or Mt. Olivet Baptist Church may be:

- Mt. Olivet Baptist Church (Portland, Oregon)
- Mt. Olivet Baptist Church (Harlem, New York)

== See also ==
- Mount Olive Baptist Church (disambiguation)
