= Black Reel TV Awards =

American television award

Black Reel Awards for Television
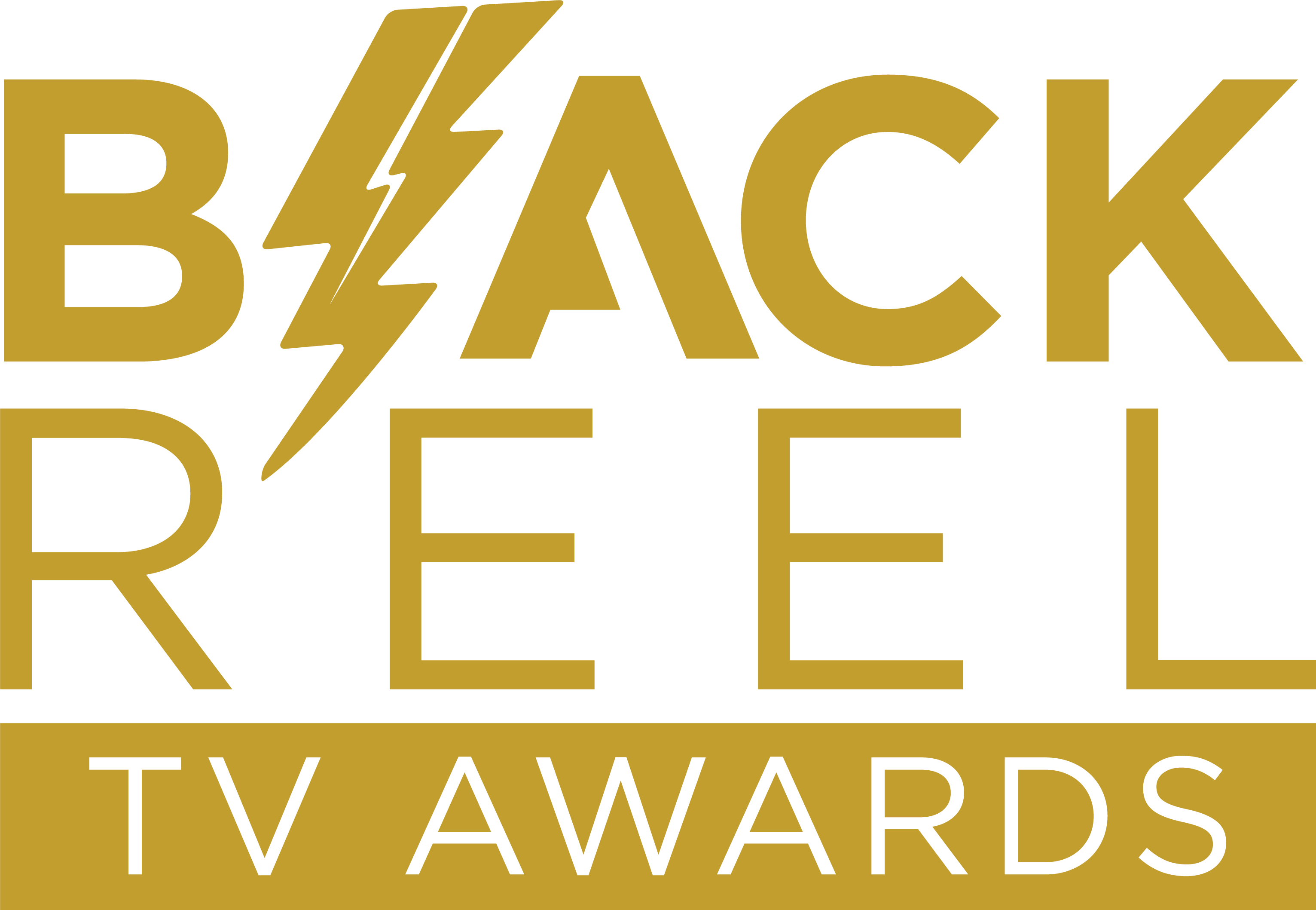
- Awarded for: Excellence in African-American Television
- Country: United States
- Presented by: Foundation for the Advancement of African-Americans in Television
- First award: June 15, 2017; 9 years ago
- Website: blackreelawards.com

The Black Reel TV Awards (TV BRA) is an annual American awards ceremony presented by the Foundation for the Augmentation of African-Americans in Film (FAAAF) to recognize artistic and technical merit of African-Americans and the African diaspora in the television industry. The winners across different categories are voted on by the FAAAF's membership and awarded a statuette called the "Black Reel Award".

The ceremony was spun-off from the Black Reel Awards through an announcement on June 5, 2017. The annual BRAs were first presented on February 16, 2000, to honor merit across both film and television. The first TV BRAs were held on August 5, 2017, as the Black Reel Awards for Television, before adopting its current name in 2021. The inaugural TV BRAs consisted of 25 categories and included categories moved over from the BRAs.

== Drama ==
- Black Reel Award for Outstanding Actor, Drama Series: since 2017
- Black Reel Award for Outstanding Actress, Drama Series: since 2017
- Black Reel Award for Outstanding Supporting Actor, Drama Series: since 2017
- Black Reel Award for Outstanding Supporting Actress, Drama Series: since 2017

== TV Movie or Limited Series ==
- Outstanding Television Movie or Limited Series: since 2000
- Outstanding Director of a Television Movie or Limited Series: since 2000
- Outstanding Actor in a Television Movie or Limited Series: since 2000
- Outstanding Actress in a Television Movie or Limited Series: since 2000
- Outstanding Supporting Actor in a Television Movie or Limited Series: since 2000
- Outstanding Supporting Actress in a Television Movie or Limited Series: since 2000
- Outstanding Screenplay of a Television Movie or Limited Series: since 2000
- Outstanding Television Documentary or Special: since 2015

== Ceremonies ==
- 2017 Awards
- 2018 Awards
- 2019 Awards
- 2020 Awards
- 2021 Awards
- 2022 Awards
- 2023 Awards
- 2024 Awards

== See also ==
- Black Reel Awards
- BET Awards
- Black Filmmakers Hall of Fame
- NAACP Image Awards
