= Black Reel Award for Outstanding Writing, Drama Series =

Annual US television award

- Awarded for: Outstanding Writing, Drama Series
- Country: United States
- Presented by: Black Reel Awards for Television
- First award: 2017; 9 years ago
- Currently held by: Jason Wilborn Paradise (2026)
- Website: blackreelawards.com

The Black Reel Award for Television for Outstanding Writing, Drama Series is an annual award given in honor of a writer or writers who produced an outstanding story or screenplay for an episode of a television drama series during the primetime network season episode of the year.

== 2010s ==
Year	Program	Episode	Nominee	Network
2017; 1st
2017; 1st	Luke Cage	"Moment of Truth"	Cheo Hodari Coker	Netflix
2017; 1st	Empire	"Toil and Trouble, Part 1"	Eric Haywood & Diane Ademu-John	FOX
2017; 1st	How to Get Away With Murder	"There Are Worse Things Than Murder"	Angela Robinson	ABC
2017; 1st	This Is Us	"The Right Thing to Do"	Aurin Squire	NBC
2017; 1st	Queen Sugar	"First Things First"	Ava DuVernay	OWN
2018 (2nd)
2018 (2nd)	This Is Us	"This Big, Amazing Beautiful Life"	Kay Oyegun	NBC
2018 (2nd)	Queen Sugar	"Dream Variations"	Ava DuVernay	OWN
2018 (2nd)	The Chi	"Pilot"	Lena Waithe	Showtime
2018 (2nd)	Queen Sugar	"Heritage"	Monica Macer & Davita Scarlett	OWN
2018 (2nd)	This Is Us	"Number Three"	Shukree Tilghman	NBC
2019; 3rd
2019; 3rd	This Is Us	"Our Little Island Girl"	Eboni Freeman	NBC
2019; 3rd	Claws	"Scream"	Maisha Closson	TNT
2019; 3rd	Pose	"Love is the Message"	Janet Mock & Ryan Murphy	FX
2019; 3rd	God Friended Me	"Unfriended"	Safia M. Dirie	CBS
2019; 3rd	This Is Us	"R&B"	Kay Oyegun	NBC

== 2020s ==
Year	Program	Episode	Nominee	Network
2020; 4th
2020; 4th	This Is Us	"A Hell of a Week: Part One"	Jon Dorsey	NBC
2020; 4th	Pose	"Never Knew Love Like This Before"	Janet Mock & Ryan Murphy	FX
2020; 4th	Queen Sugar	"Where My Body Stops or Begins"	Mike Flynn	OWN
2020; 4th	Hunters	"(Ruth 1:16)"	Zakiyyah Alexander	Amazon Prime Video
2020; 4th	Black Lightning	"The Book of Markova: Chapter Four: Grab the Strap"	Charles D. Holland & Asheleigh O. Conley	CW
2021; 5th
2021; 5th	This Is Us	"Birth Mother"	Kay Oyegun & Eboni Freeman	NBC
2021; 5th	Lovecraft Country	"Jig-a-Bobo"	Misha Green	HBO
2021; 5th	The Falcon and the Winter Soldier	"New World Order"	Malcolm Spellman	Disney+
2021; 5th	The Mandalorian	"Chapter 15: The Believer"	Ricky Famuyiwa	Disney+
2021; 5th	Snowfall	"Sleeping Dogs"	Justin Hillian	FX

== Programs with multiple awards ==
4 awards

- This Is Us

2 awards

- Paradise

== Programs with multiple nominations ==
7 nominations

- This Is Us

4 nominations

- Queen Sugar

2 nominations

- Paradise
- Pose

== Total awards by network ==
- NBC – 4
- Hulu - 2
- Netflix - 1

== Individuals with multiple awards ==
2 wins

- Eboni Freeman
- Kay Oyegun
- Jason Wilborn

== Individuals with multiple nominations ==
3 nominations

- Kay Oyegun

2 nominations

- Ava DuVernay
- Eboni Freeman
- Janet Mock
- Ryan Murphy
- Jason Wilborn
