= Luke Cage (TV series) =

2016–2018 Marvel Television series

- Genre: Action-adventure; Crime drama; Neo-blaxploitation; Neo-Western; Superhero
- Created by: Cheo Hodari Coker
- Based on: Luke Cage by: Archie Goodwin; George Tuska; Roy Thomas; John Romita
- Showrunner: Cheo Hodari Coker
- Starring: Mike Colter; Mahershala Ali; Simone Missick; Theo Rossi; Erik LaRay Harvey; Rosario Dawson; Alfre Woodard; Gabrielle Dennis; Mustafa Shakir; Jessica Henwick; Finn Jones; Stephen Rider
- Composers: Adrian Younge; Ali Shaheed Muhammad
- Country of origin: United States
- Original language: English
- No. of seasons: 2
- No. of episodes: 26

Production
- Executive producers: Charles Murray; Paul McGuigan; Cindy Holland; Allie Goss; Alison Engel; Kris Henigman; Alan Fine; Stan Lee; Joe Quesada; Dan Buckley; Jim Chory; Jeph Loeb; Cheo Hodari Coker; Karim Zreik
- Producer: Gail Barringer
- Production location: New York City
- Cinematography: Manuel Billeter; Petr Hlinomaz
- Editors: Jonathan Chibnall; Miklos Wright; Tirsa Hackshaw; Tim Mirkovich; Jon Otazua; Marie Lee
- Running time: 44–69 minutes
- Production companies: Marvel Television; ABC Studios

Original release
- Network: Netflix
- Release: September 30, 2016 – June 22, 2018

Related
- Marvel's Netflix television series

Marvel's Luke Cage is an American television series created by Cheo Hodari Coker for the streaming service Netflix, based on the Marvel Comics character Luke Cage. It is set in the Marvel Cinematic Universe (MCU), sharing continuity with the franchise's films, and was the third Marvel Netflix series leading to the crossover miniseries The Defenders (2017). The series was produced by Marvel Television in association with ABC Studios, with Coker serving as showrunner.

Mike Colter stars as Luke Cage, a former convict with superhuman strength and unbreakable skin who now fights crime and corruption. Simone Missick, Theo Rossi, Rosario Dawson, and Alfre Woodard also star, with Mahershala Ali and Erik LaRay Harvey joining them for season one, and Mustafa Shakir and Gabrielle Dennis joining for season two. Development of the series began in late 2013. Colter was cast as Cage in December 2014, to appear in the series Jessica Jones before starring in his own series. Coker was hired as showrunner in March 2015, and focused on themes of race and black culture with a neo-blaxploitation, neo-Western tone. Filming for the series, which looked to replicate the unique culture and atmosphere of Harlem, took place in New York City. It features many musical guests as well as a "'90s hip-hop" score by Adrian Younge and Ali Shaheed Muhammad.

The first season was released in its entirety on Netflix on September 30, 2016, followed by the second on June 22, 2018. They were met with positive reviews, and received numerous accolades including a Primetime Creative Arts Emmy Award. Following creative differences during the development of a third season, Netflix cancelled Luke Cage on October 19, 2018; all of the Marvel Netflix series were removed from Netflix on March 1, 2022, after Disney regained the license for them. They began streaming on Disney+ from March 16. Colter reprised his role for Marvel Studios in 2026, beginning with the second season of the Disney+ series Daredevil: Born Again.

== Premise ==
When a sabotaged experiment gives him super strength and unbreakable skin, Luke Cage becomes a fugitive attempting to rebuild his life in Harlem and must soon confront his past and fight a battle for the heart of his city. After clearing his name, Cage becomes a hero and celebrity in Harlem, only to encounter a new threat that makes him confront the line between hero and villain.

== Cast and characters ==
=== Main ===
- Mike Colter as Luke Cage:
  Former convict Carl Lucas was given superhuman strength and unbreakable skin, and now fights crime under the name Luke Cage. Colter portrayed the character differently in the series than he had previously in the first season of Jessica Jones (2015), explaining, "You're not always the same person around everyone you know ... you might not necessarily behave the same way around your mom that you would with your wife or your boss". The character uses his signature catch phrase "Sweet Christmas" from the comics in the series, but sparingly, with the character often "opting instead for pensive silence"; composer Adrian Younge said, "He's a black superhero, but he's a different type of black alpha male. He's not bombastic. You rarely see a modern black male character who is soulful and intelligent." Colter put on 30 pounds (14 kg) of muscle for the role. David Austin and Clifton Cutrary portray a young and teenage Lucas, respectively.
- Mahershala Ali as Cornell "Cottonmouth" Stokes:
  The owner of the Harlem's Paradise nightclub and the cousin of Mariah Dillard who deals in illegal operations. Ali described Stokes as "a Godfather-type villain", while Head of Marvel Television Jeph Loeb referred to him as "the other hero of the story", continuing the tradition of previous Marvel Netflix villains Wilson Fisk and Kilgrave. Showrunner Cheo Hodari Coker, a former music journalist, said that the attitude of rapper Biggie Smalls particularly influenced his version of Cottonmouth. Ali took the role knowing that Stokes would die early on in the series, saying the experience "was like shooting a film ... I found myself excited by a character's departure, because I felt like this was something I could give my all to for a period of time before saying 'peace' to him". Elijah Boothe portrays a young Stokes.
- Simone Missick as Mercedes "Misty" Knight:
  A Harlem NYPD Detective with a strong sense of justice, who is determined to learn about Cage. Missick said, "She's her own person. She's not the wife. She's not a girlfriend. She's not a sidepiece or a sidekick." Missick described Misty Knight as "a person who has a very strong moral compass who is absolutely dedicated to protecting her community", adding her proudest moment in playing the character, was the fact that she "believes in the system, even though... [with] our current times, it's difficult to believe in the system." In the series, Knight has what Missick called a "superpower" referred to as 'Misty Vision' that allows her to look at a crime scene and deduce what happened.
- Theo Rossi as Hernan "Shades" Alvarez:
  A relentless, menacing, smooth and manipulative, street smart criminal working for Diamondback with ties to Cage's past. Loeb called Shades "kind of the Littlefinger of Luke Cage", "the ultimate opportunist".
- Erik LaRay Harvey as Willis Stryker / Diamondback:
  A powerful arms dealer who is Cage's half brother and the one who framed him for the crime that sent him to Seagate Prison. Coker felt the backstory between Stryker and Cage got "twisted" because of how Jessica Jones introduced Cage's wife Reva Connors, believing the series did not get Stryker's tone right until the eleventh episode. Harvey talked about the character's illegitimacy, saying being "called a bastard his whole life... [is] what drives Willis ... He gets sent away because of his father's actions and then once he's in the jail system, he just gets tortured. After all that, his mind's been twisted and warped, and he's developed this sensitivity that's almost psychopathic." The character is always seen smiling when killing or defaming Cage's name, which is "just his way of dealing with his pain. He smiles through his pain." Jared Kemp portrays a teenage Stryker.
- Rosario Dawson as Claire Temple:
  A former nurse in Hell's Kitchen, whose friendship with Cage will affect both of their lives. Dawson reprises her role from the previous Marvel Netflix series. "Because she plays a nurse that basically seems to be in the right place at the right time, and she's very good at helping out superheroes who are in need, and I think you will see some of that in Luke Cage," said Colter. "Ultimately I think she's going to be a very good companion for Luke. I think she's someone that Luke needs in his life at this time."
- Alfre Woodard as Mariah Stokes-Dillard:
  A local councilwoman and Stokes' cousin looking to bring change to Harlem, whose life is "thrown into turmoil" by the actions of Cage and Stokes. Though Dillard is not necessarily a criminal herself, she does feel a responsibility to her family, including Stokes. Woodard, who lives in Harlem, was convinced to join the project after Coker proved his love of Harlem and its culture. The series' version of the character is significantly different from the comics' Black Mariah, but Coker wanted to pay homage to her origins by using "Black Mariah" as a nickname. It is ultimately used by Stokes as a personal insult from their past growing up together, in retaliation to Dillard verbally attacking him. Megan Miller portrays a young Dillard.
- Gabrielle Dennis as Tilda Johnson: A holistic doctor and the daughter of Mariah Dillard who cannot stay out of trouble in Harlem
- Mustafa Shakir as John McIver / Bushmaster: The leader of a Jamaican gang called the Stylers who uses folk magic to gain powers almost equal to Cage's and who obsessively pursues revenge against the Stokes family.

=== Featured ===
The following actors are credited as starring in the single episodes in which they appear in season 2:

- Jessica Henwick as Colleen Wing: A martial arts expert and bushido master who helps Misty Knight. Henwick reprises her role from other Marvel Netflix series.
- Finn Jones as Danny Rand / Iron Fist:
  A billionaire Buddhist monk, co-CEO of Rand Enterprises, and martial artist with the ability to call upon the mystical power of the Iron Fist. Colter explained that there had been interest from fans to see more of the previously established relationship between Cage and Jessica Jones, but they "went out on a limb" and decided to give to the fans of the "Heroes for Hire" instead by having Cage and Rand team up. He added that Finn Jones, who also reprises his role from other Marvel Netflix series, brings "some fresh blood" in Luke Cage.
- Stephen Rider as Blake Tower: A New York district attorney. Rider reprises his role from Daredevil.

== Episodes ==
Season	Episodes	Originally released
1	13	September 30, 2016
2	13	June 22, 2018

=== Season 1 (2016) ===
No. overall	No. in season	Title (Note: Each episode is named after a Gang Starr song, chosen based on their titles only, so each episode's events does not necessarily reflect the respective song's lyrics.)	Directed by	Written by	Original release date
1	1	"Moment of Truth"	Paul McGuigan	Cheo Hodari Coker	September 30, 2016
2	2	"Code of the Streets"	Paul McGuigan	Cheo Hodari Coker	September 30, 2016
3	3	"Who's Gonna Take the Weight?"	Guillermo Navarro	Matt Owens	September 30, 2016
4	4	"Step in the Arena"	Vincenzo Natali	Charles Murray	September 30, 2016
5	5	"Just to Get a Rep"	Marc Jobst	Jason Horwitch	September 30, 2016
6	6	"Suckas Need Bodyguards"	Sam Miller	Nathan Louis Jackson	September 30, 2016
7	7	"Manifest"	Andy Goddard	Akela Cooper	September 30, 2016
8	8	"Blowin' Up the Spot"	Magnus Martens	Aïda Mashaka Croal	September 30, 2016
9	9	"DWYCK"	Tom Shankland	Christian Taylor	September 30, 2016
10	10	"Take It Personal"	Stephen Surjik	Jason Horwitch	September 30, 2016
11	11	"Now You're Mine"	George Tillman Jr.	Christian Taylor	September 30, 2016
12	12	"Soliloquy of Chaos"	Phil Abraham	Akela Cooper & Charles Murray	September 30, 2016
13	13	"You Know My Steez"	Clark Johnson	Aïda Mashaka Croal & Cheo Hodari Coker	September 30, 2016

=== Season 2 (2018) ===
No. overall	No. in season	Title (Note: Each episode is named after a Pete Rock & CL Smooth song.)	Directed by	Written by	Original release date
14	1	"Soul Brother #1"	Lucy Liu	Cheo Hodari Coker	June 22, 2018
15	2	"Straighten It Out"	Steph Green	Akela Cooper	June 22, 2018
16	3	"Wig Out"	Marc Jobst	Matt Owens	June 22, 2018
17	4	"I Get Physical"	Salli Richardson-Whitfield	Matthew Lopes	June 22, 2018
18	5	"All Souled Out"	Kasi Lemmons	Ian Stokes	June 22, 2018
19	6	"The Basement"	Millicent Shelton	Aïda Mashaka Croal	June 22, 2018
20	7	"On and On"	Rashaad Ernesto Green	Nicole Mirante Matthews	June 22, 2018
21	8	"If It Ain't Rough, It Ain't Right"	Neema Barnette	Nathan Louis Jackson	June 22, 2018
22	9	"For Pete's Sake"	Clark Johnson	Matt Owens & Ian Stokes	June 22, 2018
23	10	"The Main Ingredient"	Andy Goddard	Akela Cooper	June 22, 2018
24	11	"The Creator"	Stephen Surjik	Nicole Mirante Matthews & Matthew Lopes	June 22, 2018
25	12	"Can't Front on Me"	Everardo Gout	Aïda Mashaka Croal	June 22, 2018
26	13	"They Reminisce Over You"	Alex García López	Cheo Hodari Coker	June 22, 2018

== Production ==
=== Development ===
In May 2013, Marvel Studios reacquired the rights to Luke Cage from Sony Pictures Entertainment and Columbia Pictures, after a feature film had been in development at Columbia since 2003, to no avail. By October 2013, Marvel Television was preparing four drama series and a miniseries, totaling 60 episodes, to present to video on demand services and cable providers, with Netflix, Amazon, and WGN America expressing interest. A few weeks later, Marvel and Disney announced that Marvel Television and ABC Studios would provide Netflix with live-action series centered around Luke Cage, Daredevil, Jessica Jones, and Iron Fist, leading up to a miniseries based on the Defenders.

Marvel began their search for a showrunner in 2014, and in late March 2015, Netflix and Marvel announced Cheo Hodari Coker in that role and revealed the title of the series to be Marvel's Luke Cage. Coker was inspired to become the series showrunner "when he realized the ramifications of a series about a black man with impenetrable skin and how that might empower him to take on both criminals and crooked authority figures"; he pitched the series to Netflix as an examination of Harlem, "like what The Wire did for Baltimore." Charles Murray, Alison Engel, Allie Goss, Kris Henigman, Cindy Holland, Alan Fine, Stan Lee, Joe Quesada, Dan Buckley, and Jim Chory also serve as executive producers. The series was originally intended to be the fourth of the announced series from Netflix, debuting after Iron Fist, but it was fast-tracked to be the third series, after Cage was introduced in Jessica Jones and became a breakout star, with Marvel wanting to "follow the momentum". Coker had also created a draft that became the bible for the series that contributed to Marvel switching the series' order with Iron Fist. In December 2016, Netflix renewed the series for a second season.

=== Writing ===
Charles Murray, Akela Cooper, Nathan Louis Jackson, Matt Owens, Aïda Mashaka Croal, Jason Horwitch, and Christian Taylor served as writers on the first season, with Matthew Lopes, Nicole Mirante-Matthews, and Ian Stokes joining for the second. Coker noted that the majority of the series' writers were Black and "majority geek", one of the first such writing teams, which was "a rarity on television". The writers also "[understood] the culture" and had a "lived experience" that gave the series "authenticity".

After signing on to the series, Coker was able to read the first two scripts of both Daredevil and Jessica Jones, giving him an idea of the quality of writing for those series, and how important the development of their villains was. Actor Mike Colter described the series as having "soul" and "intensity", compared to the "dark action" of Daredevil and the "noir feel" of Jessica Jones. Coker described "a powerful fusion of dark drama, hip-hop, and classic superhero action" while being "The Wire of Marvel television, because we really deal with a lot of different issues." Jason Tanz of Wired likened the series to neo-blaxploitation, which Coker agreed with in that "blaxploitation is [just] black characters being able to assert themselves in a visual world", stating that he felt the series was more specifically a "hip-hop Western", comparing its characters and setting to Sergio Leone's Dollars Trilogy of films (with Cage the Man with No Name, for example). Each episode title of the series is named after a song title from hip-hop duos: the first season's from Gang Starr, and the second season's from Pete Rock & CL Smooth.

When asked whether the series would feel as "adult" as Jessica Jones, Colter replied, "if you think Jessica is adult then we're still keeping up with that pace ... we'll continue along those lines of PG-16+". On whether Luke Cage would address current race issues, including Black Lives Matter, given the character's past (a wrongfully imprisoned black man), Colter said, "this is not necessarily the platform to hit it head on" but "the things that he's going through will ring true for a lot of people in law enforcement" and on the street. Loeb said on the issue, "Luke Cage, when he came on the scene in the early 70s was for all intents and purposes the first black superhero. Given what's going on present day, it just resonates." Coker stated that Cage is "someone that the community can touch and go to", adding, "There's never been a time in history where having a bulletproof black man" has been so important. Luke Cage was also the first MCU property to use the word "nigger" or "nigga", with Marvel having complete trust in Coker's use of it: the word is used casually in the series, though some characters, including Cage, prefer not to use it. Coker said the intent was never to use it "in a way where it's flippant. I used it from the standpoint of, if we were going to eavesdrop on a conversation with African American people, with nobody else around, when would this word be used and how would it get used." Coker also likened the use in the series to "the way music used to treat it," not having it be "every other word of every other chorus, because at that point, it just gets silly."

=== Casting ===
By November 2014, Lance Gross, Colter, and Cleo Anthony were in contention for the role of Luke Cage, which was envisioned as a recurring role on Jessica Jones before headlining Luke Cage. Colter was confirmed in the role the next month, as a series regular. He signed on for the two series without reading any scripts. In August 2015, Alfre Woodard, who portrays Miriam Sharpe in the MCU film Captain America: Civil War, was in talks to join the cast, and the following month she was confirmed as a series regular, portraying Mariah Dillard. Also announced as cast in September were Theo Rossi as Hernan "Shades" Alvarez, Simone Missick as Mercedes "Misty" Knight, and Mahershala Ali as Cornell "Cottonmouth" Stokes. In November, Rosario Dawson was confirmed to be reprising her role of Claire Temple from previous MCU Netflix series. In March 2016, set photos revealed Erik LaRay Harvey had been cast as Willis Stryker / Diamondback. Harvey's involvement was not officially announced by Marvel prior to the series' release, and he agreed not to do any publicity for it to not "ruin the twist" of Stryker being the series' main villain. Harvey and Ron Cephas Jones had originally been considered for Cottonmouth, until Coker decided to have the character be younger; Harvey then became Stryker, while Coker created the recurring character of Bobby Fish for Jones.

Colter, Missick, Rossi, Dawson, and Woodard returned for the second season. In July 2017, Mustafa Shakir and Gabrielle Dennis joined the cast, as John McIver / Bushmaster and Tilda Johnson, respectively.

=== Design ===
Stephanie Maslansky, the costume designer for Daredevil and Jessica Jones, serves as costume designer for Luke Cage as well. The series sees Cage have a wardrobe evolution from his initial look of T-shirts, jeans, leather jackets or an army jacket that was introduced in Jessica Jones. Maslansky took inspiration from the comics illustrations, as she did on the other Marvel Netflix series, but also looked to the "rich and colorful history" of Harlem, and Coker's own vision. In looking to pay homage to Cage's original costume with his updated clothing for the series, Maslansky and Coker considered "the idea of him wearing a gold hoodie, a gold T-shirt, but those just seemed too on the nose, and just too bright for a guy who is trying to keep his identity quiet." Instead, Maslansky lined the insides of all of Cage's hoodies with yellow, so the color could frame the character's face in close ups.

The series' title sequence, which uses yellow overtones, blends a silhouette of Luke Cage with images of Harlem. Originally, the sequence was of Cage jogging that appeared in the sixth episode in the first season with Luke Cage in "a yellow American International Pictures/'Tarantino' font".

=== Filming ===
Filming for the series takes place in New York City, significantly in Harlem, where the series is set. Coker described the neighborhood as "the only place in the city where you see those wide boulevards. We really wanted to capture the color, the rhythm of the streets". For example, the production had the opportunity to film at a barbershop in Greenwich Village "that would've been a little easier for us to shoot in", but Coker said "the opportunity to film it in Harlem was irresistible. I didn't want us to talk about Harlem and then not film in Harlem." Sound stage work also takes place in New York. Manuel Billeter serves as director of photography for the series, after doing the same for Jessica Jones.

=== Visual effects ===
Visual effects for the series were completed by FuseFX, with Greg Anderson serving as visual effects supervisor.

=== Music ===
In April 2016, Coker revealed that Adrian Younge and Ali Shaheed Muhammad were composing the series' score, describing it as "a confluence of multiple genres, a bit of ['90s] hip-hop, soul, psychedelic rock and classical", with "a lot of different musical appearances". Coker had contacted Younge and Muhammad separately, asking if they would like to work together on the series, not knowing that the pair were already working together on an album. Younge and Muhammad took inspiration from Wu-Tang Clan, Ennio Morricone, and Muhammad's group A Tribe Called Quest, with Younge saying, "we wanted to make something great. Not just for black people or minorities, just something great that just happens to be based on our culture." A soundtrack album for the first season was released on October 7, 2016, digitally and pressed on yellow vinyl by Mondo. A soundtrack for the second season was released on June 22, 2018, digitally.

=== Marvel Cinematic Universe tie-ins ===
Luke Cage is the third of the ordered Netflix series after Daredevil and Jessica Jones and was followed by Iron Fist, which lead to the miniseries The Defenders. In November 2013, Disney CEO Bob Iger stated that if the characters prove popular on Netflix, "It's quite possible that they could become feature films," which was echoed by Sarandos in July 2015. In August 2014, Vincent D'Onofrio, Wilson Fisk in Daredevil, stated that after the "series stuff with Netflix", Marvel has "a bigger plan to branch out". In March 2015, Loeb spoke on the ability for the series to crossover with the MCU films and the ABC television series, saying, "It all exists in the same universe. As it is now, in the same way that our films started out as self-contained and then by the time we got to The Avengers, it became more practical for Captain America to do a little crossover into Thor 2 and for Bruce Banner to appear at the end of Iron Man 3. We have to earn that. The audience needs to understand who all of these characters are and what the world is before you then start co-mingling in terms of where it's going."

== Marketing ==
Disney Consumer Products created a small line of products to cater to a more adult audience, given the show's edgier tone. Paul Gitter, senior VP of Marvel Licensing for Disney Consumer Products explained that the focus would be more on teens and adults than very young people, with products at outlets like Hot Topic. Additionally, a Marvel Knights merchandise program was created to support the series, which creates new opportunities for individual product lines and collector focused products. Licensing partners wanted to pair up with Marvel, despite this not being a film project, given its previous successes.

== Release ==
=== Streaming ===
Luke Cage was released on the streaming service Netflix, in all territories where it is available, in Ultra HD 4K and High-dynamic-range video (HDR). The first season was enhanced to be available in HDR after its initial release by post-production vendor Deluxe. The episodes of each season were released simultaneously, as opposed to a serialized format, to encourage binge-watching, a format which has been successful for other Netflix original series. Despite being branded as a "Netflix Original", Luke Cage was licensed to Netflix from Disney.

Luke Cage was removed from Netflix on March 1, 2022, along with the other Marvel Netflix series, due to Netflix's license for the series ending and Disney regaining the rights. Disney opted not to have Netflix pay a large licensing fee to retain the distribution rights for the series. Coker hoped Disney did not "sit on [the series] for years to allow for an easier reboot, or re-air it with a different mix, or the N-Word muted". The series will be made available on Disney+ on March 16 in the United States, Canada, United Kingdom, Ireland, Australia, and New Zealand, and in Disney+'s other markets by the end of 2022. In the United States, revised parental controls were introduced to the service to allow the more mature content of the series to be added, similarly to the controls that already exist for other regions that have the Star content hub. The series' tribute to Reg E. Cathey in the second season was removed on Disney+.

=== Home media ===
Season	DVD release dates			Blu-ray release dates	
Season	Region 1	Region 2	Region 4	Region A	Region B
1	—N/a	November 27, 2017	December 12, 2017	November 27, 2017	November 27, 2017
2	TBA	TBA	TBA	TBA	TBA

== Reception ==
=== Audience viewership ===
As Netflix does not reveal subscriber viewership numbers for any of their original series, Karim Zreik, senior vice president of original programming at Marvel Television, provided some viewership demographics for Luke Cage in August 2017, noting that the series has attracted "sort of a mix" of viewers between gender and age. Also in the month, Netflix released viewing patterns for the Marvel Netflix series. The data, which came from Netflix's "1,300 'taste communities' around the world, where subscribers are grouped based on what they watch", showed that viewers would not watch the series in chronological order by release, rather starting with Jessica Jones, then Daredevil, Luke Cage and finally Iron Fist. Todd Yellin, Netflix's vice president of product innovation, noted that audiences watch the series "in order of how they're interested in them and how they learn about them." Netflix's data also showed that a viewer watching Luke Cage would most often then move on to Iron Fist, with Yellin figuring that Jessica Jones and Luke Cage would have paired up more, given that Cage was introduced on Jessica Jones. The data also revealed that fans of Stranger Things and other series that explore "the dark side of society" such as Black Mirror, The Walking Dead and the documentary Amanda Knox led viewers to starting Luke Cage. In October 2018, Crimson Hexagon, a consumer insights company, released data that examined the "social-media buzz" for the series to try to correlate it with potential viewership. The data showed that when the first season premiered in September 2016, the season had over 300,000 Twitter and Instagram posts regarding it, and when the second season was released in June 2018, the posts had declined dramatically to under 50,000.

=== Critical response ===
Critical response of Luke Cage
Season	Rotten Tomatoes	Metacritic
1	90% (72 reviews)	79 (30 reviews)
2	86% (63 reviews)	64 (13 reviews)

The review aggregation website Rotten Tomatoes reported a 90% approval rating with an average rating of 8/10 based on 72 reviews. The website's critical consensus reads, "An immersive, socially conscious narrative and a confident, charismatic lead performance make Marvel's Luke Cage a stellar sampling of the new Marvel/Netflix universe." Metacritic, which uses a weighted average, assigned a score of 79 out of 100 based on 30 critics, indicating "generally favorable reviews".

The second season has an approval rating of 86% with an average rating of 7.2/10 based on 63 reviews. The website's critical consensus states, "In its second season, Marvel's Luke Cage delivers a satisfyingly complex narrative and a solid ensemble cast led by Alfre Woodard's standout performance as the archvillainess Black Mariah." On Metacritic, it has a score of 64 out of 100 based on 13 critics, indicating "generally favorable reviews".

=== Accolades ===
Year	Award	Category	Nominee(s)	Result	Ref.
2016	Hollywood Music in Media Awards	Main Title – TV Show / Digital Series	Ali Shaheed Muhammad and Adrian Younge	Nominated	
2017	People's Choice Awards	Favorite Premium Sci-Fi/Fantasy Series	Luke Cage	Nominated	
2017	Screen Actors Guild Awards	Outstanding Performance by a Stunt Ensemble in a Television Series	Luke Cage	Nominated	
2017	NAACP Image Awards	Outstanding Actor in a Drama Series	Mike Colter	Nominated	
2017	NAACP Image Awards	Outstanding Writing in a Dramatic Series	Akela Cooper for "Manifest"	Nominated	
2017	Golden Reel Awards	TV – Short Form Musical Score	"Soliloquy of Chaos"	Nominated	
2017	Peabody Awards	Entertainment and Children's programs	Luke Cage	Nominated	
2017	MTV Movie & TV Awards	Best Hero	Mike Colter	Nominated	
2017	MTV Movie & TV Awards	Best Fight Against the System	Luke Cage	Nominated	
2017	Golden Trailer Awards	Best Action (TV Spot/Trailer/Teaser for a series)	"Defender"	Nominated	
2017	BET Awards	Best Actor	Mahershala Ali	Won	
2017	Saturn Awards	Best New Media Television Series	Luke Cage	Won (Note: Also awarded to Stranger Things)	
2017	Saturn Awards	Best Actor on a Television Series	Mike Colter	Nominated	
2017	Black Reel TV Awards	Outstanding Drama Series	Luke Cage	Nominated	
2017	Black Reel TV Awards	Outstanding Actor, Drama Series	Mike Colter	Nominated	
2017	Black Reel TV Awards	Outstanding Supporting Actress, Drama Series	Rosario Dawson	Nominated	
2017	Black Reel TV Awards	Outstanding Directing, Drama Series	Clark Johnson for "You Know My Steez"	Nominated	
2017	Black Reel TV Awards	Outstanding Writing, Drama Series	Cheo Hodari Coker for "Moment of Truth"	Won	
2017	Black Reel TV Awards	Outstanding Guest Performer, Drama Series	Mahershala Ali	Won	
2017	Black Reel TV Awards	Outstanding Guest Performer, Drama Series	Frankie Faison	Nominated	
2017	Black Reel TV Awards	Outstanding Music (Comedy, Drama, TV Movie or Limited Series)	Adrian Younge & Ali Shaheed Muhammad (composers); Gabe Hilfer & Season Kent (music supervisors)	Nominated	
2017	Primetime Creative Arts Emmy Awards	Outstanding Stunt Coordination for a Drama Series, Limited Series, or Movie	James Lew	Won	
2017	Hollywood Music in Media Awards	Original Song – TV Show/Limited Series	"Bulletproof Love" for Method Man	Nominated	
2017	Hollywood Music in Media Awards	Main Title Theme – TV Show/Limited Series	Ali Shaheed Muhammad and Adrian Younge	Nominated	
2018	People's Choice Awards	The Sci-Fi/Fantasy Show of 2018	Luke Cage	Nominated	
2019	Black Reel TV Awards	Outstanding Guest Actor, Drama Series	Ron Cephas Jones	Nominated	
2019	Black Reel TV Awards	Outstanding Actress in a Drama Series	Alfre Woodard	Nominated	
2019	Black Reel TV Awards	Outstanding Outstanding Supporting Actor, Drama Series	Mustafa Shakir	Nominated	
2019	NAACP Image Awards	Outstanding Directing in a Drama Series	Salli Richardson-Whitfield	Nominated	
2019	NAACP Image Awards	Outstanding Actress in a Drama Series	Alfre Woodard	Nominated	
2019	NAACP Image Awards	Outstanding Soundtrack/Compilation	Adrian Younge & Ali Shaheed Muhammad	Nominated	

== Cancellation and future ==
By the end of July 2018, work in the series' writers room was believed to have begun on a third season, though Netflix had yet to make a decision on whether the season would be ordered at that point. Coker planned to name the season's episodes after Public Enemy songs, which would have been: "Public Enemy #1", "Don't Believe the Hype", "Louder Than a Bomb", "Burn Hollywood Burn", "You're Gonna Get Yours", "Can't Truss It", "Brothers Gonna Work It Out", "Can't Do Nuttin' for Ya Man", "Shut 'Em Down", "Show 'Em Whatcha Got", "Black Steel in the Hour of Chaos", "Welcome to the Terrordome", and "Rebel Without a Pause".

In September 2018, the writers room was put on hold so Netflix and Marvel could work out how to adjust the season from the expected 13 episodes to a shorter 10-episode run. Six episodes had been written and two more had been outlined. During the week of October 15, the written scripts of those 10 episodes were delivered to Netflix and Marvel, incorporating ideas that had been plotted out for six months and notes received from Netflix and Marvel executives. Some of the executives had issues with these scripts, despite them featuring many of the notes they asked to be included, and the creative differences devolved into "behind-the-scenes turmoil" by the end of the week. There were some demands that a new showrunner be found for the season. With Marvel and Netflix on opposite sides of this disagreement, and the series being costly for Netflix even though they did not own the property, "the only viable exit strategy" was cancellation. The series was officially canceled by Netflix on October 19, 2018. Deadline Hollywood noted that, unlike fellow series Iron Fist which had been canceled a week earlier, Marvel had no plans to continue or revive the series on another platform such as Disney+, especially since, per the original deal between Marvel and Netflix for the series, the characters could not appear in any non-Netflix series or films for at least two years following the cancellation of Luke Cage. Kevin A. Mayer, chairman of Walt Disney Direct-to-Consumer and International, said it was possible that Disney+ could revive the series but this had not been discussed. In February 2019, Hulu's senior vice president of originals Craig Erwich said that streaming service was open to reviving the series, along with the other former Netflix series.

Colter stated in December 2020 that there had not been any discussions with Marvel Studios regarding him reprising the role and added, "I know fans are eager to see something with the character. I know I established him and it was an honor to do that, but I don't know what the future holds... If something happens, I'd love to have a conversation with them, but for now I'm not holding my breath, I'm happy either way, it was a good run." In February 2022, Coker said he hoped that Colter and Missick would be asked to reprise their roles if Marvel Studios chose to feature the characters again, and was open to creating commentary tracks or a retrospective podcast for the series. Ahead of Charlie Cox's appearance as Daredevil in Echo, which was released in January 2024, Marvel Studios' head of streaming Brad Winderbaum acknowledged that Marvel Studios had previously been "a little bit cagey" about what was part of their Sacred Timeline, noting how there had been the corporate divide between what Marvel Studios created and what Marvel Television created. He continued that as time had passed, Marvel Studios began to see "how well integrated the [Marvel Television] stories are" and he personally felt confident in saying Daredevil specifically was part of the Sacred Timeline. With Echo's release, all of the Netflix series were retroactively added to the MCU Disney+ timeline, with Luke Cage placed alongside the Phase Two content of the MCU, after Ant-Man (2015). An update to the Disney+ timeline split out the series by season, with Luke Cage's second season placed between Doctor Strange (2016) and Thor: Ragnarok (2017).

In January 2026, Colter said there had been conversations about him reprising his role. He was willing to give fans hope about a potential return because discussions were "in a better position to see this come into fruition faster than we think", and pointed to the returns of Cox and Jessica Jones actress Krysten Ritter in the Marvel Studios series Daredevil: Born Again (2025–present). Colter said his feelings on playing Luke Cage had evolved since the series was cancelled, particularly after discussions with Coker, and he now felt that he had "unfinished business" with the character. Colter appears in the second season finale episode of Born Again, and will return for its third season.
