= Black Reel Award for Outstanding Directing, Drama Series =

Annual US television award

- Awarded for: Outstanding Directing, Drama Series
- Country: United States
- Presented by: Black Reel Awards for Television
- First award: 2017
- Currently held by: Cheryl Dunye Bridgerton (2022)
- Website: blackreelawards.com

The Black Reel Award for Television for Outstanding Directing, Drama Series is an American annual award presented to the best directing of a television drama series for a particular episode.

== 2010s ==
| Year | Program | Episode | Nominee | Network |
|---|---|---|---|---|
2017; 1st
| 2017; 1st | This Is Us | "I Call Marriage" | George Tillman Jr. | NBC |
| 2017; 1st | Empire | "A Furnace for Your Foe" | Sanaa Hamri | FOX |
| 2017; 1st | The Get Down | "One by One, Into the Dark" | Clark Johnson | Netflix |
| 2017; 1st | Luke Cage | "You Know My Steez" | Clark Johnson | Netflix |
| 2017; 1st | Queen Sugar | "First Things First" | Ava DuVernay | OWN |
2018 (2nd)
| 2018 (2nd) | The Chi | "Pilot" | Rick Famuyiwa | Showtime |
| 2018 (2nd) | Queen Sugar | "Fruit of the Flower" | Cheryl Dunye | OWN |
| 2018 (2nd) | Scandal | "People Like Me" | Joe Morton | ABC |
| 2018 (2nd) | Scandal | "The People v. Olivia Pope" | Kerry Washington | ABC |
| 2018 (2nd) | Black Lightning | "The Resurrection" | Salim Akil | CW |
2019; 3rd
| 2019; 3rd | This Is Us | "Don't Take My Sunshine Away" | George Tillman Jr. | NBC |
| 2019; 3rd | Queen Sugar | "A Rock, A River, A Tree" | DeMane Davis | OWN |
| 2019; 3rd | Pose | "Love is the Message" | Janet Mock | FX |
| 2019; 3rd | Black Lightning | "The Book of the Apocalypse: Chapter Two: The Omega" | Salim Akil | CW |
| 2019; 3rd | This Is Us | "R&B" | Kevin Hooks | NBC |

== 2020s ==
| Year | Program | Episode | Nominee | Network |
|---|---|---|---|---|
2020; 4th
| 2020; 4th | Pose | "In My Heels" | Janet Mock | FX |
| 2020; 4th | Godfather of Harlem | "By Whatever Means Necessary" | John Ridley | EPIX |
| 2020; 4th | Queen Sugar | "I Am" | Ayoka Chenzira | OWN |
| 2020; 4th | Hunters | "(Ruth 1:16)" | Millicent Shelton | Amazon Prime Video |
| 2020; 4th | This Is Us | "A Hell of a Week: Part One" | Kevin Hooks | NBC |
2021; 5th
| 2021; 5th | Lovecraft Country | "Jig-a-Bobo" | Misha Green | HBO |
| 2021; 5th | Pose | "The Trunk" | Tina Mabry | FX |
| 2021; 5th | This Is Us | "Birth Mother" | Kay Oyegun | NBC |
| 2021; 5th | The Mandalorian | "Chapter 15: The Believer" | Ricky Famuyiwa | Disney+ |
| 2021; 5th | Snowfall | "Sleeping Dogs" | Carl Seaton | FX |
2022; 6th
| 2022; 6th | Bridgerton | "The Viscount Who Loved Me" | Cheryl Dunye | Netflix |
| 2022; 6th | Bel-Air | "Dreams and Nightmares" | Morgan Cooper | Peacock |
| 2022; 6th | Better Call Saul | "Axe and Grind" | Giancarlo Esposito | AMC |
| 2022; 6th | This Is Us | "Our Little Island Girl: Part Two" | Kevin Hooks | NBC |
| 2022; 6th | Winning Time: The Rise of the Lakers Dynasty | "Pieces of a Man" | Tanya Hamilton | HBO |

== Programs with multiple awards ==
2 awards

- This Is Us

== Programs with multiple nominations ==
6 nominations

- This Is Us

4 nominations

- Queen Sugar

3 nominations

- Pose

2 nominations

- Black Lightning
- Scandal

== Total awards by network ==
- NBC – 2
- FX - 1
- HBO - 1
- Netflix - 1
- Showtime - 1

== Individuals with multiple awards ==
2 awards

- George Tillman Jr.

== Individuals with multiple nominations ==
3 nominations

- Kevin Hooks

2 nominations

- Salim Akil
- Rick Famuyiwa
- Clark Johnson
- Janet Mock
- George Tillman Jr.
