= Nathan Louis Jackson =

American screenwriter and playwright (1978–2023)

Nathan Louis Jackson (December 4, 1978 – August 22, 2023) was an American screenwriter and playwright. He attended Kansas State University and majored in Theater, specializing in Playwriting.

== Career ==
In 2006, Jackson's work, The Last Black Play, was selected for presentation at the national festival held at the Kennedy Center, where his play won the Lorraine Hansberry Playwriting Award and the Mark Twain Comedy Playwriting Award. Jackson's later play Broke-Ology, was produced at the 2008 Williamstown Theatre Festival, Lincoln Center, Kansas City Rep, and other theaters nationally. He was a writer-producer on the Netflix show, Luke Cage. Jackson twice received the Lorraine Hansberry Playwriting Award. He died on August 22, 2023, at the age of 44. He is lived on by his wife Megan Mascorro-Jackson.
