= Black Reel Award for Outstanding Drama Series =

Annual US television award

- Awarded for: Outstanding Drama Series
- Country: United States
- Presented by: Black Reel Awards for Television
- First award: 2017
- Currently held by: Bel-Air (2022)
- Website: blackreelawards.com

The Black Reel Award for Television for Outstanding Drama Series is an annual award given to the best television drama series of the year. This Is Us became the first winner in this category. The show also holds the record for most wins, with 2. This Is Us and Queen Sugar are currently tied for the most nominations in this category with 3 nominations.

This Is Us also became the first Network show to win this category while Pose became the first cable series to win.

== 2010s ==
Year	Program	Showrunners	Network
2017; 1st
2017; 1st	This Is Us (Season 1)	Dan Fogelman, showrunner	NBC
2017; 1st	Power (Season 3)	Courtney A. Kemp, showrunner	Starz
2017; 1st	Underground (season 2)	Misha Green & Joe Pokasi, showrunners	WGN America
2017; 1st	Luke Cage (season 1)	Cheo Hodari Coker, showrunner	Netflix
2017; 1st	Queen Sugar (Season 1)	Melissa Carter	OWN
2018 (2nd)
2018 (2nd)	Black Lightning (Season 1)	Salim Akil, showrunner	The CW
2018 (2nd)	Queen Sugar (Season 2)	Monica Macer, showrunner	OWN
2018 (2nd)	This Is Us (Season 2)	Dan Fogelman, Elizabeth Berger & Isaac Aptaker, showrunners	NBC
2018 (2nd)	The Chi (Season 1)	Elwood Reid, showrunner	Showtime
2018 (2nd)	Greenleaf (Season 2)	Craig Wright, showrunner	OWN
2019; 3rd
2019; 3rd	This Is Us (Season 3)	Dan Fogelman, Elizabeth Berger & Isaac Aptaker, showrunners	NBC
2019; 3rd	Claws (Season 2)	Janine Sherman Barrios, showrunner	TNT
2019; 3rd	Pose (Season 1)	Ryan Murphy, showrunner	FX
2019; 3rd	Black Lightning (Season 2)	Salim Akil, showrunner	The CW
2019; 3rd	All American (Season 1)	Nkechi Okoro, showrunner	The CW

== 2020s ==
Year	Program	Showrunners	Network
2020; 4th
2020; 4th	Pose (Season 2)	Ryan Murphy, showrunner	FX
2020; 4th	Godfather of Harlem (Season 1)	Chris Brancato, showrunner	EPIX
2020; 4th	For Life (Season 1)	Hank Steinberg	ABC
2020; 4th	All Rise (Season 1)	Denitira Harris-Lawrence & Greg Spottiswood	CBS
2020; 4th	Wu-Tang: An American Saga (Season 1)	Alex Tse, showrunner	HULU
2021; 5th
2021; 5th	Lovecraft Country (Season 1)	Misha Green, showrunner	HBO
2021; 5th	The Falcon and the Winter Soldier (Season 1)	Malcolm Spellman, showrunner	Disney+
2021; 5th	Queen Sugar (Season 5)	Anthony Sparks, showrunner	OWN
2021; 5th	Lupin (Season 1)	George Kay, showrunner	Netflix
2021; 5th	Snowfall (Season 4)	Dave Andron, showrunner	FX
2022; 6th			
2022; 6th	Bel-Air (Season 1)	T.J. Brady and Rasheed Newson, showrunners	Peacock
2022; 6th	Euphoria (Season 2)	Sam Levinson, showrunner	HBO
2022; 6th	Lupin (Season 2)	George Kay, showrunner	Netflix
2022; 6th	This is Us (Season 6)	Dan Fogelman, showrunner	NBC
2022; 6th	Winning Time: The Rise of the Lakers Dynasty (Season 1)	Max Borenstein, showrunner	HBO

== Programs with multiple awards ==
2 awards

- This Is Us

== Programs with multiple nominations ==
4 nominations

- This Is Us

3 nominations

- Queen Sugar

2 nominations

- Black Lightning
- Pose
- Lupin

== Total awards by network ==
- NBC – 2
- The CW - 1
- FX - 1
- HBO - 1
- Peacock - 1
