= Mike Colter =

American actor (born 1976)

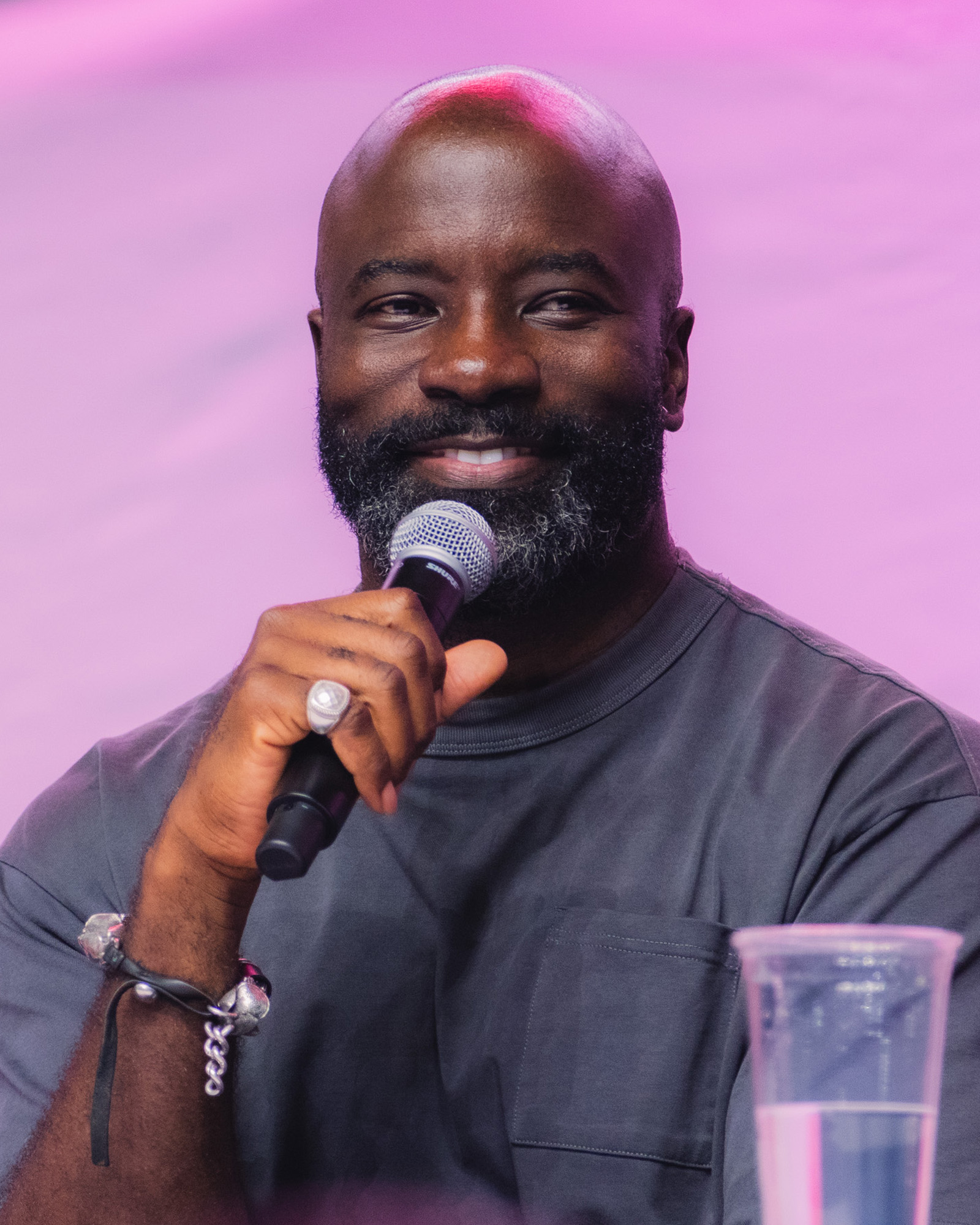
- Colter in 2025
- Born: August 26, 1976 (age 50)
- Education: Benedict College; University of South Carolina, Columbia (BA); Rutgers University, New Brunswick (MFA)
- Years active: 2002–present
- Spouse: Iva Colter (m. 2002)
- Children: 2
- Relatives: Viola Davis (second cousin)

Mike Colter (born August 26, 1976) is an American actor best known for his role as Luke Cage in the Marvel Cinematic Universe since 2015, including in the series Luke Cage (2016–2018).

He has also appeared as David Acosta in the CBS/Paramount+ series Evil (2019–2024), Lemond Bishop in the television series The Good Wife (2010–2015) and The Good Fight (2018–2019), Malcolm Ward in Ringer (2011–2012), and Agent J's father in Men in Black 3 (2012), and Jameson Locke in the Halo franchise (2014–2015).

== Early life ==
Colter is a graduate of Calhoun County High School. In his senior high school yearbook, his senior superlative as voted by the class was "most ambitious." Colter spent a year at Benedict College before transferring to the University of South Carolina, receiving a bachelor's degree in theater in 1999. He obtained an MFA degree in acting from the Rutgers University Mason Gross School of the Arts.

== Career ==
Colter's first role was in the film Million Dollar Baby as boxer Big Willie Little. He also guest starred on Law & Order: Trial By Jury, Law & Order: Criminal Intent, The Good Wife, ER, and The Parkers as well as several television films. He starred in the series Ringer.

In 2012, Colter appeared in Men in Black 3 as Agent J's father.

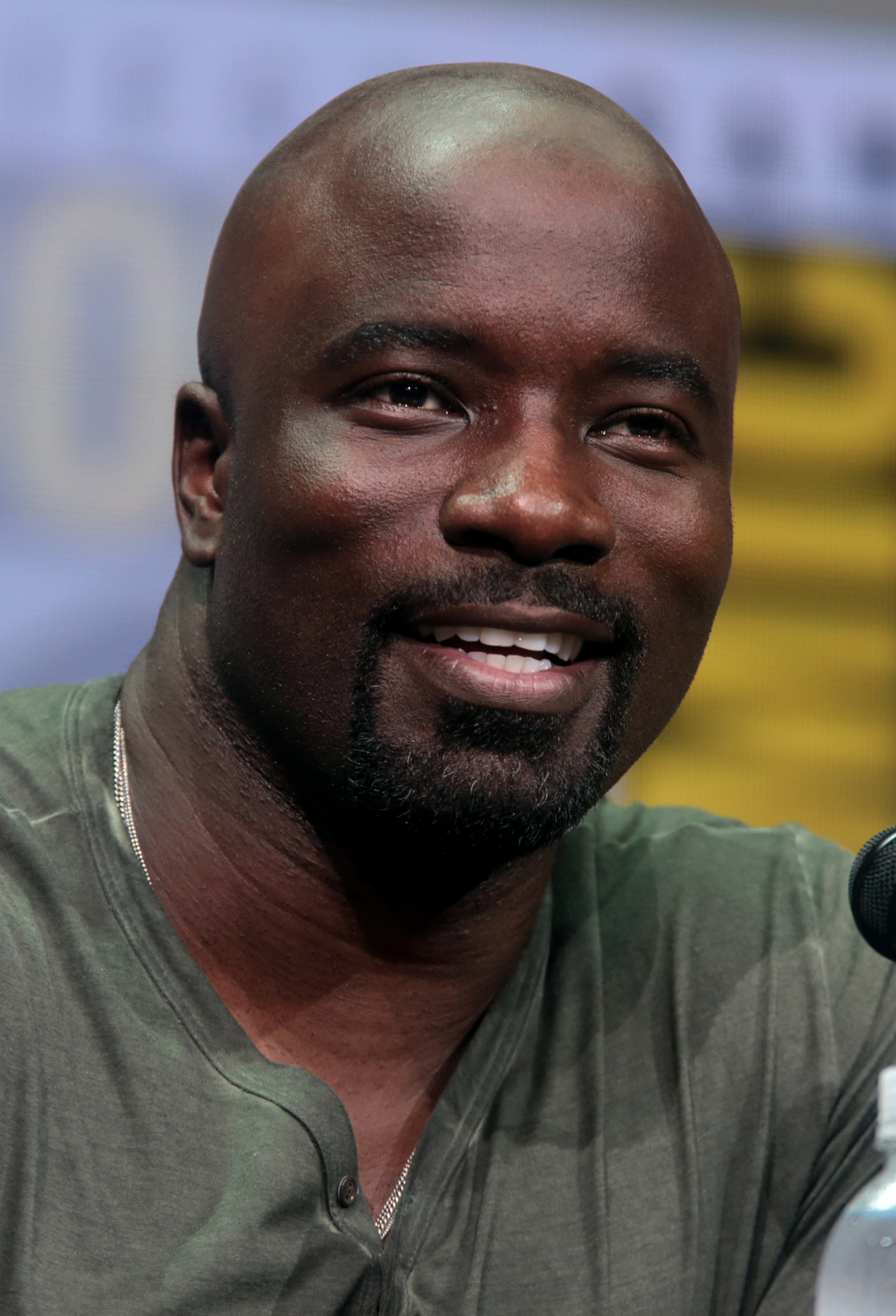
Colter in 2017

In 2014, Colter began portraying the role of Agent Jameson Locke in the Halo franchise. Colter starred in the series Halo: Nightfall and provided the motion capture for Locke in Halo 5: Guardians, with Ike Amadi voicing the character.

Colter co-starred as Luke Cage / Carl Lucas in Jessica Jones on Netflix. The first season was released online on November 20, 2015. This was followed by a solo series, Luke Cage, with the first season being released on September 30, 2016. The second season release followed on June 22, 2018. In between the two seasons, Colter also appeared as Cage in The Defenders.

Colter starred in the 2018 alien invasion film Extinction.

Colter was announced as the male lead in the CBS drama pilot, Evil as David Acosta, a Catholic seminarian who assesses unexplained phenomena for supernatural or scientific explanations.

In 2020, Colter starred in the Netflix anthology series Social Distance.

In 2023, Colter and Gerard Butler starred in the film Plane by Lionsgate Play. Colter was expected to headline a sequel titled Ship, but the film was cancelled before production commenced.

Colter reprised his role as Luke Cage in the second season finale of the Marvel Studios' Disney+ series Daredevil: Born Again and is set to return in the third season.

== Personal life ==
Colter met his future wife, Iva, at Rutgers University in New Jersey, where they were both graduate students. The couple married in 2002. They have two daughters. Colter is a second cousin of actress Viola Davis. He resides in Los Angeles.

In 2019, Colter played for the "home" roster during the NBA All-Star Celebrity Game at the Bojangles' Coliseum in Charlotte, North Carolina. The roster was made up of celebrities with Carolina roots.

== Filmography ==
=== Film ===
Year	Title	Role	Notes
2004	Million Dollar Baby	Big Willie Little	
2005	Brooklyn Lobster	Jamal	
2007	And Then Came Love	Yuppie Paul	
2010	Salt	CIA Tactical Leader	
2012	Men in Black 3	Col. James Darrell Edwards II	
2012	Zero Dark Thirty	DEVGRU Operative Mike	
2017	Girls Trip	Stewart Pierce	
2018	Extinction	David	
2018	Skin	Daryle Lamont Jenkins	
2019	Before You Know It	Charles	
2019	Breakthrough	Tommy Shine	
2019	Black and Blue	Darius Tureau	
2020	Fatale	Rafe Grimes	
2021	South of Heaven	Whit Price	
2022	I'm Charlie Walker	Charlie Walker	
2022	Carter	Smith	
2023	Plane	Louis Gaspare	
2023	Murder City	Neil	
2024	The Union	Nick Faraday	
2025	Alarum	Orlin	
TBA	Casket Girls †	Galpin	Post-production

=== Television ===
Year	Title	Role	Notes
2002	ER	Watts	Episode: "Hindsight"
2002	The Parkers	Lamar	Episode: "Lights, Camera, Action"
2005	Law & Order: Trial by Jury	Officer Billy Tolbert	Episode: "Blue Wall"
2005	Silver Bells	Bill	Television film
2007	Law & Order: Criminal Intent	Dave Oldren	Episode: "Albatross"
2009	Taking Chance	Master Gunnery Sgt. Demetry	Television film
2009	Solving Charlie	Jack Dash	Television film
2009	Law & Order: Special Victims Unit	Joseph Serumaga	Episode: "Hell"
2010	Royal Pains	Officer Tanner	Episode: "Lovesick"
2010–2015	The Good Wife	Lemond Bishop	Recurring cast (season 1–2 & 4–6); 20 episodes Guest (season 3); Episode: "The Penalty Box"
2011	Blue Bloods	Cliff Reacher	Episode: "The Blue Templar"
2011–2012	Ringer	Malcolm Ward	Main cast; 16 episodes
2013	Criminal Minds	Colin Bramwell	Episode: "Final Shot"
2013	The Surgeon General	Dr. McCallan	Television film
2013–2014	American Horror Story: Coven	David	Recurring cast; 3 episodes
2013–2015	The Following	Nick Donovan	Recurring cast (season 1 & 3); 8 episodes
2014	Halo: Nightfall	Agent Jameson Locke	Main cast; 5 episodes
2015	Agent X	Miles Lathem	Main cast; 10 episodes
2015–2019	Jessica Jones	Luke Cage	Main role (season 1); 7 episodes Guest role (season 3); Episode: "A.K.A. Everything"
2016	Comedy Bang! Bang!	Himself	Episode: "Mike Colter Wears a Pink Button Up and Black Boots"
2016–2018	Luke Cage	Luke Cage / Carl Lucas	Lead role; 26 episodes
2017	Hollywood Game Night	Himself/Celebrity Player	Episode: "Playing Hardwick to Get"
2017	Breakthrough	Himself/Narrator (voice)	Episode: "Addiction: A Psychedelic Cure?"
2017	The Defenders	Luke Cage	Main role, miniseries; 8 episodes
2018	Comic Book Men	Himself	Episode: "Power Man vs. Counter Man"
2018	American Dad!	Guerrilla Soldier (voice)	Episode: "(You Gotta) Strike for Your Right"
2018–2019	The Good Fight	Lemond Bishop	2 episodes
2019	Drop the Mic	Himself	Episode: "Mike Colter vs. Ne-Yo and Christina Milian vs. Ashlee Simpson"
2019	Hollywood Game Night	Himself/Celebrity Player	Episode: "Kiss Me in Lamorne-ing"
2019	Seis Manos	Brister (voice)	Main cast; 8 episodes
2019–2024	Evil	David Acosta	Main cast; 50 episodes
2020	Tiny Creatures	Narrator (voice)	Main cast; 8 episodes
2020	Monsterland	Brian Cooke	Episode: "Newark, New Jersey"
2020	Social Distance	Ike	Episode: "Delete All Future Events"
2021	Match Game	Himself/Celebrity Panelist	Episode #6.2
2021	City Confidential	Himself/Narrator (voice)	Main narrator (season 12)
2024	Accused	John	Episode: "Megan's Story"
2026–2027	Daredevil: Born Again	Luke Cage	Guest role (season 2); Episode: "The Southern Cross"; Main role (season 3); Post-production
2026	M.I.A.	Dominick Pierre	Recurring cast; 3 episodes
2026	Big City Greens	Mr. Brawn (voice)	Episode: "Fitness Test"
2026–present	Cupertino	Michael Price	Main cast

=== Video games ===
Year	Title	Voice role	Notes
2014	Halo: The Master Chief Collection	Spartan Jameson Locke	
2015	Halo 5: Guardians	Spartan Jameson Locke	Also likeness Motion-capture only

== Awards and nominations ==
Year	Nominated work	Award	Category	Result
2017	Luke Cage	Black Reel Awards	Black Reel Award for Outstanding Actor in a Drama Series	Nominated
2017	Luke Cage	MTV Movie & TV Awards	MTV Movie Award for Best Hero	Nominated
2017	Luke Cage	NAACP Image Awards	NAACP Image Award for Outstanding Actor in a Drama Series	Nominated
2017	Luke Cage	Saturn Awards	Saturn Award for Best Actor on Television	Nominated
2018	The Defenders	NAACP Image Awards	NAACP Image Award for Outstanding Actor in a Drama Series	Nominated
2020	Evil	Critics' Choice Television Awards	Critics' Choice Television Award for Best Actor in a Drama Series	Nominated
2021	Evil	Critics' Choice Super Awards	Critics' Choice Super Award for Best Actor in a Horror Series	Nominated
2021	Evil	Saturn Awards	Saturn Award for Best Actor on Television	Nominated
