= Black Reel Award for Outstanding Guest Actor, Drama Series =

Annual US television award

- Awarded for: Outstanding Guest Actor, Drama Series
- Country: United States
- Presented by: Black Reel Awards for Television
- First award: 2017
- Currently held by: Courtney B. Vance, Lovecraft Country (2021)
- Website: blackreelawards.com

This article lists the winners and nominees for the Black Reel Award for Television for Outstanding Guest Actor, Drama Series. The category was first introduced as Outstanding Guest Performer, Drama Series, honoring both actors and actresses in guest starring roles on television. In 2018, the category was split into categories for each gender, resulting in the name change to its current title.

== Winners and nominees ==
Winners are listed first and highlighted in bold.

=== 2010s ===
Year	Performer	Series	Network	Ref
Outstanding Guest Performer, Drama Series
2017
2017	**Mahershala Ali**	**Luke Cage**	**Netflix**	
2017	Phylicia Rashad	Empire	FOX	
2017	Orlando Jones	American Gods	Starz	
2017	Frankie Faison	Luke Cage	Netflix	
2017	Khandi Alexander	Scandal	ABC	
2017	Jermel Nakia	This Is Us	NBC	
Outstanding Guest Actor, Drama Series
2018
2018	**Ron Cephas Jones**	**This Is Us**	**NBC**	
2018	Alimi Ballard	Queen Sugar	OWN	
2018	Roger Guenveur Smith	Queen Sugar	OWN	
2018	Common	The Chi	Showtime	
2018	Taye Diggs	Empire	FOX	
2019
2019	**Rob Morgan**	**This Is Us**	**NBC**	
2019	Carl Lumbly	This Is Us	NBC	
2019	Ron Cephas Jones	Luke Cage	Netflix	
2019	Common	The Chi	Showtime	
2019	Mahershala Ali	Room 104	HBO	

=== 2020s ===
Year	Actor	Series	Network	Ref
2020
2020	**Chad L. Coleman**	**All American**	**The CW**	
2020	Asante Blackk	This Is Us	NBC	
2020	David Alan Grier	Queen Sugar	OWN	
2020	Ron Cephas Jones	This Is Us	NBC	
2020	Michael B. Jordan	Raising Dion	Netflix	
2021
2021	**Courtney B. Vance**	**Lovecraft Country**	**HBO**	
2021	Giancarlo Esposito	The Boys	Amazon Prime Video	
2021	Larenz Tate	Power Book II: Ghost	Starz	
2021	Carl Weathers	The Mandalorian	Disney+	
2021	Carl Lumbly	The Falcon and the Winter Soldier	Disney+	

== Superlatives ==
Superlative	Outstanding Guest Actor, Drama Series
Actor with most awards	Multiple
Actor with most nominations	Ron Cephas Jones (3)
Actor with most nominations without ever winning	Common; Carl Lumbly (2)

== Programs with multiple awards ==
2 awards

- This Is Us

== Programs with multiple nominations ==
6 nominations

- This Is Us

3 nominations

- Luke Cage
- Queen Sugar

2 nominations

- The Chi

== Performers with multiple nominations ==
3 nominations

- Ron Cephas Jones

2 nominations

- Mahershala Ali
- Common
- Carl Lumbly

== Total awards by network ==
- NBC - 2
- The CW - 1
- HBO - 1
- Netflix - 1
