= Mt. Olivet Baptist Church (Harlem, New York) =

Church in Manhattan, New York

Coordinates: 40°48′18″N 73°56′53″W

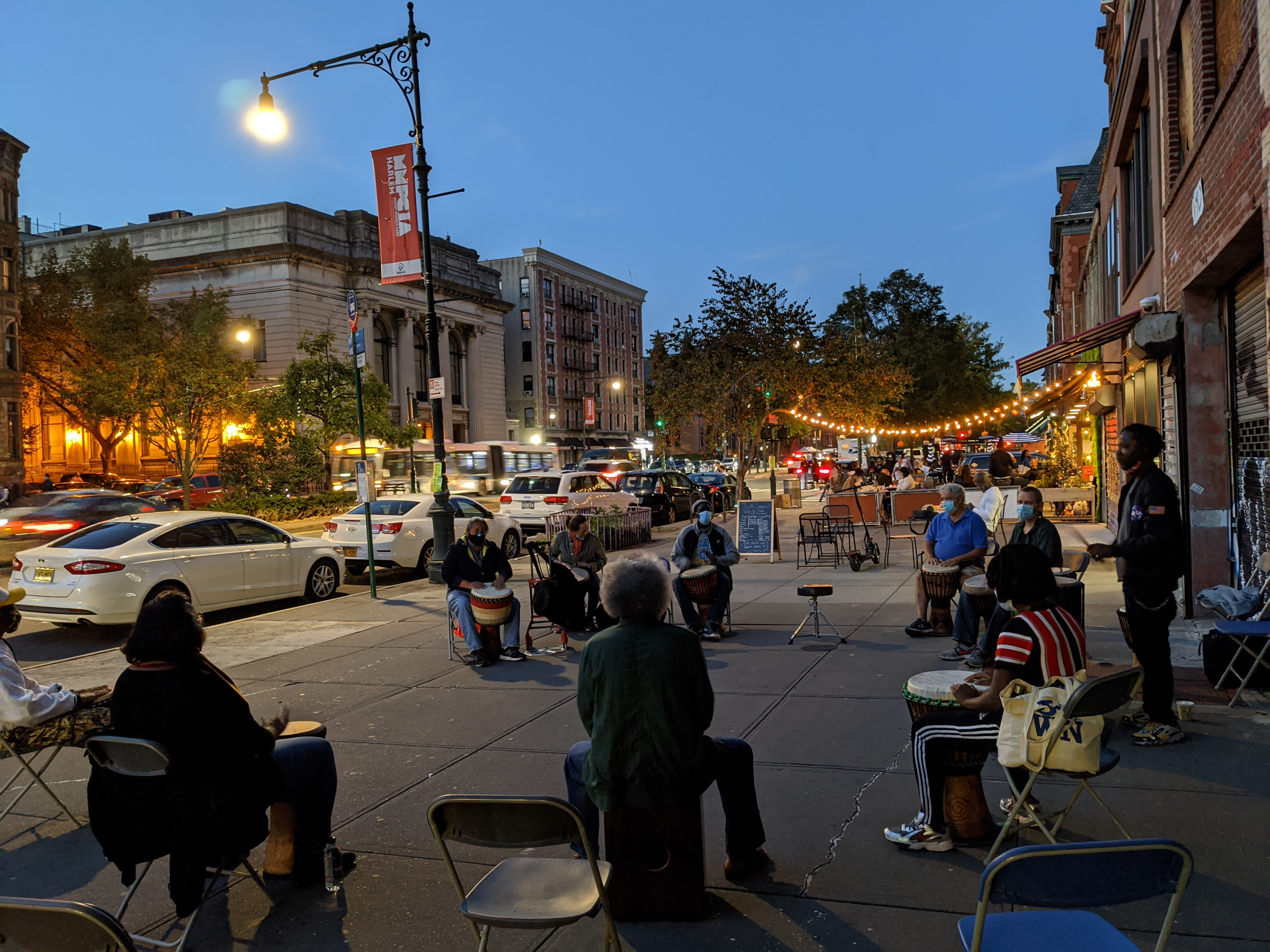
Mt. Olivet Baptist Church on left

Mt. Olivet Baptist Church is a historic church in the Harlem neighborhood of Manhattan in New York City.

Charles T. Walker served as pastor. Rev. O. Clay Maxwell served as pastor. Richetta Randolph Wallace under him.

The church building was constructed in 1907 for Temple Israel. It was purchased in 1925 and became the home for Mt. Olivet's African American congregation. Architectural features of the synagogue remain visible. Visitors to the church have included Hugo Chavez, Robert Mugabe, and Howard Dean.

The church is at 201 Lenox Avenue, also known as Malcolm X Boulevard. The church hosts an annual Martin Luther King Jr. Day service. The Harlem Gospel Choir performs at the church.

The Library of Congress has a photograph of attendees taken by Marilyn Nance.

== See also ==
- San Juan Hill, Manhattan
- Mount Olive Baptist Church (disambiguation)
- Olivet Baptist Church
- Coretti Arle-Titz
