= Black Reel Award for Outstanding Actor, Drama Series =

Annual US television award

- Awarded for: Outstanding Actor, Drama Series
- Country: United States
- Presented by: Black Reel Awards for Television
- First award: 2017
- Currently held by: Sterling K. Brown, This Is Us (2022)
- Website: blackreelawards.com

This article lists the winners and nominees for the Black Reel Award for Television for Outstanding Actor, Drama Series. This category was first introduced in 2017 and won by Sterling K. Brown for This Is Us. Brown currently holds the record for most wins in this category with 4 and is the most nominated person in this category with 5 nominations.

== Winners and nominees ==
Winners are listed first and highlighted in bold.

=== 2010s ===
Year	Actor	Series	Network	Ref
2017
2017	**Sterling K. Brown**	**This Is Us**	**NBC**	
2017	Mike Colter	Luke Cage	Netflix	
2017	Aldis Hodge	Underground	WGN America	
2017	Terrence Howard	Empire	FOX	
2017	Kofi Siriboe	Queen Sugar	OWN	
2018
2018	**Sterling K. Brown**	**This Is Us**	**NBC**	
2018	Omari Hardwick	Power	Starz	
2018	Kofi Siriboe	Queen Sugar	OWN	
2018	Cress Williams	Black Lightning	The CW	
2018	Jeffrey Wright	Westworld	HBO	
2019
2019	**Billy Porter**	**Pose**	**FX**	
2019	Sterling K. Brown	This Is Us	NBC	
2019	Brandon Micheal Hall	God Friended Me	CBS	
2019	Damson Idris	Snowfall	FX	
2019	Kofi Siriboe	Queen Sugar	OWN	

=== 2020s ===
Year	Actor	Series	Network	Ref
2020
2020	**Sterling K. Brown**	**This Is Us**	**NBC**	
2020	Nicholas Pinnock	For Life	ABC	
2020	Billy Porter	Pose	FX	
2020	Kofi Siriboe	Queen Sugar	OWN	
2020	Forest Whitaker	Godfather of Harlem	Epix	
2021
2021	**Jonathan Majors**	**Lovecraft Country**	**HBO**	
2021	Billy Porter	Pose	FX	
2021	Damson Idris	Snowfall	FX	
2021	Regé-Jean Page	Bridgerton	Netflix	
2021	Anthony Mackie	The Falcon and the Winter Soldier	Disney+	
2022
2022	**Sterling K. Brown**	**This Is Us**	**NBC**	
2022	Chiwetel Ejiofor	The Man Who Fell to Earth	Showtime	
2022	Damson Idris	Snowfall	FX	
2022	Omar Sy	Lupin	Netflix	
2022	Forest Whitaker	Godfather of Harlem	EPIX	

== Superlatives ==
Superlative	Outstanding Actor, Drama Series
Actor with most awards	Sterling K. Brown (3)
Actor with most nominations	Sterling K. Brown; Kofi Siriboe (4)
Actor with most nominations without ever winning	Kofi Siriboe (4)

== Programs with multiple awards ==
4 awards

- This Is Us

== Performers with multiple awards ==
4 awards

- Sterling K. Brown (2 consecutive)

== Programs with multiple nominations ==
5 nominations

- This Is Us

4 nominations

- Queen Sugar

3 nominations

- Pose
- Snowfall

2 nominations

- Godfather of Harlem
- Lupin

== Performers with multiple nominations ==
5 nominations

- Sterling K. Brown

4 nominations

- Kofi Siriboe

3 nominations

- Damson Idris
- Billy Porter

2 nominations

- Omar Sy
- Forest Whitaker

== Total awards by network ==
- NBC - 4
- FX - 1
- HBO - 1
