= Mount Olive Baptist Church =

Mt. Olive Baptist Church may refer to:

- Mount Olive Missionary Baptist Church (Mobile, Alabama), listed on the US National Register of Historic Places (NRHP)
- Mount Olive Missionary Baptist Church (Nassauville, Florida), NRHP-listed
- Mt. Olive Baptist Church (Mullins, South Carolina), NRHP-listed
