= Cheo Hodari Coker =

American writer

- Born: Storrs, Connecticut, United States
- Occupations: Writer, television producer, journalist

Cheo Hodari Coker is an American former music journalist turned television writer and producer known for such television series as Luke Cage, NCIS: Los Angeles, Southland and Ray Donovan. Coker also wrote the screenplay for the 2009 biographical film Notorious, based on the life and death of The Notorious B.I.G.

== Filmography ==
=== Television ===
Year(s)	Title	Credit
2011	Southland	Writer, Co-Producer, Supervising Producer
2012–2013	NCIS: Los Angeles	Writer, Supervising Producer
2013–2014	Almost Human	Writer, Co-Executive Producer
2014–2020	Ray Donovan	Writer, Co-Executive Producer
2016–2018	Luke Cage	Creator, Writer, Executive Producer, Showrunner

=== Film ===
Year(s)	Title	Credit
2009	Notorious	Co-writer
2018	Creed II	Story writer
2026	Billy Preston: That's The Way God Planned It	Co-writer, Producer
TBA	Nightwatch	Screenwriter
