= Black Reel Award for Outstanding Supporting Actress, Drama Series =

Annual US television award

- Awarded for: Outstanding Supporting Actress, Drama Series
- Country: United States
- Presented by: Black Reel Awards for Television
- First award: 2017
- Currently held by: Susan Kelechi Watson, This Is Us (2022)
- Website: blackreelawards.com

This article lists the winners and nominees for the Black Reel Award for Television for Outstanding Supporting Actress, Drama Series. This category was first introduced in 2017 and won by Thandiwe Newton for Westworld. Susan Kelechi Watson has the most wins in this category with 3.

== Winners and nominees ==
Winners are listed first and highlighted in bold.

=== 2010s ===
Year	Actress	Series	Network	Ref
2017
2017	**Thandiwe Newton**	**Westworld**	**HBO**	
2017	Uzo Aduba	Orange Is the New Black	Netflix	
2017	Aisha Hinds	Underground	WGN America	
2017	Rosario Dawson	Luke Cage	Netflix	
2017	Danai Gurira	The Walking Dead	AMC	
2018
2018	**Susan Kelechi Watson**	**This Is Us**	**NBC**	
2018	Lynn Whitfield	Greenleaf	OWN	
2018	Bianca Lawson	Queen Sugar	OWN	
2018	Thandiwe Newton	Westworld	HBO	
2018	Tessa Thompson	Westworld	HBO	
2019
2019	**Susan Kelechi Watson**	**This Is Us**	**NBC**	
2019	Tina Lifford	Queen Sugar	OWN	
2019	Lynn Whitfield	Greenleaf	OWN	
2019	Indya Moore	Pose	FX	
2019	Karimah Westbrook	All American	The CW	

=== 2020s ===
Year	Actress	Series	Network	Ref
2020
2020	**Thandiwe Newton**	**Westworld**	**HBO**	
2020	Zoë Kravitz	Big Little Lies	HBO	
2020	Gugu Mbatha-Raw	The Morning Show	Apple TV+	
2020	Susan Kelechi Watson	This Is Us	NBC	
2020	Simone Missick	Altered Carbon	Netflix	
2021
2021	**Adjoa Andoh**	**Bridgerton**	**Netflix**	
2021	Aunjanue Ellis	Lovecraft Country	HBO	
2021	Wunmi Mosaku	Lovecraft Country	HBO	
2021	Michael Hyatt	Snowfall	FX	
2021	Susan Kelechi Watson	This Is Us	NBC	
2022
2022	**Susan Kelechi Watson**	**This Is Us**	**NBC**	
2022	Audra McDonald	The Gilded Age	HBO	
2022	Coco Jones	Bel-Air	Peacock	
2022	Lorraine Toussaint	The Equalizer	CBS	
2022	Adjoa Andoh	Bridgerton	Netflix	

== Superlatives ==
Superlative	Outstanding Supporting Actress, Drama Series
Actress with most awards	Susan Kelechi Watson (3)
Actress with most nominations	Susan Kelechi Watson (5)
Actress with most nominations without ever winning	Lynn Whitfield (2)

== Programs with multiple awards ==
3 awards

- Westworld

2 awards

- This Is Us

== Performers with multiple awards ==
3 awards

- Susan Kelechi Watson (2 consecutive)

2 awards

- Thandiwe Newton

== Programs with multiple nominations ==
5 nominations

- This Is Us

4 nominations

- Westworld

2 nominations

- Bridgerton
- Greenleaf
- Lovecraft Country
- Queen Sugar

== Performers with multiple nominations ==
5 nominations

- Susan Kelechi Watson

3 nominations

- Thandiwe Newton

2 nominations

- Adjoa Andoh
- Lynn Whitfield

== Total awards by network ==
- NBC - 3
- HBO - 2
- Netflix - 1
