= Ermias Ghermay =

Ethiopian people-smuggler

Ermias Ghermay is an Ethiopian people-smuggler who is believed to be the boss of one of the main human smuggling cartels in Libya.

== See also ==
- Mered Medhanie
