= Snapology =

Snapology model of a cube.

In geometry and modular origami, snapology is a technique for constructing three-dimensional geometric structures from folded paper strips. Its creator is Heinz Strobl.

== Modules ==
Snapology modules are created by folding strips of paper along divisions into squares. Each strip is folded into a shape corresponding to a polygon that forms part of the final structure.

Depending on the number of segments, paper strips can be folded into modules representing:

- triangles,
- squares,
- pentagons,
- other polygons with equal side lengths occurring in the construction.

In addition to the surface modules, shorter paper strips are used as connectors. These pass through adjacent modules and hold the entire structure together by mechanical interlocking.

== Construction ==
Snapology structures are assembled by joining many modules folded from paper strips. The modules are arranged to form closed three-dimensional structures, most commonly models of polyhedra.

Unlike traditional origami, snapology uses multiple separate paper elements that are assembled into a larger structure.

== Geometry ==
From the perspective of geometry, a snapology model can be interpreted as a transformation of an equilateral polyhedron, that is, a polyhedron whose edges are all of equal length. The construction corresponds to removing all faces of the original polyhedron and replacing each edge with a square face whose side length equals the length of the original edge.

The newly created squares are positioned perpendicular to the removed faces and oriented outward from the polyhedron. Adjacent squares meet along their shared edges, and their connection corresponds to the characteristic snapology method of interlocking module edges ("edge to edge"), providing mechanical stability to the structure.

The resulting construction forms a three-dimensional skeletal framework of the original polyhedron composed of square faces corresponding to its edges, while the original faces remain open.
