= Sonobe =

Modular origami module

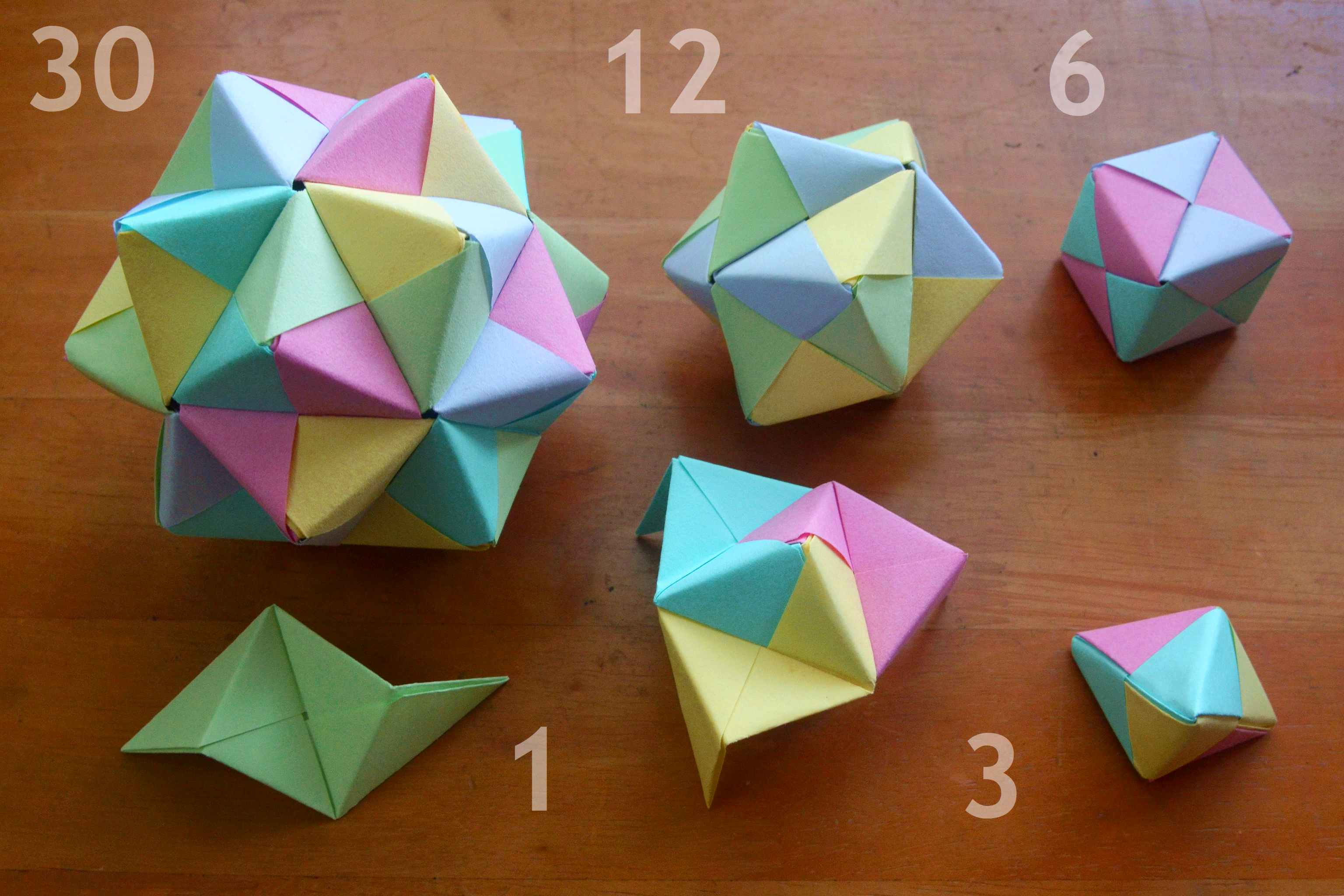
Numbers denote module count: 1. / One Sonobe module; 3. / Opened (left) and completed (right) Toshie's Jewel (triangular bipyramid); 6. / Cube (triakis tetrahedron); 12. / Triakis octahedron; 30. / Triakis icosahedron

The Sonobe module is one of the many units used to build modular origami. The popularity of Sonobe modular origami models derives from the simplicity of folding the modules, the sturdy and easy assembly, and the flexibility of the system.

== History ==
The origin of the Sonobe module is unknown. Two possible creators are Toshie Takahama (Japanese: 高浜利恵) and Mitsunobu Sonobe (Japanese: 薗部光伸), who published several books together and were both members of Sōsaku Origami Gurūpu '67 (Japanese: 創作折り紙グループ'67). The earliest appearance of a Sonobe module was in a cube attributed to Mitsunobu Sonobe in the Sōsaku Origami Gurūpu '67's magazine Origami in Issue 2 (1968). It does not reveal whether he invented the module or used an earlier design; the phrase "finished model by Mitsunobu Sonobe" is ambiguous. The diagram from Issue 2 reappears in 1970 in the group's book New Introduction to Origami (Japanese: 新しい折り紙入門, Hepburn: Atarashii origami nyūmon). Another 1970s appearance of the unit was in the model "Toshie's Jewel", from Toshie Takahama's book Creative Life With Creative Origami Vol 1 (Japanese: 暮しをかざるおりがみ). In the mid-1970s, Steve Krimball created the 30-unit ball, as mentioned in The Origamian vol. 13, no. 3 June 1976. Since then, many variations of modified Sonobe units have been developed; some examples of these can be found in Meenakshi Mukerji's book Marvelous Modular Origami (2007). Another variation of Sonobe models is the addition of secondary units to basic Sonobe unit forms to create new geometric shapes; some of which can be seen in Tomoko Fuse's book Unit Origami: Multidimensional Transformations (1990).

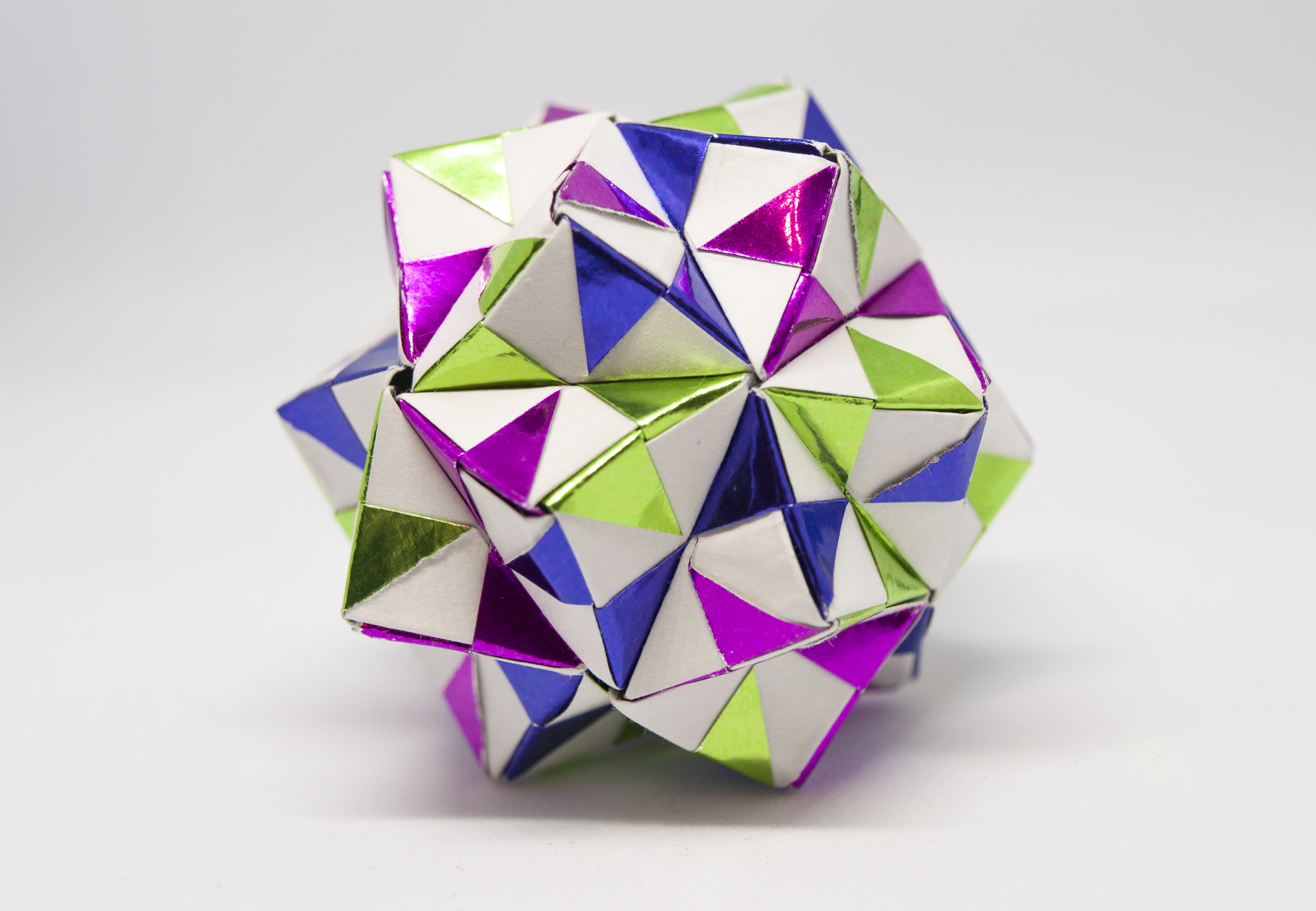
An example of modified Sonobe units used in a 30-unit triakis icosahedron. Units were folded from 1.5 in x 1.5 in sheets of foil paper.

== Description ==
Folding a Sonobe module (1–10) and assembly into a pyramid (11–12); * denote tabs and # denote pockets

Each individual unit is folded from a square sheet of paper, of which only one face is visible in the finished module; many ornamented variants of the plain Sonobe unit that expose both sides of the paper have been designed.

The Sonobe unit has the shape of a parallelogram with 45º and 135º angles, divided by creases into two diagonal tabs at the ends and two corresponding pockets within the inscribed center square. The system can build a wide range of three-dimensional geometric forms by docking these tabs into the pockets of adjacent units. Three interconnected Sonobe units will form an open-bottomed triangular pyramid with an equilateral triangle for the open bottom, and isosceles right triangles as the other three faces. It will have a right-angle apex (equivalent to the corner of a cube) and three tab/pocket flaps protruding from the base. This particularly suits polyhedra that have equilateral triangular faces: Sonobe modules can replace each notional edge of the original deltahedron by the central diagonal fold of one unit and each equilateral triangle with a right-angle pyramid consisting of one half each of three units, without dangling flaps. The pyramids can be made to point inwards; assembly is more difficult but some cases of encroaching can be obviously prevented.

The simplest shape made of these pyramids, often called "Toshie's Jewel" (shown above), is named after origami artist Toshie Takahama, who first printed a diagram of this in her 1974 book Creative Life with Creative Origami. It is a three-unit hexahedron built around the notional scaffold of a flat equilateral triangle (two "faces", three edges); the protruding tab/pocket flaps are simply reconnected on the underside, resulting in two triangular pyramids joined at the base, a triangular bipyramid.

A popular intermediate model is the triakis icosahedron, shown below. It requires 30 units to build.

== Usage ==
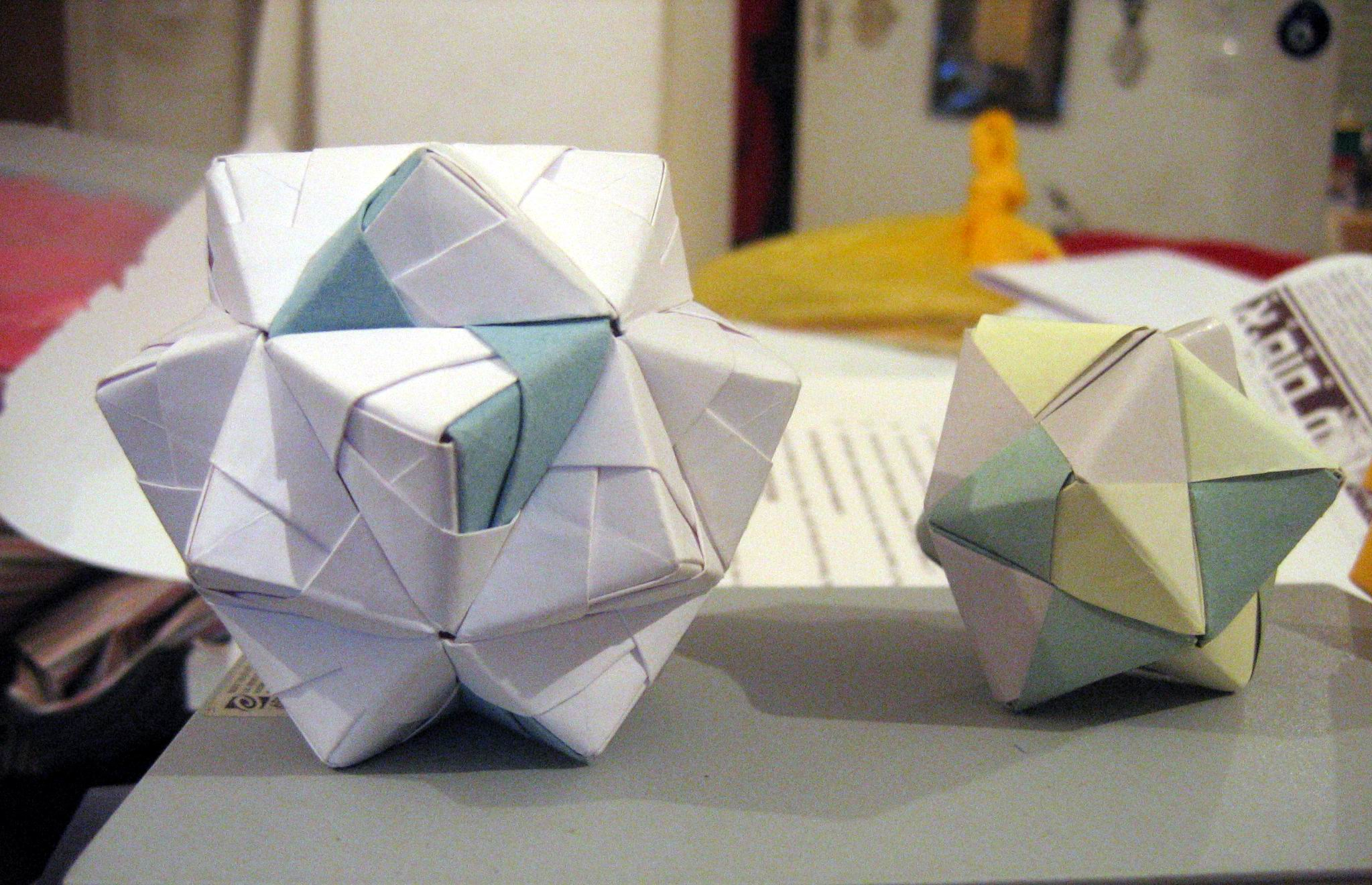
Examples of modular origami made up of Sonobe units: an augmented icosahedron and an augmented octahedron, which require 30 and 12 units, respectively.

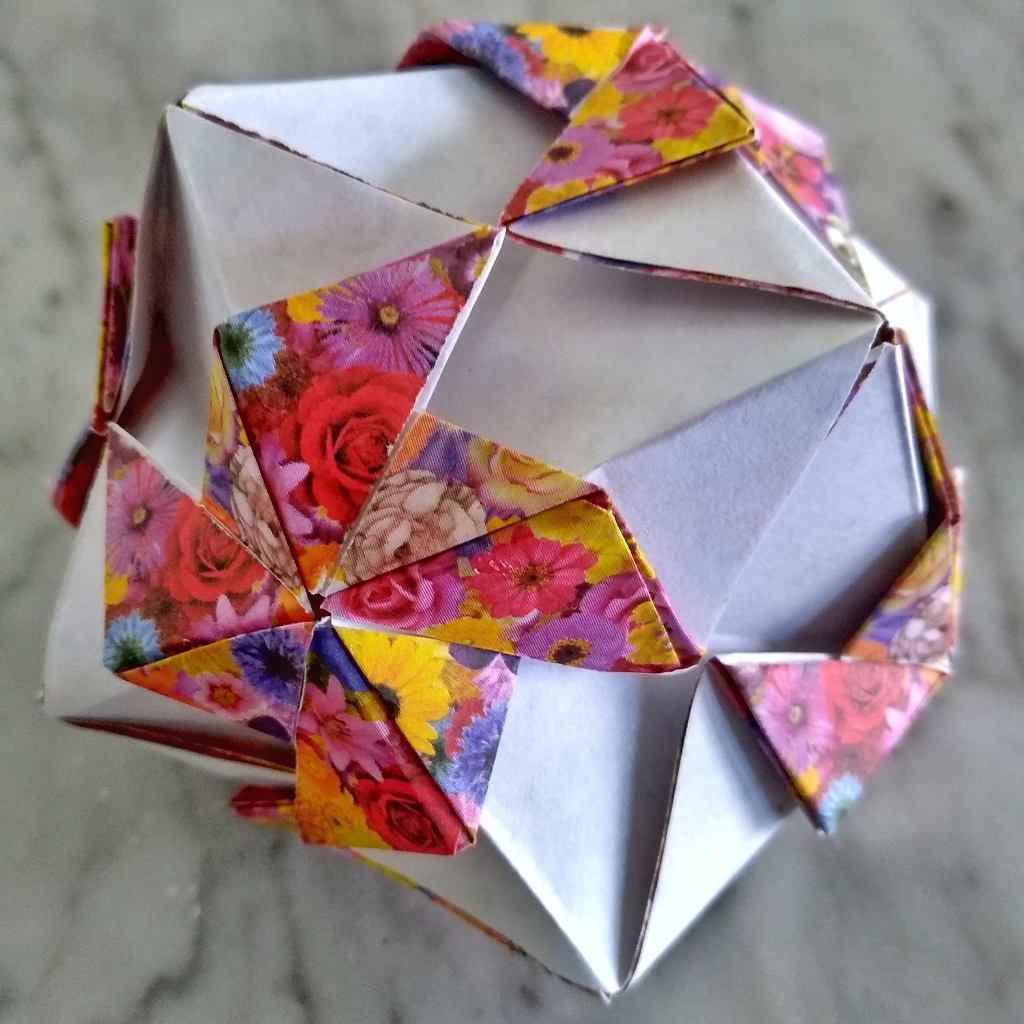
Shuriken kusudama made from 12 Sonobe units

The table below shows the correlation between three basic characteristics – faces, edges, and vertices – of polygons (composed of Toshie's Jewel sub-units) of varying size and the number of Sonobe units used:

| Number of Sonobe Units | Faces | Edges | Vertices |
|---|---|---|---|
| s | 2s | 3s | s + 2 |
| 3 | 6 | 9 | 5 |
| 6 | 12 | 18 | 8 |
| 12 | 24 | 36 | 14 |
| 30 | 60 | 90 | 32 |
| 90 | 180 | 270 | 92 |
| 120 | 240 | 360 | 122 |
| 270 | 540 | 810 | 272 |

The model made of three units results in a triangular bipyramid. Building a pyramid on each face of a regular tetrahedron, using six units, results in a cube (the central fold of each module lays flat, creating square faces instead of isosceles right triangular faces, and changing the formula for the number of faces, edges, and vertices), or triakis tetrahedron. Building a pyramid on each face of a regular octahedron, using twelve Sonobe units, results in a triakis octahedron. Building a pyramid on each face of a regular icosahedron requires 30 units, and results in a triakis icosahedron.

Uniform polyhedra can be adapted to Sonobe modules by replacing non-triangular faces with pyramids having equilateral faces; for example by adding pentagonal pyramids pointing inwards to the faces of a dodecahedron a 90-module ball can be obtained.

The 270-module ball looks like a very complicated shape, but it is just an icosahedron with each triangular face divided into 9 small triangles. Each small triangle is made of 3 sonobe units.

Arbitrary shapes, beyond symmetrical polyhedra, can also be constructed; a deltahedron with 2N faces and 3N edges requires 3N Sonobe modules. A popular class of arbitrary shapes consists of assemblies of equal size cubes in a regular cubic grid, which can be easily derived from the six unit cube by joining multiple ones at faces or edges.

There are two popular variants of the main assembly style of three modules in triangular pyramids, both using the same flaps and pockets and compatible with it:

- Joining four modules together (instead of three), forming a flattened square pyramid that can become part of a quilt or a larger polyhedral face, e.g. in 12 and 24 modules large cubes. Such a square lacks structural integrity because without the diagonal folds the flaps are not restrained to stay in the far corner of the pockets.
- Joining only two modules, forming a triangular fin that can be used as an ornament for suitable models and to make a 1 module triangle (one fin, made with the two halves of the same module) or a 2 module square (two fins).

== Bibliography ==
- Takahama, Toshie, and Kunihiko Kasahara. Origami for the Connoisseur. Japan Publications, Tokyo, 1987. ISBN 4-8170-9002-2
- Takahama, Toshie, "Creative Life with Creative Origami" Volume I (1974) (original source for Toshie's jewel)
- Sosaku Origami Group 67, Magazine 2 (Mitsunobu's original cube)
