= Snakehead (gang) =

Chinese human smuggling gang

Snakeheads
- Founding location: Fujian province, China
- Years active: 1990s–present
- Territory: Chinese communities around the world
- Ethnicity: Cantonese people, Fuzhou people, Hoklo people (Han Chinese)
- Membership (est.): Unknown
- Criminal activities: bribery, hostage taking, Identity document forgery, Illegal immigration, money laundering, murder and People smuggling
- Allies: 14K; Cosa Nostra (Italy); Inagawa-kai (Japan) Fujian gangs
- Rivals: Sun Yee On, Wo Hop To

Snakeheads (Chinese: 蛇头; pinyin: shé tóu; Hokkien: chôa-thâu) are Chinese gangs that smuggle people to other countries. They are found in the Fujian region of China and smuggle their customers into wealthier Western countries such as those in Western Europe, North America, Australia, and some nearby wealthier regions such as Taiwan and Japan.

Snakeheads use various methods to get their customers to the West. They may employ the use of stolen or altered passports, improperly obtained visas, and bribes to move people from nation to nation until they arrive at their final destination. They also may use fake business delegations and tour groups as a way of beating immigration controls. The rate of payment for successful smuggling can be as high as US$70,000.

One notable snakehead member was Cheng Chui Ping or "Sister Ping". Another is Guo Liang Chi, known mainly by his street name of Ah Kay, who was the mastermind of the Golden Venture cargo ship tragedy in 1993 that was financed by Sister Ping.

== Role in defection from North Korea ==
A North Korean emigrant seeking to enter South Korea may turn to a snakehead gang to be voluntarily smuggled out of North Korea. If the emigrant is unable to pay the snakeheads back, the emigrant may risk becoming a victim of human trafficking.

== In popular culture ==
- In the Lincoln Rhyme novel The Stone Monkey by Jeffery Deaver, the villain is a shadowy snakehead, nicknamed "the Ghost," who is intent on killing a family of Chinese immigrants who are the only witnesses alive who can identify him to the authorities.
- The Alex Rider novel Snakehead by Anthony Horowitz is the seventh novel in the series, in which Alex must infiltrate a Snakehead gang for ASIS (Australian Secret Intelligence Service).
- In the video game Grand Theft Auto: San Andreas, one of CJ's missions forces him to board a cargo ship carrying illegal Vietnamese immigrants run by a Vietnamese gang called the "Da Nang Boys". The leader of the gang is referred to only as "The Snakehead". The operation is a direct allusion to the Golden Venture fiasco in 1993, as the game itself takes place in the early 1990s.
- In the "Laughing Magician" story arc of the comic book Hellblazer, John Constantine enlists the aid of a snakehead gang boss.
- The 1980 Shaw Brothers production Lost Souls directed by Mou Tun Fei concerns the exploitation of illegal immigrants and features a gang of nasty snakeheads as the villains.
- The Oregon Files novels Dark Watch and Flood Tide by Clive Cussler features snakeheads as minor villains.
- The Fringe episode "Snakehead" features a gang that smuggles immunity-boosting parasites by feeding them to the Chinese immigrants that they are transporting, then cutting them out of the victims once the parasite has starved them to death.
- In an episode of Law & Order: Special Victims Unit titled "Debt", the SVU squad led by Elliot Stabler investigate a case of child neglect and uncover a conspiracy by a local snakehead to smuggle female Chinese immigrants for an illicit prostitution ring.
- The TV series Hawaii Five-0 (2010) featured a snakehead in the pilot episode who is sentenced to life imprisonment – later to be revealed as a subordinate of the archvillain Wo Fat.
- The zombie fiction novel World War Z by Max Brooks features a snakehead gang member as a character, revealing how the gangs have exploited the desperation of infected families hoping to escape China for Central and Western Asia.
- The movie Premium Rush refers to the snakehead gang as the recipient of the envelope that is being delivered.
- In the 2021 crime drama movie Snakehead, a Chinese immigrant named Tse is smuggled into New York City's Chinatown and rises through the ranks of a female-led Chinatown crime family while secretly searching for her daughter. The film is loosely inspired by that of Sister Ping.
- The main antagonists in the 1998 movie Lethal Weapon 4 are members of a snakehead gang which is found to be smuggling Chinese people into the United States and exploiting them.
- Mister Negative, a supervillain appearing in American comic books published by Marvel Comics, usually depicted as an enemy of Spider-Man, the Punisher, Shang-Chi, and Cloak and Dagger, began his criminal career as a member of a snakehead gang.

== See also ==
- List of Chinese criminal organizations
- People smuggling
- Coyote
- Triad
- Tongs
- Fujian gang
