= Jade Wu =

American dramatist (born 1953)

- Born: January 5, 1953 (age 73); Tokyo, Japan
- Education: UC-San Diego, Mira Costa College
- Relatives: Yuanlong Wang, grandfather

Jade Wu (born January 5, 1953) is a Chinese-American actress, playwright, producer, director, and editor. She is the granddaughter of actor and director Yuanlong Wang, who worked in Hong Kong, China, and Taiwan.

Wu has appeared in multiple daytime drama series on ABC, including General Hospital and One Life to Live, and has worked as a writer for Disney. She has directed and scripted documentaries presented at events such as the IFP Market, the Asian American International Film Festival, the Sundance Producers Conference, and the Anthology Film Archives in New York City. Her plays have been presented at the Santa Clara Experimental Theatre Festival and the La Jolla Studio Stage. Wu has participated on review panels for organizations including the National Endowment for the Arts, the New York State Council on the Arts, and the Individual Artist Grant Program, and has acted as a juror for the International Emmy Awards.

== Acting career ==
=== Film and television ===
In 1997, Wu had her first role as Sun-Rae Roh on Homicide: Life on the Street with Andre Braugher, Richard Belzer and Clark Johnson (who also directed), and writer Tom Fontana and executive producer Barry Levinson.

In 2004, she appeared on Law & Order Criminal Intent with director Frank Prinzi, and co-executive producer Warren Leight.

From 2016 to 2018, Wu played Connie Lin in the Marvel Original Luke Cage on Netflix with Mike Colter, and directors Paul McGuigan, Vincenzo Natali. In 2016, Wu had a recurring role as Judge Cara Bergen in the CBS series Bull with Michael Weatherly, and director Peter Leto; and as Katie's Mom in the HBO series Divorce with Sarah Jessica Parker and Thomas Hayden Church.

In 2018, Wu played a lead role of Dai Mah in the film Snakehead along with Sung Kang and Shuya Chang.

Wu played the lead role of Ahma Chin in The Motel, which won the Humanitas Prize and received an Independent Spirit Award Nomination. She has had additional recurring roles on The Afterparty, The Blacklist, DMZ, and One Life to Live.

Year	Title	Role	Episodes	Notes
1997	Homicide: Life on the Street	Sun-Rae Roh	2	TV
2002–2013	One Life to Live	Judith Chen	Unknown	TV
2004	The Jury	Maeve Li Sook	1	TV
2004	She Hates Me	Midwife		Film
2002, 2004	Law & Order: Criminal Intent	Mrs. Kaoru Miyazaki, Irene Chang	2	TV
2005	The Motel	Ahma Chen		Film
2012	Premium Rush	Bingo Caller		Film
2015	The Blacklist	Chinese Delegate	2	TV
2016	Limitless	Mary Wu	1	TV
2018	Billions	Warden Glynnis Robinson	1	TV
2018	Elementary	Elderly woman	1	TV
2016-2018	Luke Cage	Connie Lin	6	TV
2018	For Love	Mrs Minami		Film
2018-2019	Divorce	Katie's Mom	2	TV
2019	Manifest	Angela Graham	1	TV
2020	FBI: Most Wanted	Auntie Diane	1	TV
2020	Teenage Bounty Hunters	Linda Chu	1	TV
2020	For Life	Judge Julie Tanaka	2	TV
2021	Magnum P.I.	Oleen	1	TV
2021	Snakehead	Dai Mah		Film
2021	Awkafina is Nora from Queens	Cousin Rosalind	1	TV
2016-2021	Bull	Judge Cara Bergen	3	TV
2022	DMZ	Susie	3	TV
2022	Law & Order	Judge Carol Ward	1	TV
2023	The After Party	Aunt Ruth	5	TV

=== Theatre ===
Wu was part of the cast of the 2006 production of Mother Courage and Her Children, produced The Public, at the Delacorte Theatre in New York City's Central Park with Meryl Streep, Kevin Kline, Austin Pendleton, Jenifer Lewis, Ato Essandoh, and Fred Weller. The show was directed by George C. Wolf, and written by Tony Kushner, with music by Jeanine Tesori.

She has performed on stage in Off-Broadway theatre including Samuel Beckett Theatre, Urban Stages, Bank Street Theatre, and Minetta Lane Theatre.

Show	Character	Director	Company	Venue	Ref
Washer/Dryer	Dr. Lee	Benjamin Haber Kamine	Ma-Yi Theater Company	Samuel Beckett Theatre	
Chimerica	Feng Meihui / Ming Xiaoli	David Muse	The Studio Theatre	The Studio Theatre	
Mother Courage and Her Children	Injured Farmer's Wife / Farmer's Wife	George C. Wolf	The Public	Delacorte Theatre	
2752	Unnamed	Benjamin Kamine	La MaMa	Umbria Playwrights Retreat	
Comfort Women	Unnamed	Frances Hill	Urban Stages	Urban Stages Theater	
Red	Sonya Wong Pickford	Blanka Zizka	Wilma Theater	The Wilma Theater	
Book of Days	Sharon Bates	Wendy Goldberg	Arena Stage	Arena Stage Fichandler Stage	
Barriers	Naima	Ashok Sinha		Here	
The Shanghai Gesture	Mother God Damn	Dan Wackerman	Peccadillo Theatre Company	The Bank Street Theatre	
The Trojan Women	Pallas Athena / Hecuba	JoAnne Akalaitis	Shakespeare Theatre Company	The Lansburgh Theatre	
Primary English Class	Mrs. Pong / Translator (Understudy)	Gerald Gutierrez,		Minetta Lane Theatre	

== Awards ==
- Disney/ABC Fellowship
- BlueCat Screen Writing Awards, Semi-finalist, for Ersatz
