= Sister Ping =

Chinese human smuggler (1949–2014)

- 鄭翠萍
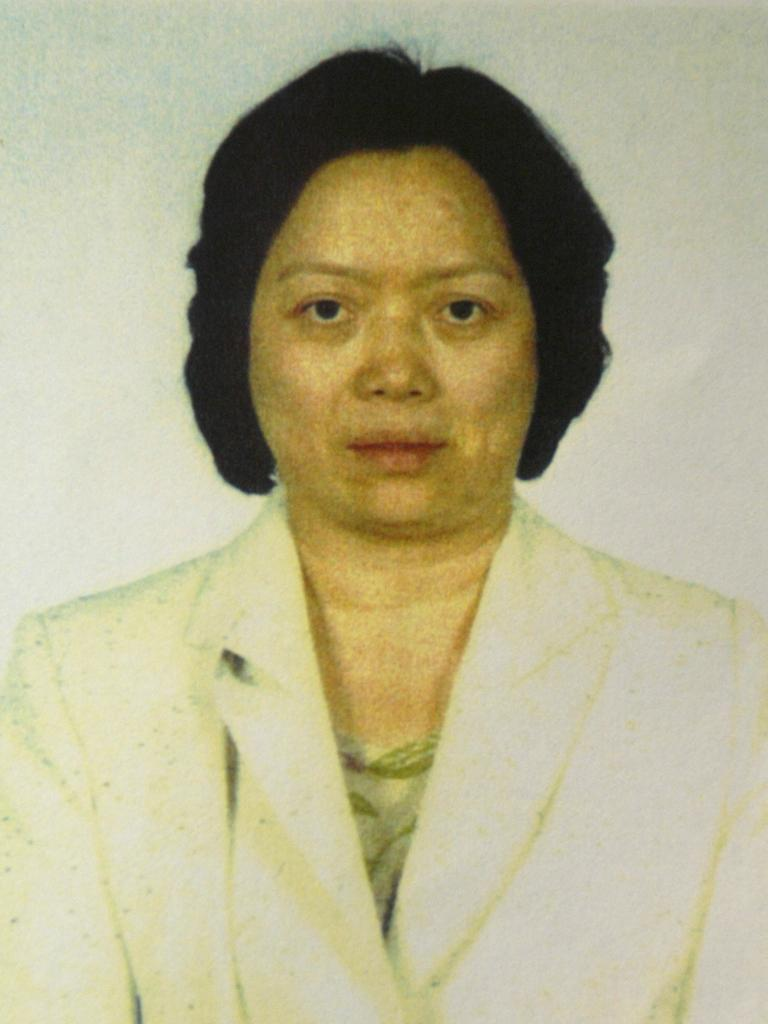
- Sister Ping, date unknown
- Born: Cheng Chui Ping; January 9, 1949; Shengmei, Fuzhou, China
- Died: April 24, 2014 (aged 65); Federal Medical Center Carswell, Texas, US
- Resting place: Kensico Cemetery
- Occupations: Red Guard leader, shopkeeper, human smuggler
- Years active: 1984 until 2000
- Organization: Fuk Ching (Snakeheads)
- Spouse: Cheung Yick
- Children: 4
- Status: Convicted
- Criminal charges: human trafficking, hostage taking, money laundering, trafficking in ransom proceeds
- Penalty: 35 years in prison

Cheng Chui Ping
- Traditional Chinese: 鄭翠萍
- Simplified Chinese: 郑翠萍
Transcriptions
Standard Mandarin
- Hanyu Pinyin: Zhèng Cuìpíng
- Wade–Giles: Cheng4 Ts'ui4-p'ing2
Yue: Cantonese
- Jyutping: zeng6 ceoi3 ping4

Sister Ping
- Chinese: 萍姐
Transcriptions
Standard Mandarin
- Hanyu Pinyin: Píng Jiě
- Wade–Giles: P'ing2 chieh3
Yue: Cantonese
- Jyutping: ping4 ze2

Cheng Chui Ping (traditional Chinese: 鄭翠萍; simplified Chinese: 郑翠萍; January 9, 1949 – April 24, 2014), also known as Sister Ping (Chinese: 萍姐), was a Chinese woman who ran a human smuggling operation bringing people from China into the United States between 1984 and 2000. Operating from Chinatown, Manhattan, Ping oversaw a snakehead smuggling ring which brought as many as 3,000 Chinese into the United States, earning her more than $40 million. The United States Department of Justice called Ping "one of the first, and ultimately most successful, alien smugglers of all time."

Born and raised in Fujian province, Ping moved to Hong Kong in 1974, and then New York City in 1981. She was arrested in Hong Kong in 2000 and extradited to the United States in 2003. In 2006, she was sentenced to 35 years in federal prison, and remained there until her death.

== Early life ==
Ping was born on January 9, 1949, in Shengmei, Mawei, Fuzhou, a poor farming village in northern Fujian, China. She was one of five children born to her father, Cheng Chai Leung, who was from Shengmei, and her mother, who was from a neighboring village. Ping was 10 months old when the People's Republic of China was established. Growing up, she attended the village elementary school and worked on the family farm, helping raise pigs and rabbits, chopping wood, and tending a vegetable garden. When she was twelve, she survived the capsizing of a rowboat in which she had been traveling to another village to cut wood for kindling. She recalled of the incident that all of the people in the boat who had been rowing and had been holding an oar when the boat turned over managed to survive, while "the two people who were lazy and sat back while others worked ended up dead. This taught me to work hard." During the Cultural Revolution, she became a leader of the Red Guard in her village.

When she was 15, her father left the family and traveled to the United States as a merchant marine crewman. He stayed in the U.S. for 13 years, working as a dish-washer and sending money home to the family every few months. He was apprehended by U.S. immigration authorities and deported back to China in 1977. When he returned to China, Ping's father entered into the people smuggling business.

Sister Ping married Cheung Yick, a man from a neighboring village, in 1969. They had a daughter, Cheung Hui, in 1973; Ping later had three sons. The family moved to Hong Kong in 1974, where Ping became a successful businesswoman and opened a factory in Shenzhen, China. In June 1981, with the help of an elderly couple, Ping successfully applied to be a nanny in New York. The family passed through Canada, and on 17 November 1981, settled in Chinatown, Manhattan, in the United States. They opened a shop, the Tak Shun Variety Store, which catered to homesick Fuzhounese immigrants. During her time in New York, Ping lived at 14 Monroe Street, Knickerbocker Village, a modest lower middle class development in Two Bridges, Manhattan.

== Smuggling business ==
=== Early career ===
Ping began her smuggling career in the early 1980s as a one-woman operation, smuggling handfuls of fellow villagers from China into the United States a few at a time by commercial airline using forged identification documents. She charged $35,000 or more to transport interested immigrants into the United States.

In the spring of 1989, evidence against Ping was gathered in a sting by the Royal Canadian Mounted Police at Toronto International Airport. Several months later, Ping was arrested and pleaded guilty to illegal human smuggling. She was sentenced to six months in prison in Butler County, Pennsylvania. As she spoke little English, she was isolated from other prisoners and readily agreed to provide a Chinese-speaking FBI agent with information on Chinatown's underworld, she received a reduced sentence and served four months.

Business picked up after the Tiananmen Square protests of 1989 when the U.S. government offered Chinese students present in the United States at the time the opportunity to stay. Thousands flooded into the country from abroad using false papers to establish a claim to residency under the new rule.

=== Mass operations by cargo ship ===
On June 6, 1993, the Golden Venture, a 147-foot (45 m) cargo ship, ran aground in Queens, New York, with 286 illegal immigrants on board. One of the criminal leaders, Guo Liang Chi, claimed Ping as an investor. However, there are doubts about Guo Liang Chi's claim because he wanted to blame another person to reduce his federal sentence on other crimes that he committed over the years. In December 1994, an indictment was brought before a Manhattan federal court, stating that Ping had smuggled around 3,000 Fujianese to the United States since 1984 with the help of the American-Chinese gang Fuk Ching. Sometimes hundreds of people were smuggled in at a time via cargo ship and imprisoned below deck for months at a time with little food and water. In 1998, one of the smaller boats Ping used for offloading customers from a larger vessel capsized off the coast of Guatemala, drowning 14.

=== International network and collections ===
Ping hired scores of people in several different countries to move her human cargo for her, hold them hostage until their smuggling fees were paid, and collect those fees from them. Sometimes her customers were lucky and arrived safely in the United States where they paid the exorbitant fees Ping charged, and were released.

To ensure her customers paid their smuggling fees, Ping hired armed thugs from the Fuk Ching, Chinatown's most vicious and feared gang, to transport and guard her customers in the United States. The presence of these gang members guaranteed that Ping got paid the $25,000 to $45,000 fee she demanded for the trip.

Ping also ran a money transmitting business out of her Chinatown variety store.

=== Scope and notoriety ===
Individuals who conducted such Chinese illegal human smuggling operations are known as "snakeheads" from the Chinese translation for human-smuggler. Almost all of the immigrants whom Ping harbored came from Fujian province. She was renowned as the most notorious snakehead, operating the largest, most sophisticated operation of its kind, which became international in scale. The U.S. Department of Justice declared at her sentencing that "Sister Ping is one of the first, and ultimately most successful, human smugglers of all time." It is estimated that Ping amassed around $40 million.

=== Legal pursuit ===
In 1994, Ping was invited to Beijing, China along with other overseas notables of Fujianese descent to celebrate an anniversary celebration of the Communist Party. She was arrested when she arrived but according to police and friends, she paid bribes to escape custody. Later in December 1994, Ping learned of the US indictment and she fled, returning to China where she continued her business.

The FBI and INS spent the following five years attempting to apprehend her, but she was believed to reside mainly in China, which does not have an extradition treaty with the United States. On April 17, 2000 Interpol searched passenger lists for flights from Hong Kong to New York, they found her son's name. More than 40 agents from the Hong Kong narcotics bureau waited at Hong Kong International Airport, apprehended her at around noon and she was fingerprinted and arrested. At the time Ping was carrying three passports, including a fake Belize one with her photo but in the name of Lilly Zheng. She fought extradition but was eventually sent back to New York in July 2003 and held at Metropolitan Detention Center in Brooklyn.

After a jury trial before the United States District Court for the Southern District of New York she was convicted in June 2005 on three separate counts, including one count of conspiring to commit illegal human smuggling, hostage taking, money laundering and trafficking in ransom proceeds and sentenced to 35 years in prison.

Ping was interviewed in Danbury in June 2013 and said, “Being locked up for over 10 years allowed me to think about my previous life, my heart calmed down and I started to feel that jail was the safest place for me. I keep telling myself not to think much about the future and live life by the moment." She also said "I cannot believe they jailed me for 35 years! 35 years! In a way I was killed by the FBI agents and tainted witnesses."

Ping served part of her sentence in Federal prison in Danbury, Connecticut (BOP #05117-055). In 2013, it was announced that Danbury would be reverted to a male-only facility. In the same year, Ping was diagnosed with pancreatic cancer and transferred to the Federal Medical Center, Carswell, in Texas, to receive cancer treatment.

== Death ==
Ping's health had deteriorated in prison, with high cholesterol and blood lipids; she lost 17 pounds in the last two years of her life. Ping died on April 24, 2014, aged 65, surrounded by her family at the Federal Medical Center, Carswell, in Texas.

Her funeral took place on May 23, 2014, at the Boe Fook Funeral Home on Canal Street in Manhattan with thousands of mourners.

Her body was laid to rest at Kensico Cemetery in Valhalla, New York.

== Cultural references ==
Ping and the Golden Venture are the subject of Patrick Radden Keefe's 2009 book, The Snakehead.

The Golden Venture disaster and the lives of some of the passengers are the subject of Peter Cohn's 2006 documentary Golden Venture.

The 2012 film Premium Rush contains an allusion to Ping. Set in Manhattan, the plot centers around the troubled delivery of a hawala ticket to a snakehead named “Sister Chen” in Chinatown.

The 2021 film Snakehead, written and directed by Evan Jackson Leong, was loosely inspired by Ping.
