= Tamatebako (origami) =

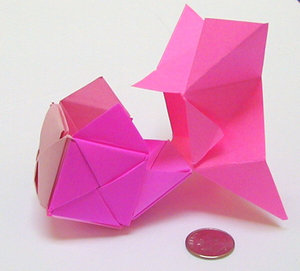
An unglued tamatebako coming apart

The Tamatebako (玉手箱) is an origami model named after the tamatebako of Japanese folk tale. It is a modular cube design that can be opened from any side. If more than one face of the model is opened, the cube falls apart and cannot easily be reconstructed. The model, and the directions for creating it, had been lost for centuries and only recently rediscovered.

Drawings from a three volume set of wood carvings, Ranma-Zushiki (『欄間図式』, "ranma sketches") published in 1743 by Ōoka Shunboku, featured a colored origami cube. In 1993, Yasuo Koyanagi identified the cube as the Tamatebako, and the model was published in the book "Koten-ni-miri-origami" by Satoshi Tagaki. The popular origami historian, Masao Okamura then was able to reconstruct the model, and by comparison to other traditional works, verify the model's authenticity.

== Basic folding instructions ==
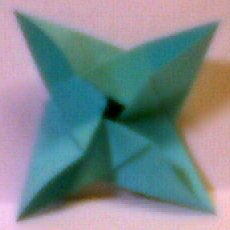
A pinwheel fold

Valley-fold a square into thirds between both pairs of edges, creating nine sub-squares. Cut a diagonal X across the entire center square, pinwheel-fold the outer edges, and fold the protruding pinwheel flaps inward, interleaving them to produce a multilayered square with the top woven together. Fold outward the triangular flaps cut from the center square. This creates one face of the cube; the entire cube requires six identical modules.

Closed tamatebako cube

For each module, tuck one opposing pair of cut flaps into the pockets at the base of the pinwheel, and insert the remaining pair of cut flaps into the pockets of two other faces to assemble the entire cube. The resulting tamatebako can be opened from any face by either unfolding the pinwheel or gently pulling one face completely off the rest of the cube.

== Variations ==
Tamatebako cube with glued flaps and all six faces open

The cube can also be assembled by gluing together the undersides of the flaps of adjacent faces. When the glue is dry, tuck the glued flaps into the pinwheel pockets in the same manner as above, with each face having one pair of flaps tucked into itself and the other two tucked into the adjacent faces. Like the original version, the glued cube can be opened from any face by unfolding its pinwheel, but will not fall apart if multiple faces are opened.

A more elaborate traditional version of the Tamatebako can be made in the form of a cuboctahedron, still using six square pinwheel faces as described above. All four of the cut center flaps from each pinwheel square are extended outward; each of the eight new faces is formed by overlapping one flap each from three adjacent faces to form an equilateral triangle. Originally, the overlapped triangle was glued together, although it is possible to construct a triangular face hinge that does not require glue.

The folding pattern for this form was documented by Isao Honda in 1933 alongside the simple cube. It was also documented by Harry Houdini as a "Japanese hexagon puzzle box" in 1922 without the simple cube version, in the company of several other traditional models which he learned from a Japanese acquaintance. Like the cube, this form can also be opened from any of the six square faces by unfolding each pinwheel, but will not fall apart if assembled with glue.

== Bibliography ==
- Ranma-Zushiki, Ōoka Shunboku, 1734
- Houdini's Paper Magic, Harry Houdini, 1922
- Koten-ni-miri-origami, Satoshi Tagaki, 1993
- Extreme Origami, Kunihiko Kasahara, 2001, ISBN 0-8069-8853-3
- The Art and Wonder of Origami, Kunihiko Kasahara, 2004, ISBN 978-1-59253-213-1

== See also ==
- Origami
- Pandora's box
