= Rona Gurkewitz =

American mathematician and computer scientist

Rona Gurkewitz is an American mathematician and computer scientist, known for her work on modular origami. She is a professor emerita of computer science at Western Connecticut State University, and the former head of the department of computer science there.

== Origami ==
Gurkewitz became interested in origami after meeting origami pioneer Lillian Oppenheimer at a dinner party and becoming a regular visitor to Oppenheimer's origami get-togethers. She has written several books on origami, exhibited works at international origami shows, supplied a piece for the set design of the premiere of the Rajiv Joseph play Animals Out of Paper, and has made modular origami quilts as well as polyhedra.

== Books ==
With retired mechanical engineer Bennett Arnstein, Gurkewitz is the coauthor of books including:

- 3D Geometric Origami: Modular Origami Polyhedra (Dover, 1996)
- Multimodular Origami Polyhedra: Archimedeans, Buckyballs and Duality (Dover, 2002)
- Beginner's Book of Modular Origami Polyhedra: The Platonic Solids (Dover, 2008)

With Arnstein and Lewis Simon, she is a coauthor of the second edition of the book Modular Origami Polyhedra (Dover, 1999), extended from the first edition by Arnstein and Simon.
