= Golden Venture =

Cargo ship carrying undocumented immigrants (1993)

Coordinates: 26°19′16.080″N 80°3′32.340″W

History
- Name: Golden Venture
- Launched: 1969
- Fate: Renamed as United Caribbean after 1993
- Name: United Caribbean
- Acquired: 1993
- Identification: IMO number: 7653698
- Fate: Sunk as an artificial reef by Palm Beach County on 22 August 2000

General characteristics
- Type: Cargo ship
- Tonnage: 198 GT; 550 DWT
- Length: 44.8 m (147 ft)
- Installed power: Single diesel engine
- Propulsion: Single shaft, single screw

Golden Venture was a 147-foot-long (45 m) cargo ship that ran aground on the beach at Fort Tilden on the Rockaway peninsula of Queens, New York, United States, on June 6, 1993, at around 2 a.m. The ship had 13 crew members who were smuggling 286 undocumented immigrants from China (mostly Fuzhou people from Fujian province) to the U.S. The ship had sailed from Bangkok, Thailand, stopped in Kenya, rounded the Cape of Good Hope, then headed northwest across the Atlantic Ocean to New York City on its four-month voyage. Ten people drowned in their attempts to flee the ship and get to shore in the United States when it ran aground.

The survivors were taken into custody by the Immigration and Naturalization Service (INS) and were held in various prisons throughout the U.S. while they applied for the right of asylum. Roughly 10% were granted asylum after U.S. Representative William Goodling entreated President Bill Clinton; minors were released, while about half the remainder were deported (some being accepted by South American countries). Some remained in immigration prison for years fighting their cases, the majority of which were held in York, Pennsylvania. The final 52 persons were released by President Clinton on February 27, 1997, after four years in prison.

This case was an early test of the system of detaining asylum-seekers in prisons, a practice that continues in the U.S., Australia, and the United Kingdom. It was also notable because some detainees created more than 10,000 folk art sculptures or Chinese paper folding, papier-mâché, and recycled materials while in York County Prison; these were later exhibited throughout the U.S. and sold to offset legal costs.

== The journey ==
The immigrants paid $40,000 on average in whole or in part before departing China on foot through Myanmar then to Bangkok where they were kept in a staging house for two months. In February 1993, the ship departed, and on its way stopped in Mombasa, Kenya, to pick up passengers left stranded by a previous boat that had run aground there. Rounding the Cape of Good Hope, the ship was caught in a hurricane but survived and headed toward Boston.

The immigrants were held in the cramped hold of the freighter and were forced to live on a diet of rice, peanuts, dirty water, and spoiled food as it sailed on its 4-month voyage to New York City. There were beatings by the gang enforcers on board and several incidents of rape.

The ship was supposed to rendezvous with smaller vessels before landing to help move some of the immigrants and lessen the load. This did not happen due to the gang in charge being arrested around that time. The smugglers on board directed the ship to New York City. Golden Venture ran aground on the beach at Fort Tilden in Rockaway Beach in Queens, New York, on June 6, 1993, at around 2 a.m. after a mutiny of sorts by one smuggler who had locked up the captain. Initial reports counted 7 deaths among those who attempted to swim to ashore: the total number was later revised to 10.

== Survivors in INS custody ==
The survivors, 262 men, 24 women, and 14 children, were taken into custody by the Immigration and Naturalization Service (INS)—six escaped—and were held in various prisons throughout the U.S. while they applied for the right of asylum. The INS was unprepared for the number of refugees, and some were sent as far as Bakersfield, California. Roughly 10% were granted asylum after Pennsylvania congressman William Goodling entreated President Bill Clinton; minors were released, while about half the remainder were deported (some being accepted by South American countries).

Some remained in immigration prison for years fighting their cases, 119 in York, Pennsylvania in a medium security prison. It was argued that this tactic was a method of isolating the prisoners from lawyers and rights groups. During detention, they turned to traditional Chinese paper folding, Zhezhi, creating sculptures for their attorneys and later in organized workshops. They produced “freedom birds,” replicas of the Golden Venture, and American symbols using folded paper and papier-mache. Cindy Lobach organized auctions and exhibitions to raise funds for legal defense, with early sales in 1994 raising $15,000 and later gallery exhibitions on Madison Avenue. Over three and a half years, detainees produced more than 10,000 sculptures, raising over $100,000. A number of individuals in York volunteered their time as legal aid, and in the last years there was a weekly vigil held outside the prison.

Goodling, and later Representative Chris Smith of New Jersey, would introduce private members' bills in Congress with the aim of getting legal residency status for the survivors. While pending, the bills protected the survivors from deportation. The final 39 detainees were released from York County Prison on February 26, 1997, nearly four years after their voyage, on parole rather than full asylum, leaving them at risk of deportation at anytime.

== Criminal leaders ==
Lee Peng Fei, a Taiwanese citizen also known as Lee Hsiao Kuang and Char Lee, was described at his trial as the 'mastermind' behind Golden Venture. He had not been on board the ship but had ordered the grounding from his Chinatown apartment. He was arrested in Thailand and later sentenced to 20 years in prison.

One of those behind Golden Venture was a Chinese gang leader named Guo Liang Chi, known mainly by his street name of Ah Kay. He was the leader of the Fuk Ching gang, which up to early 1993, had been the most powerful Asian gang in New York City. A Chinese gangster who smuggled people to other countries, or a snakehead, he also had a reputation as a ruthless gangster who tortured and killed numerous people throughout his career. Kay was arrested in Hong Kong and eventually extradited to the U.S.. Federal investigators acknowledged that they were less interested in prosecuting Guo than in hearing what he had to say. After he cooperated with the US government in at least 15 different federal criminal cases over a period of many years, including the prosecution of 35 Chinatown gang members, he eventually received a light sentence.

By contrast, on June 22, 2005, Cheng Chui Ping (known within some communities as "Sister Ping" or "Big Sister Ping") was convicted for people smuggling and for money laundering from this case. Ah Kay testified against her during her May–June 2005 trial. Cheng became a snakehead, primarily as an investor, charging up to US$40,000 per person for the voyage from Asia to New York City in the suffocating hold of the rogue vessel. Although Cheng provided cash to buy the aging vessel in Thailand, trial evidence showed that she did not view Golden Venture's voyage as an important business deal, even though the gross take for all involved would have been around $8.5 million – if all of the immigrants aboard had paid or been ransomed by their families. She owned restaurants, a clothing store, real estate in Chinatown, apartments in Hong Kong, and a farm in South Africa. Evidence revealed that her main, multimillion-dollar business was an underground banking network that stretched from New York to Thailand, Singapore, Hong Kong, and China. On March 17, 2006, she was sentenced to the maximum of 35 years in federal prison despite her protests that she was forced to carry out the work by Triad gangs. Judge Reena Raggi pointed out the inhumane travel conditions forced on the immigrants and her use of gangsters to collect debts and ransoms in justifying the sentence.

== Aftermath ==
Renamed United Caribbean and used for a while as a cargo vessel in the Caribbean, the ship was later purchased by Palm Beach County for $60,000 and deliberately sunk August 22, 2000 as an artificial reef in 70 feet of water about one mile off the south coast of Florida near Boca Raton Inlet. The ship, which had been built in 1969, became part of the Palm Beach Artificial Reef Program. This wreck is a scuba diving destination and has now broken into three pieces, courtesy of the 2004 hurricanes Frances and Jeanne.

== Depictions and references in media ==
- Chang-rae Lee's 1995 novel Native Speaker includes scenes based on the Golden Venture.
- The novel Flower Net (1997) by Lisa See.
- Patrick Radden Keefe's 2009 book, The Snakehead, along with his 2006 article on the same subject for The New Yorker, centers on the Golden Venture incident as well as the trials of Sister Ping and other snakeheads
- Lisa Hsiao Chen's 2022 novel Activities of Daily Living includes discussion of the Golden Venture.
- Golden Venture (2006), a documentary focused on the survivors, was directed by Peter Cohn and was shown at the Tribeca Film Festival.

== See also ==
- Illegal immigration to the United States
- Pacific Solution
- Fuzhounese Americans
- East Wood affair
