= Chinese paper folding =

Chinese art form

Zhezhi
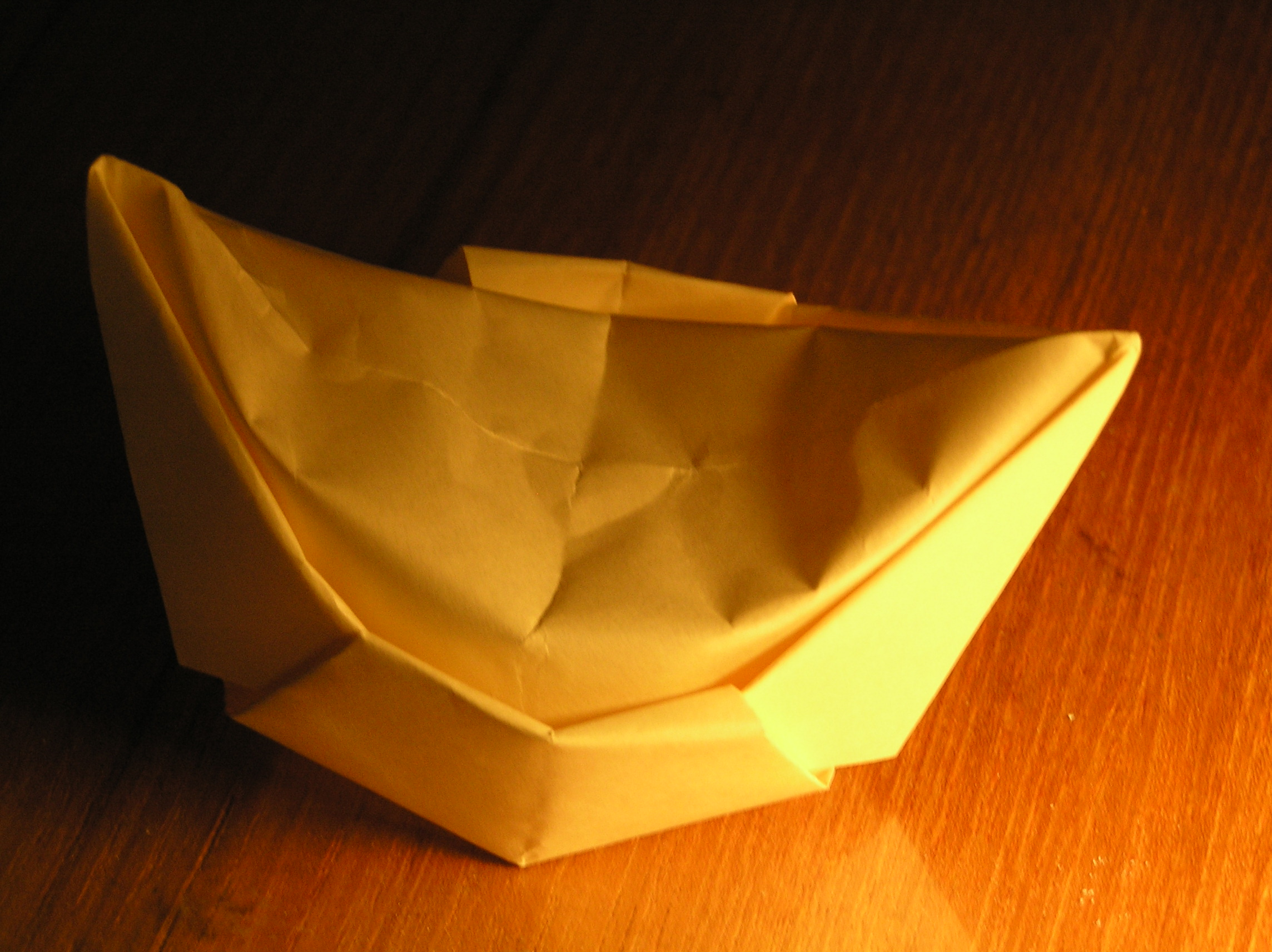
- Paper folded into the shape of a sycee, a Chinese gold ingot
- Chinese: 摺紙
Transcriptions
Standard Mandarin
- Hanyu Pinyin: zhézhǐ
Hakka
- Romanization: chap chṳ́
Yue: Cantonese
- Yale Romanization: jip jí
- Jyutping: zip3 zi2
Southern Min
- Hokkien POJ: chih-chóa

Chinese paper folding, or zhezhi (摺紙), is the art of paper folding that originated in medieval China.

The work of 20th-century Japanese paper artist Akira Yoshizawa widely popularized the Japanese word origami; however, in China and other Chinese-speaking areas, the art is referred to by the Chinese name, zhezhi. Traditional Chinese paper folding concentrates mainly on objects like boats or hats rather than the animals and flowers of Japanese origami. A recent innovation is from the Golden Venture migrants where large representational objects are made from modular forms.

== History ==
Paper was first invented by Cai Lun during the Eastern Han dynasty era. In the 6th century, Buddhist monks carried paper to Japan. The earliest document showing paper folding is a picture of a small paper boat in an edition of Tractatus de sphaera mundi from 1490 by Johannes de Sacrobosco. However it is very likely that paper folding originated much earlier than that in China and Japan for ceremonial purposes. In China, traditional funerals include burning folded paper, most often representations of gold nuggets (yuanbao). This practice probably started when papers gradually became popular and cheaper in China, and it seems to have become quite common during the Song dynasty (905–1125 CE). In Japan origami butterflies were used during the celebration of Shinto weddings to represent the bride and groom, so ceremonial paperfolding had probably already become a significant aspect of Japanese ceremony by the Heian period (794–1185) of Japanese history.

=== Significant early publications ===
Maying Soong's 1948 book, The Art of Chinese Paper Folding, helped popularise recreational paper folding in the 20th century, and was possibly the first to distinguish the difference between Chinese versus Japanese paper folding – where the Chinese focus primarily on inanimate objects, such as boats or pagoda, the Japanese include representations of living forms, such as the crane. It contains a number of simple traditional designs, some of which are also found in the traditions of other countries. A number of the models are folded from the blintz base, a form also common in traditional European and Japanese paper folding. The Old Scholar's Hat is among the old Chinese models found in this book. and the main quote of this book.

== Three dimensional origami ==
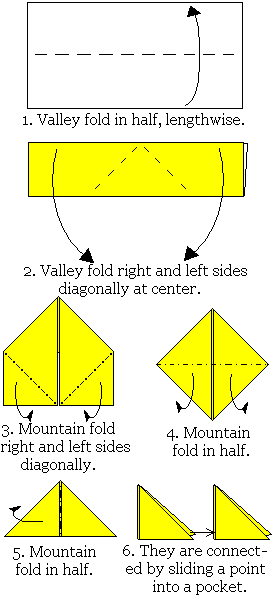
How the Golden Venture modular units are made.

In 1993, a group of Chinese refugees were detained on the ship Golden Venture and held in an American prison, where they began making elaborate models combining traditional Chinese modular paperfolding (utilizing materials such as magazine covers) with a form of papier-mâché (using toilet tissue); these models were given to those helping the refugees and sold at charity fundraisers. Media coverage of the refugees helped popularize traditional Chinese modular folding worldwide, which became known as "Golden Venture folding".

This type of modular folding is often done with Chinese paper money. Triangles are folded from multiple pieces of 1:2 aspect ratio paper, and connected by inserting a flap of one triangle into a pocket on the next. Popular subjects include pineapples, swans, and ships. This form of modular origami is commonly referred to as "3D origami".

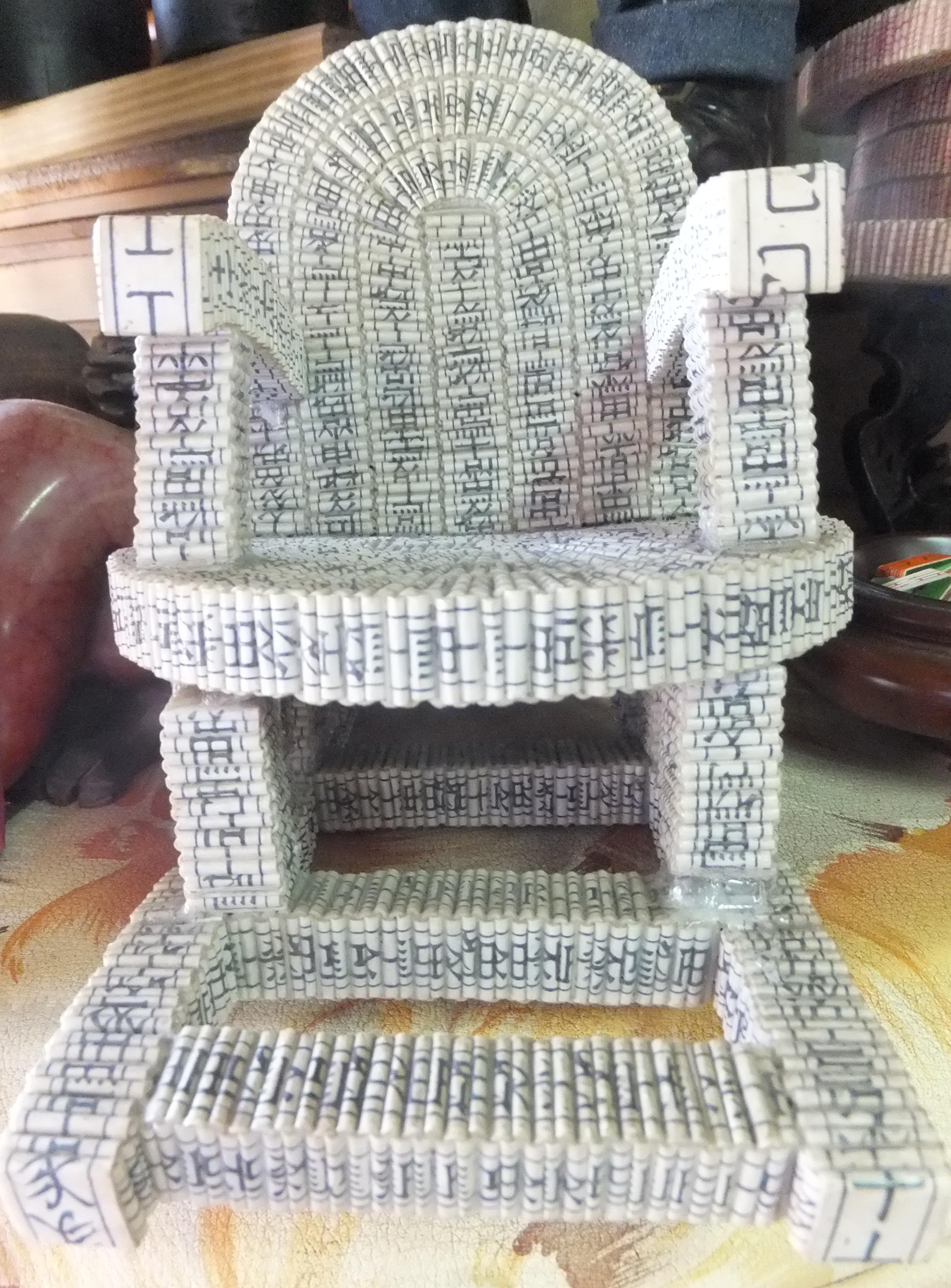
3D origami made of four color cards

== See also ==
- Chinese art
- Chinese folk art
- Chinese paper cutting
- History of origami
