= Tomoko Fuse =

Japanese origami artist

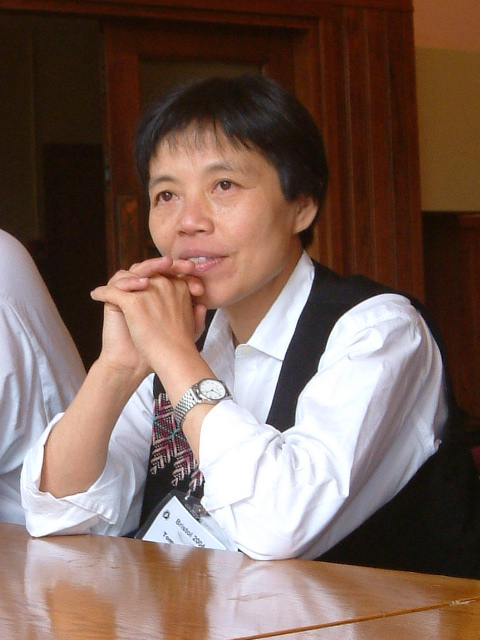
- Tomoko Fuse. In 2004, in Bristol.
- Born: 布施知子(ふせ ともこ); 1951 (age 74–75); Niigata prefecture

Tomoko Fuse (布施 知子, Fuse Tomoko, born in Niigata, 1951) is a Japanese origami artist and author of numerous books on the subject of modular origami, and is by many considered as a renowned master in the discipline.

Fuse first learned origami while in the hospital as a child. When she was 19 years old, she studied for two and a half years with origami master Toyoaki Kawai. She started publishing origami books in 1981, and has since published more than 60 books (plus overseas editions) as of 2006. She has created numerous origami designs, including boxes, kusudama, paper toys, masks, modular polyhedra, as well as other geometric forms and objects, such as origami tessellations, with publications in Japanese, Korean and English. She now resides with her husband Taro Toriumi, a respected woodblock printmaker and etcher, in rural Nagano prefecture, Japan.

Unit Origami: Multidimensional Transformations, the English language edition of her seminal modular origami inventions, may be considered the classic text on modular origami available in the English language.

== Publications ==
In English:

- Spiral: Origami/Art/Design, Viereck Verlag, 2012, ISBN 978-3-941327-06-1
- Floral Origami Globes, Japan Publications Trading, May 18, 2007, ISBN 978-4-88996-213-0
- Origami Rings & Wreaths: A Kaleidoscope of 28 Decorative Origami Creations, Japan Publications Trading, Nov 2007 ISBN 978-4-88996-223-9
- Kusudama Origami, Japan Publications, Sep 2002, ISBN 978-4-88996-087-7
- Fabulous Origami Boxes, Japan Publications, July 1998 ISBN 978-0-87040-978-3
- Joyful Origami Boxes, Japan Publications, March 1996, ISBN 0-87040-974-3
- Quick and Easy Origami Boxes, Japan Publications 1994, ISBN 0-87040-939-5
- Unit Origami: Multidimensional Transformation, Japan Publications, April 1990, ISBN 978-0-87040-852-6
- Origami Boxes: Moribana Style, Japan Publications, June 1975, ISBN 978-0-87040-821-2
- Origami Boxes, Japan Publications, July 1989, ISBN 0-87040-821-6
- Tomoko Fuse's Origami Boxes, Tuttle Publications, April 2018, ISBN 978-0-80485-006-3
- The Complete Book of Origami Polyhedra, Tuttle Publications, January 2022, ISBN 978-4-80531-594-1

In Japanese:

- Easy Origami to Enliven Your Life (Kurashi o Irodoru Raku Raku no Origami) Ishizue Publishers (July 1996), ISBN 978-4-900747-10-4
- Yunnito Origami (Unit Origami), Chikuma Shobo Publishers (December 1983), ISBN 4480040781
- Beautiful Origami Boxes 2, Nihonvogue Company, Japan, 2014, 手づくりタウン│日本ヴォーグ社, ISBN 978-4-529-05285-6
- I Love Origami: The Mask, Origami House, 1997, ISBN 0356846040, ISBN 9780356846040
- Unit Origami Fantasy, 2010, ISBN 978-4817081582

In Italian:

- Origami Modulare (Italian version of Japanese Yunnito Origami), Il Castello Publishers, (1988)
