= Kusudama =

Form of origami

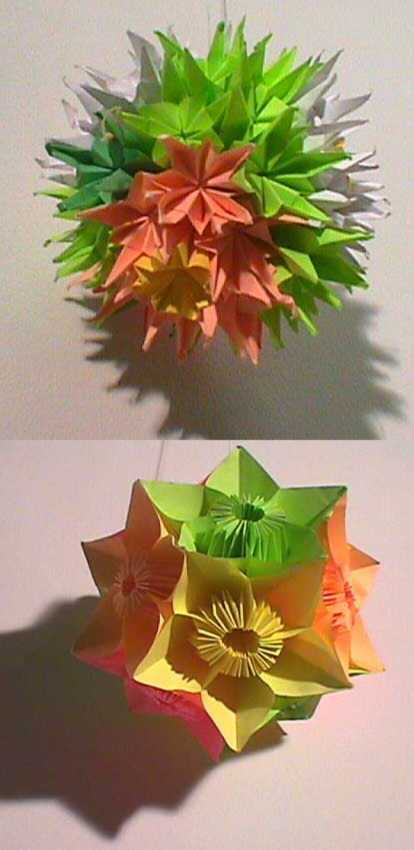
Two variations of kusudama. The kusudama in the lower photo is not threaded together.

The kusudama (薬玉; lit. 'medicine ball') is a paper model that is usually (although not always) created by sewing multiple identical pyramidal units together using underlying geometric principles of polyhedra to form a spherical shape. Alternatively, the individual components may be glued together. A tassel is occasionally attached to the bottom for decoration.

== Form ==
The kusudama is important in origami. Traditional kusudama can be made from origami flowers, such as the traditional origami lily. Instead of using string, many modern origami kusudama take the form of modular origami, where folded units are typically assembled by inserting flaps into pockets of adjacent units.

Although some origami purists frown upon threading or gluing the units together, others recognize that early traditional Japanese origami often used both cutting (see thousand origami cranes or senbazuru) and pasting, and respect kusudama as an ingenious traditional paper folding craft in the origami world.

Modern origami masters such as Tomoko Fuse have created new kusudama designs that are entirely assembled without cutting, glue, or thread except as a hanger.

== History ==
The term kusudama originates from ancient Japanese culture, where they were used for incense and potpourri; possibly originally being actual bunches of flowers or herbs. The word itself is a combination of two Japanese words kusuri ("medicine") and tama ("ball"). They are now typically used as decorations, or as gifts.

== Waritama ==
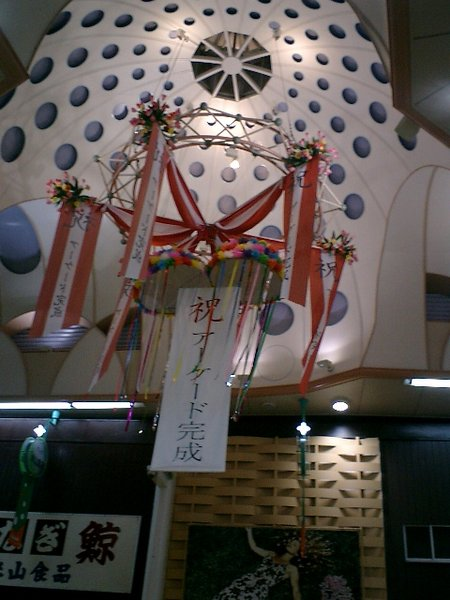
A waritama being opened to commemorate the completion of the Senbayashi Shopping Arcade in Osaka

Kusudama can also be used to refer to a type of decoration that is displayed and split open for celebrations. This decoration is more specifically called waritama (割り玉; lit. split ball). Waritama are large, spherical decorations that split in half to release confetti, streamers, balloons, etc. They can be used for a variety of events, including school events, graduation ceremonies, enterprise founding anniversaries, and sports competitions.

An emoji depicting a waritama, called Confetti Ball (🎊), was introduced with the October 2010 release of Unicode 6.0. It is the Emoticons Unicode block: U+1F38A 🎊 CONFETTI BALL.

== See also ==
- Modular origami
