= Guo Liang Chi =

Convicted Chinese gang leader

Guo Liang Chi (Chinese: 郭良琪; pinyin: Guō Liángqí, born 1966), also known in Cantonese as Kwok Lung-kee or Kwok Ling-kay and his nickname Ah Kay, is a Chinese criminal who was charged and convicted by US federal authorities for murder and human trafficking. He was a leader of the Fuk Ching gang, one of the Snakehead. He was arrested in British Hong Kong in 1994 and extradited to the US.

Guo was born in Fujian. He went to the United States via Ecuador in 1981. He had ordered the January 1994 killing in New York of two subordinates who were suspected to be planning on creating a breakaway faction. He was tricked into confessing the details over the phone by an FBI informant, and later led to a restaurant in Hong Kong where he was arrested.

Following Guo's arrest, federal authorities made 14 subsequent arrests over the next few days in New York of people suspected of being involved in the gang.

He has led Fuk Ching since 1989 and in the early 90s smuggled hundreds of people into the United States. He was suspected of being an organizer of the Golden Venture ship which ran ashore in Queens.
