= Modular origami =

Multi-stage paper folding technique

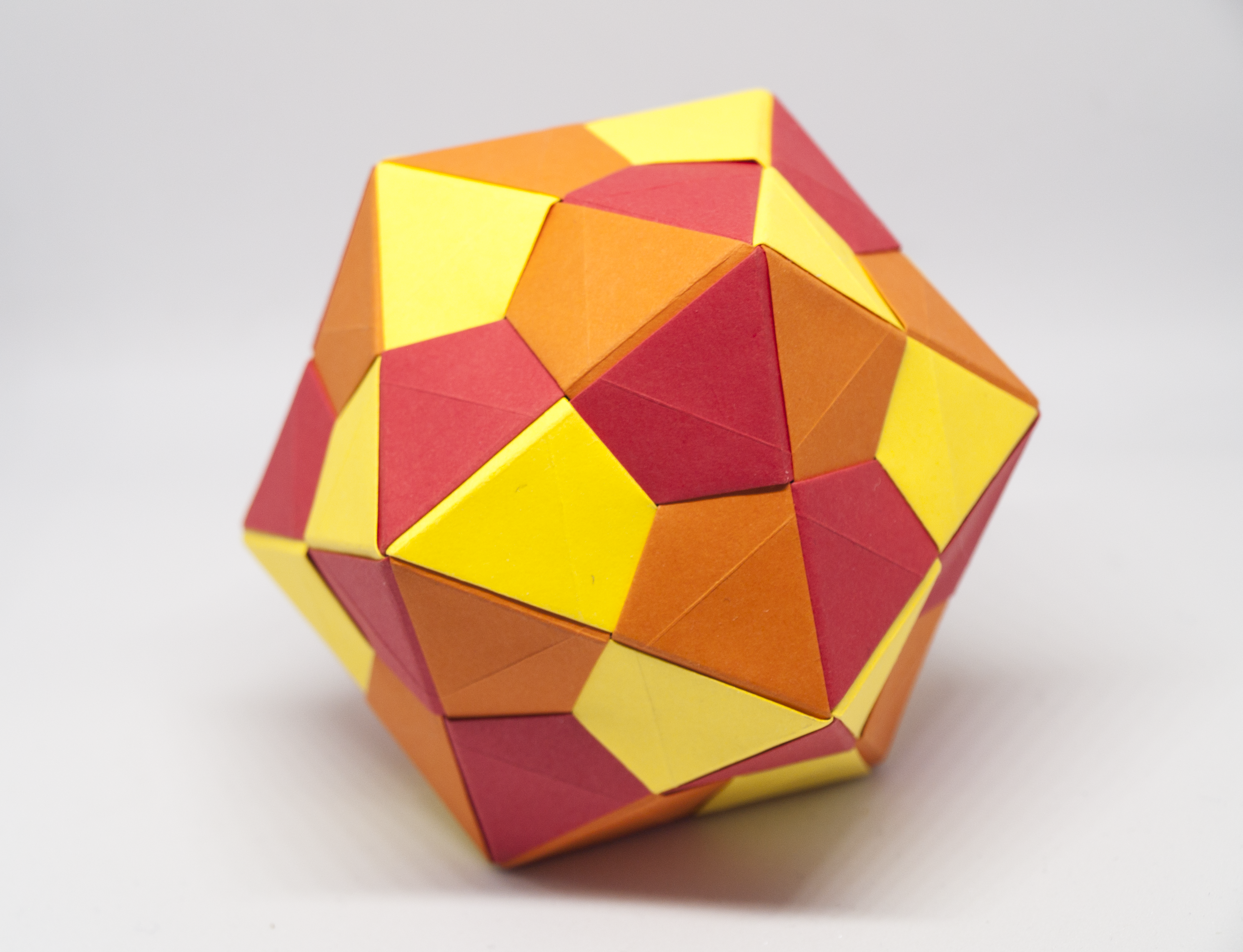
Triangle Edge Icosahedron designed by Bennett Arnstein. Diagrammed in the book 3-D Geometric Origami: Modular Polyhedra (1995)

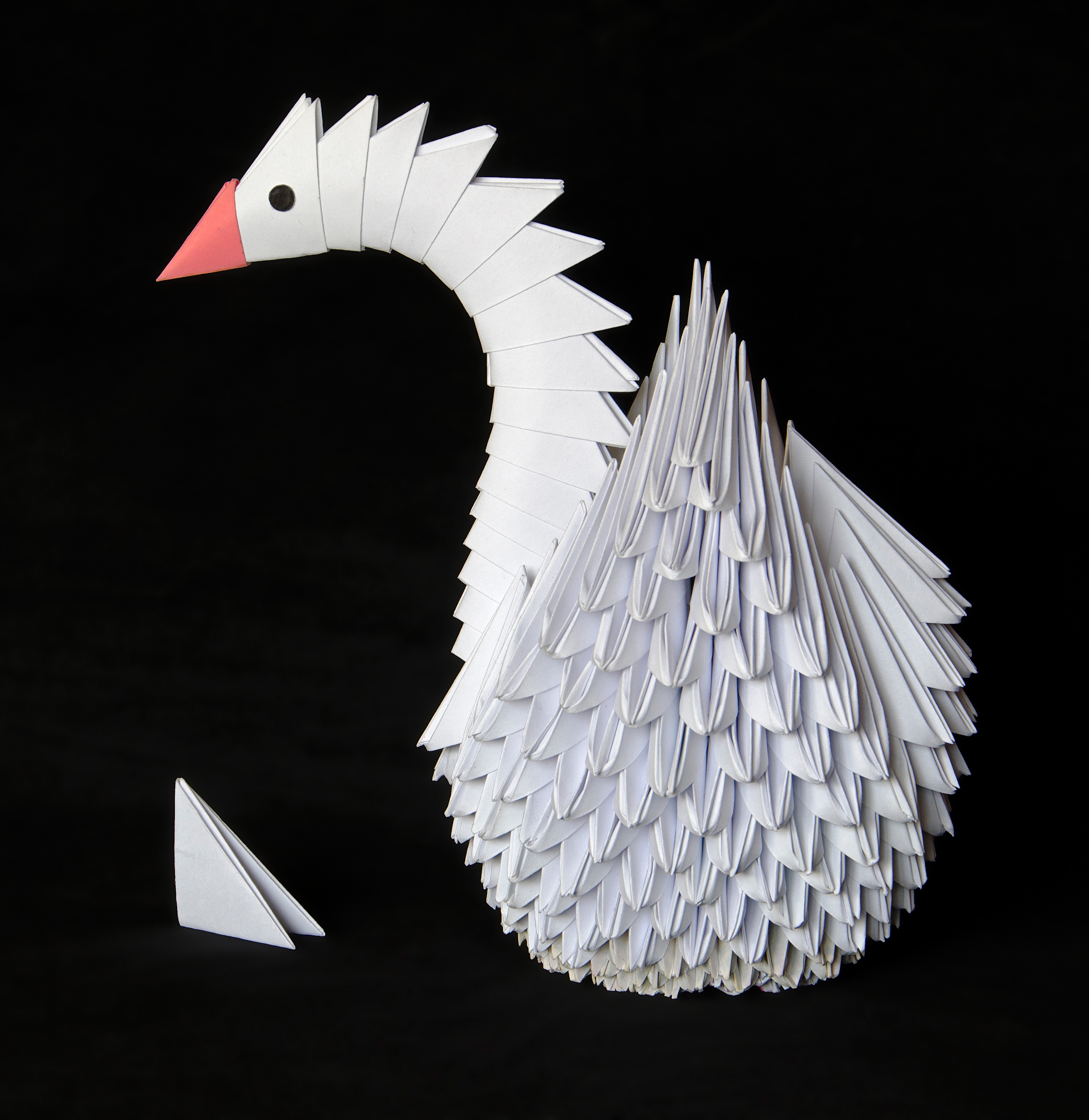
An example of golden venture folding.

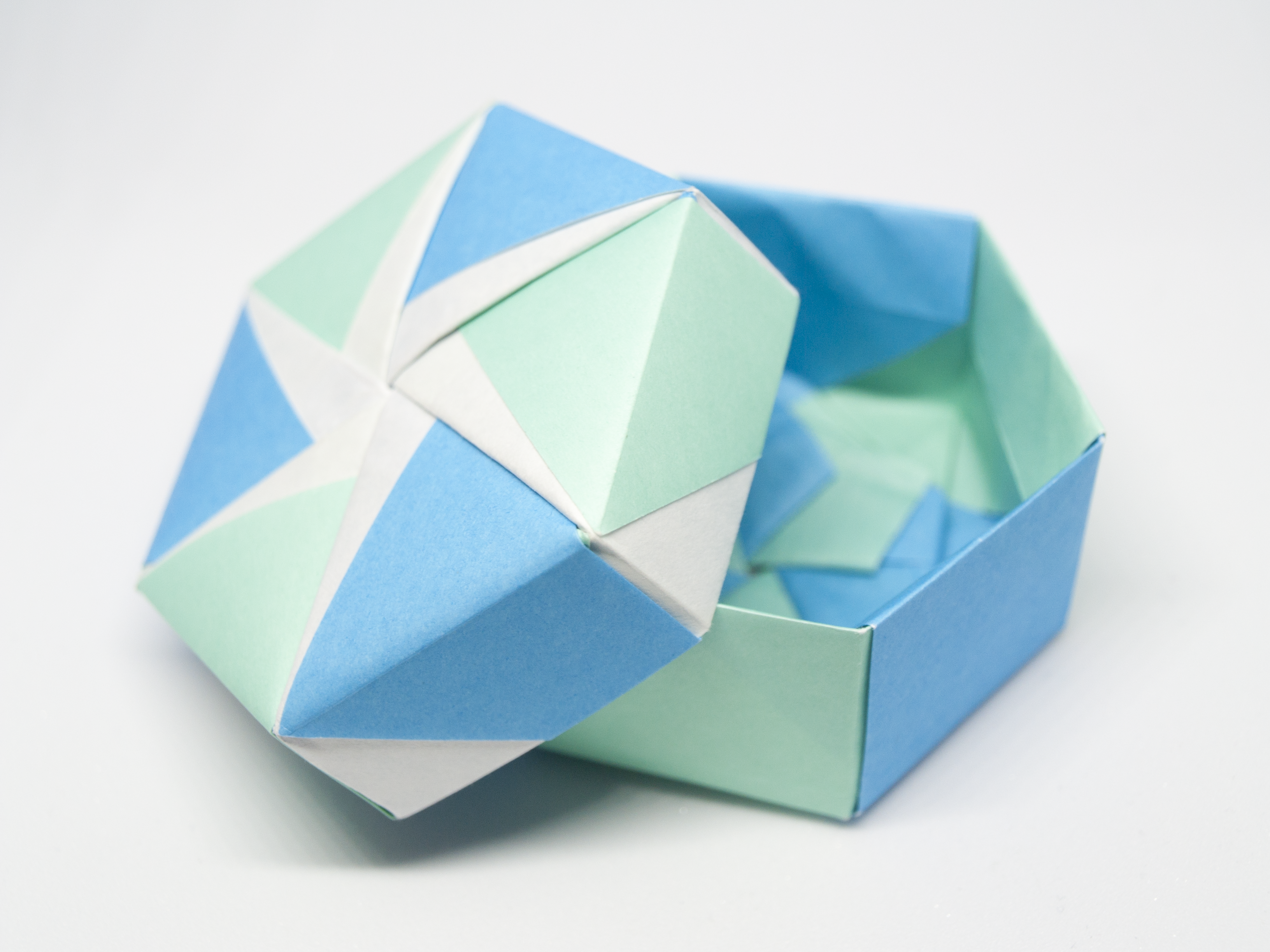
Modular origami hexagonal box with six-petal lid. Designed by Tomoko Fuse.

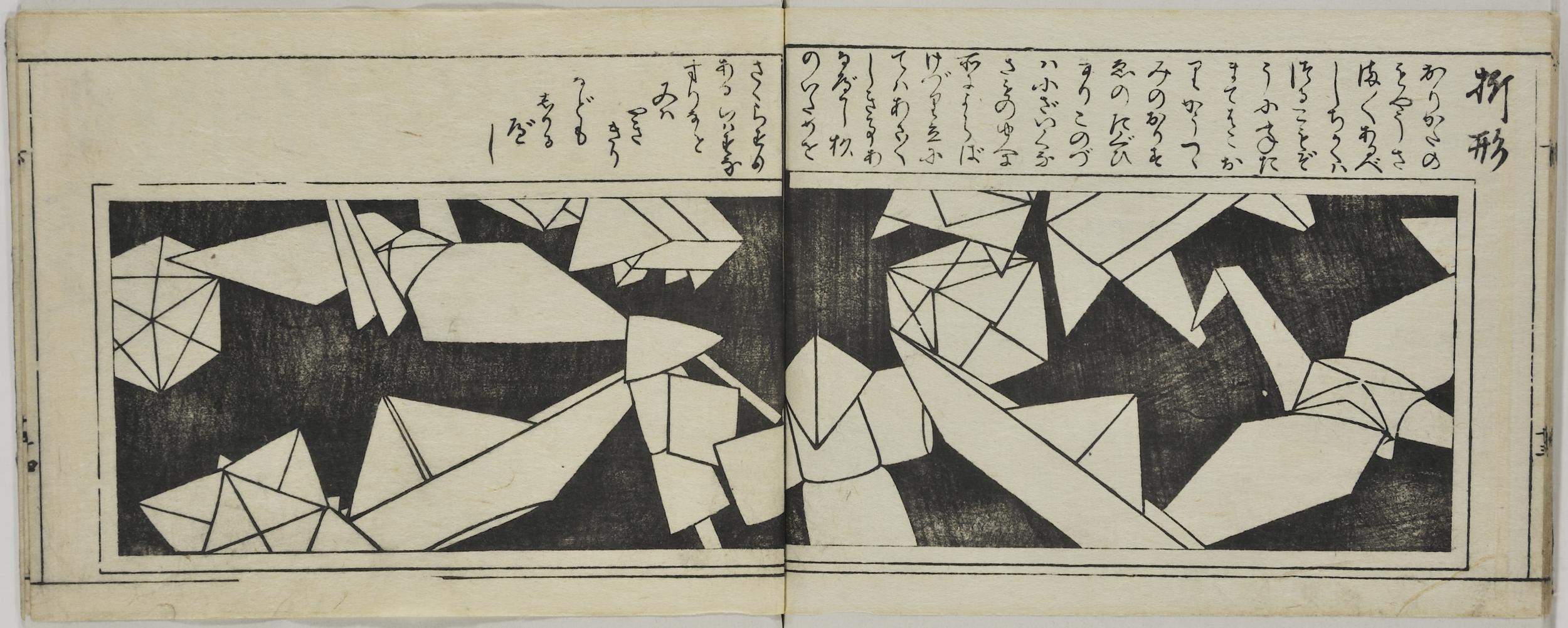
The page from Ranma zushiki 欄間図式 Volume 3 (1734) where modular origami models are depicted.

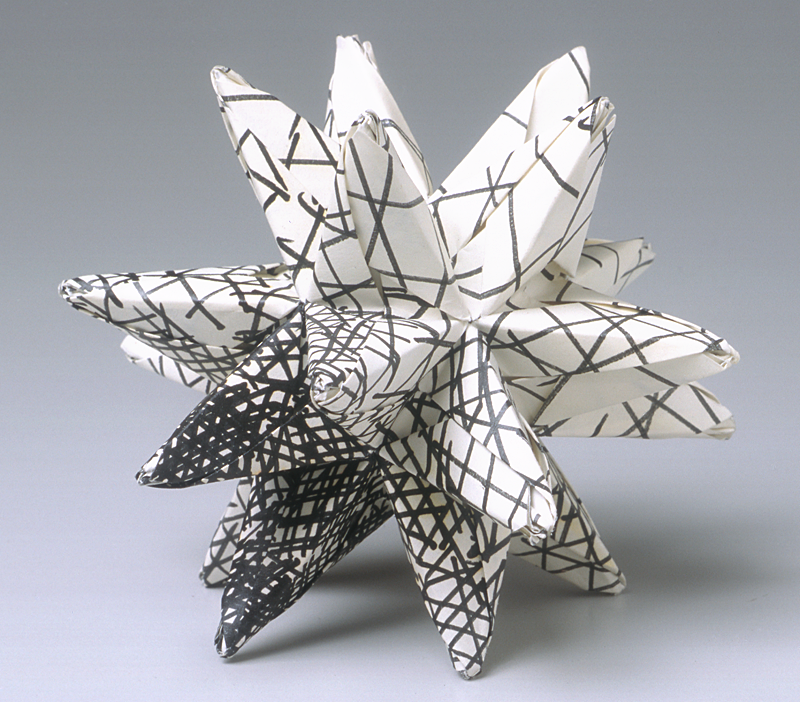
A stellated icosahedron made from custom papers

Modular origami or unit origami is a multi-stage paper folding technique in which individual modules or units are created out of sheets of paper and assembled into a flat shape or three-dimensional structure. This is usually done by inserting flaps into pockets created by the folding process, which create tension or friction and hold the model together. Some assemblies can be somewhat unstable when adhesives or string are not used.

== Definition and restrictions ==
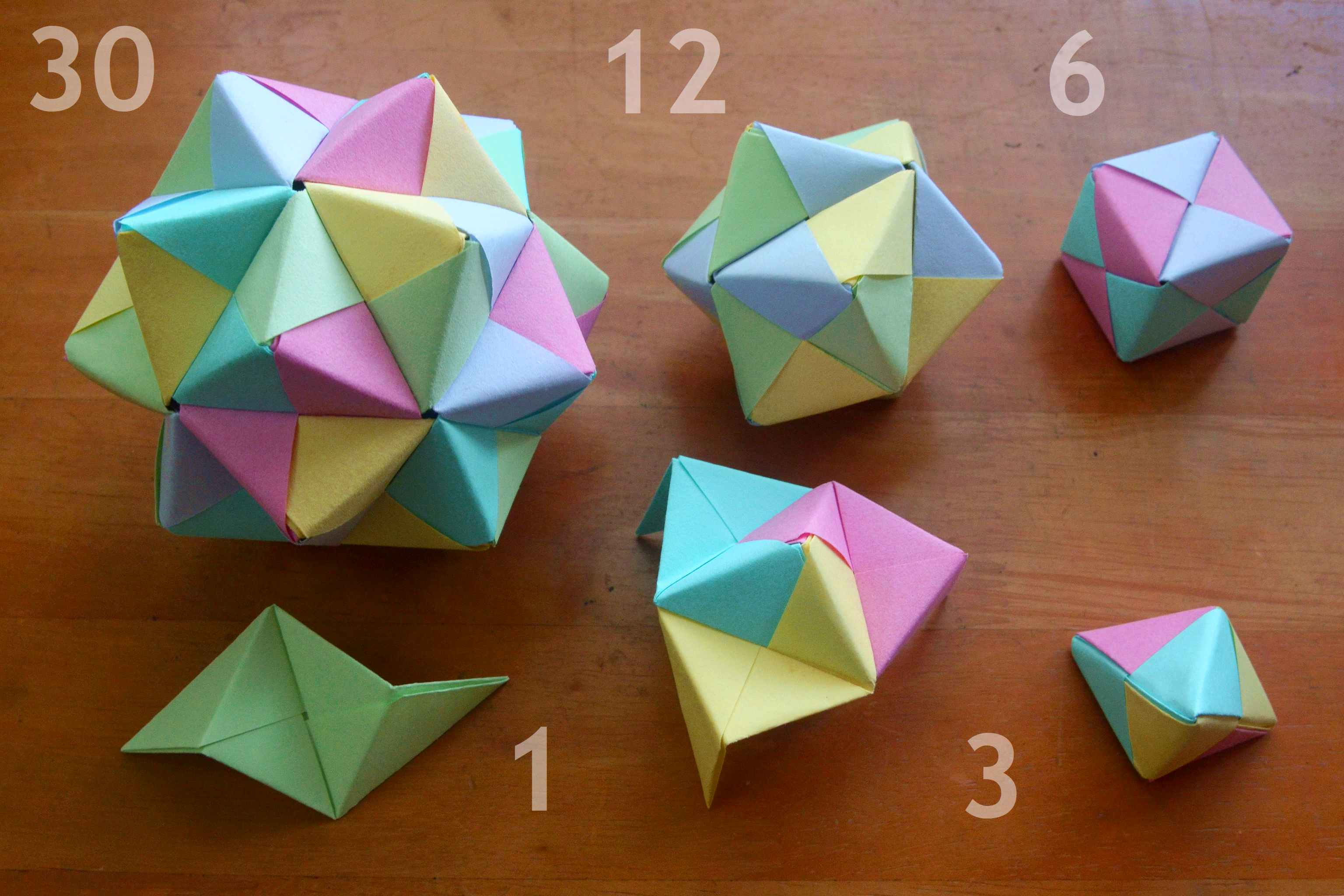
Models made from the indicated number of Sonobe units.

Modular origami can be classified as a subset of multi-piece origami, since the rule of restriction to one sheet of paper is abandoned. However, all the other rules of origami still apply, so the use of glue, thread, or any other fastening that is not a part of the sheet of paper is generally unacceptable in modular origami.

Not all multi-piece origami is modular, as modular origami must involve linking identical copies of a module in a symmetrical or repeating fashion. However, linking units, which are hidden from sight to hold parts of the construction together are acceptable. Any other usage of non-identical modules are generally discouraged.

== History ==
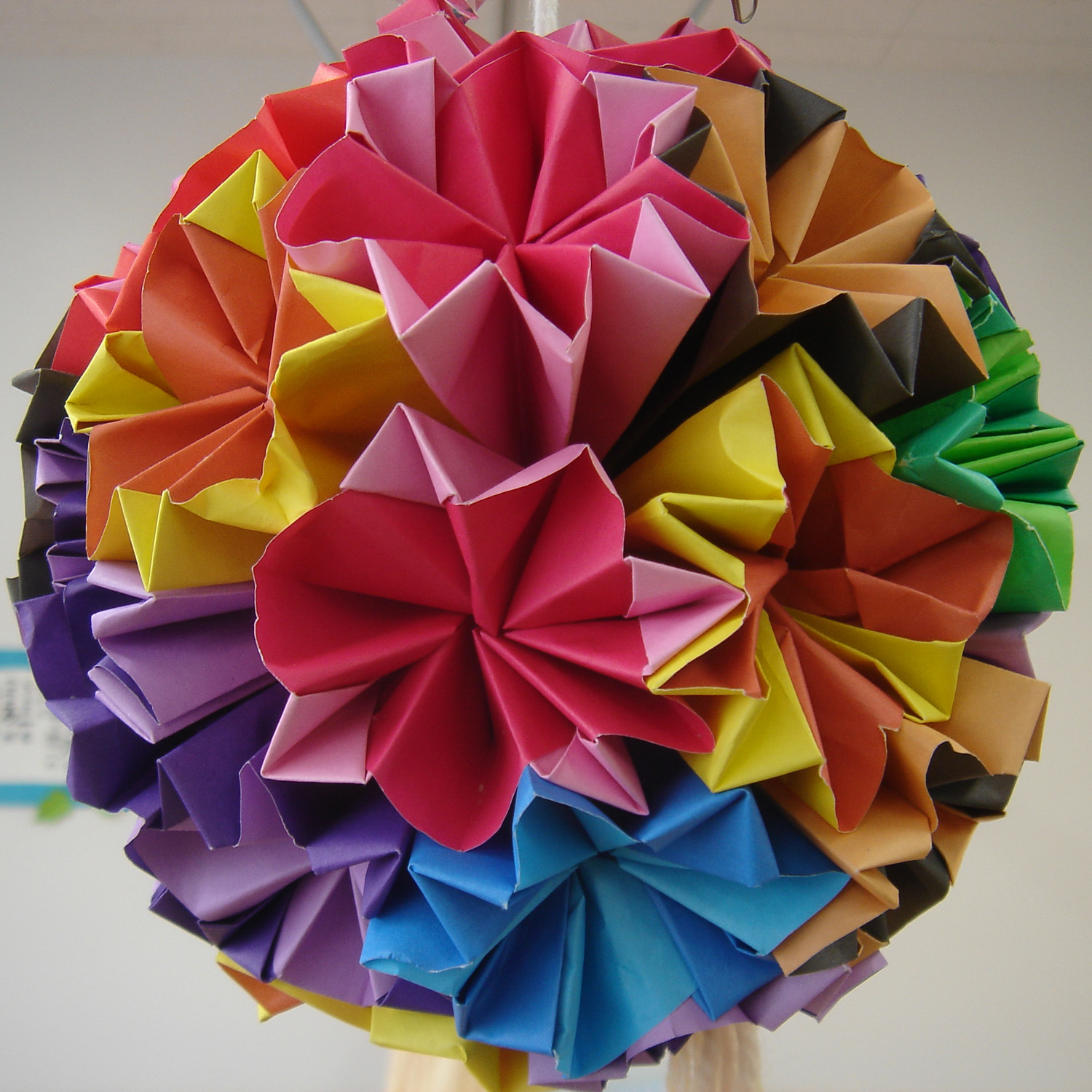
A kusudama, the traditional Japanese precursor to modular origami

The first historical evidence for a modular origami design comes from a Japanese book by Hayato Ohoka published in 1734 called Ranma Zushiki. It contains a print that shows a group of traditional origami models, one of which is a modular cube. The cube is pictured twice (from slightly different angles) and is identified in the accompanying text as a tamatebako (magic treasure chest).

Isao Honda's World of Origami (published in 1965) appears to have the same model, where it is called a "cubical box". The six modules required for this design were developed from the traditional Japanese paperfold commonly known as the menko. Each module forms one face of the finished cube.

There are several other traditional Japanese modular designs, including balls of folded paper flowers known as kusudama, or medicine balls. These designs are not integrated and are commonly strung together with thread. The term kusudama is sometimes inaccurately used to describe any three-dimensional modular origami structure resembling a ball.

There are also a few modular designs in the Chinese paperfolding tradition, notably the pagoda (from Maying Soong) and the lotus made from Joss paper.

Most traditional designs are however single-piece and the possibilities inherent in the modular origami idea were not explored further until the 1960s when the technique was re-invented by Robert Neale in the US and later by Mitsunobu Sonobe in Japan. The 1970s saw a sudden period of interest and development in modular origami as its own distinct field, leading to its present status in origami folding. One notable figure is Steve Krimball, who discovered the potential in Sonobe's cube unit and demonstrated that it could be used to make alternative polyhedral shapes, including a 30-piece ball.

Since then, the modular origami technique has been popularized and developed extensively, and now there have been thousands of designs developed in this repertoire.

Notable modular origami artists include Robert Neale, Mitsunobu Sonobe, Tomoko Fuse, Kunihiko Kasahara, Tom Hull, Heinz Strobl, Rona Gurkewitz, Meenakshi Mukerji, and Ekaterina Lukasheva.

== Types ==
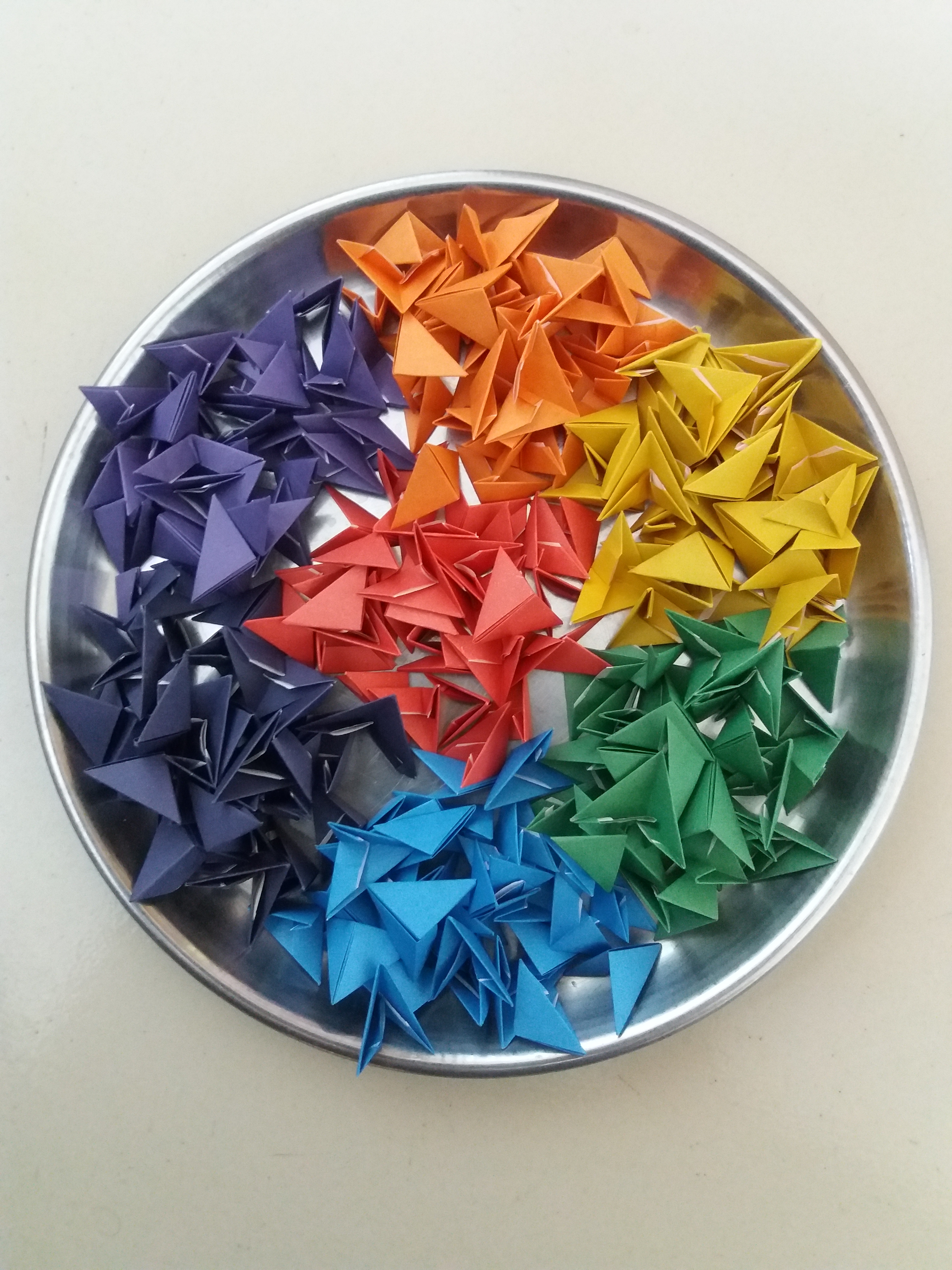
Modules of modular origami

Modular origami forms may be flat or three-dimensional. Flat forms are usually polygons (sometimes known as coasters), stars, rotors, and rings. Three-dimensional forms tend to be regular polyhedra or tessellations of simple polyhedra.

Modular origami techniques can be used to create a wide range of lidded boxes in many shapes. Many examples of such boxes are shown in Tomoko Fuse's books Origami Boxes (1989), Fabulous Origami Boxes (1998), and Tomoko Fuse's Origami Boxes (2018).

There are some modular origami that are approximations of fractals, such as Menger's sponge. Macro-modular origami is a form of modular origami in which finished assemblies are themselves used as the building blocks to create larger integrated structures. Such structures are described in Tomoko Fuse's 1990 book Unit Origami-Multidimensional Transformations.

== Modeling systems ==
=== Robert Neale's penultimate module ===
Neale developed a system to model equilateral polyhedra based on a module with variable vertex angles. Each module has two pockets and two tabs, on opposite sides. The angle of each tab can be changed independently of the other tab. Each pocket can receive tabs of any angle. The most common angles form polygonal faces:

- 60 degrees (triangle)
- 90 degrees (square)
- 108 degrees (pentagon)
- 120 degrees (hexagon)

Each module joins others at the vertices of a polyhedron to form a polygonal face. The tabs form angles on opposite sides of an edge. For example, a subassembly of three triangle corners forms a triangle, the most stable configuration. As the internal angle increases for squares, pentagons and so forth, the stability decreases.

Many polyhedra call for unlike adjacent polygons. For example, a pyramid has one square face and four triangular faces. This requires hybrid modules, or modules having different angles. A pyramid consists of eight modules, four modules as square-triangle, and four as triangle-triangle.

Further polygonal faces are possible by altering the angle at each corner. The Neale modules can form any equilateral polyhedron including those having rhombic faces, like the rhombic dodecahedron.

=== Mukhopadhyay module ===
The Mukhopadhyay module can form any equilateral polyhedron. Each unit has a middle crease that forms an edge, and triangular wings that form adjacent stellated faces. For example, a cuboctahedral assembly has 24 units, since the cuboctahedron has 24 edges. Additionally, bipyramids are possible, by folding the central crease on each module outwards or convexly instead of inwards or concavely as for the icosahedron and other stellated polyhedra. The Mukhopadhyay module works best when glued together, especially for polyhedra having larger numbers of sides.

== Bibliography ==
- Tomoko Fuse (1990). Unit Origami: Multidimensional Transformations. Japan Publications. ISBN 0-87040-852-6.
- Tomoko Fuse (1998). Fabulous Origami Boxes. Japan Publications Trading. ISBN 0870409786.
