= Mugalari =

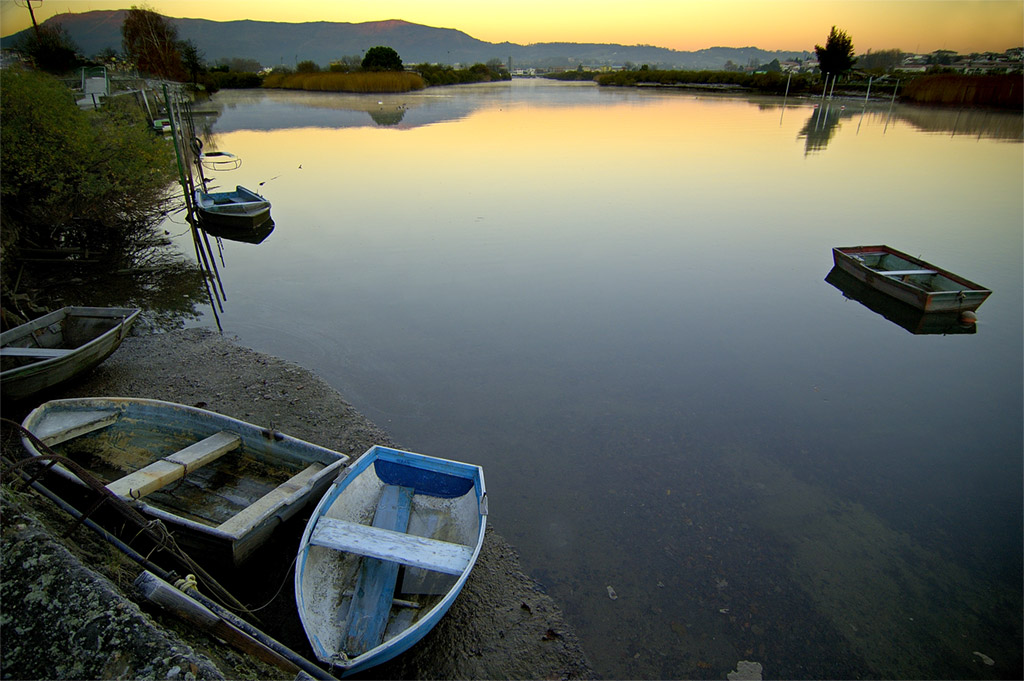
The Bidasoa river establishes the borderline between Gipuzkoa and France

Mugalari is a Basque word used to designate people who help others cross the border between France and Spain, mainly for political reasons. The term is a combination of the words "muga" (border) and "-lari" (suffix related to people), and it refers to people living in the border, and by extension also to smugglers.

The peak of activity of the mugalaris occurred during the Spanish Civil War and World War II, when they helped allied aviators shot down by the Germans in France. Once they had crossed the border, they went to San Sebastián, from where they would be taken by the British consulate to Gibraltar, and then sent to London.

They were also active during Franco's dictatorship, and more recently, as part of the Basque Conflict, they had been helping ETA members to cross the border. Some of them have been arrested and prosecuted as members of the armed organisation. One of the most famous mugalaris was Manuel Mª Garmendia Zubiarrain alias Korta, who was shot dead by the Spanish Civil Guard in Bera, Navarre in 1976. The rock-ska band Kortatu is named after him.

The so-called smugglers' races in which runners carry a full sack on their backs are now one of the Basque rural sports.

== See also ==
- The Pyrenees mountain range forms most of the French-Spanish border.
- People smuggling
