= The General (human trafficker) =

Eritrean human trafficker

"The General", Medhanie Yedhego Mered (alt. Medhanie Yehdego Mered), is a human trafficker. In 2015, he was under investigation by Italian and British authorities.

In 2016, Italian authorities announced his arrest. However, witnesses suggested that this was a mistake. In April 2017, investigators in Rome were questioning the validity of the identification.

Allegedly, the person extradited to Italy and held there is instead a minor figure in the smuggling ring, Medhanie Behre, while the real General remains at large.
