= People smuggling =

Illegal transportation of people

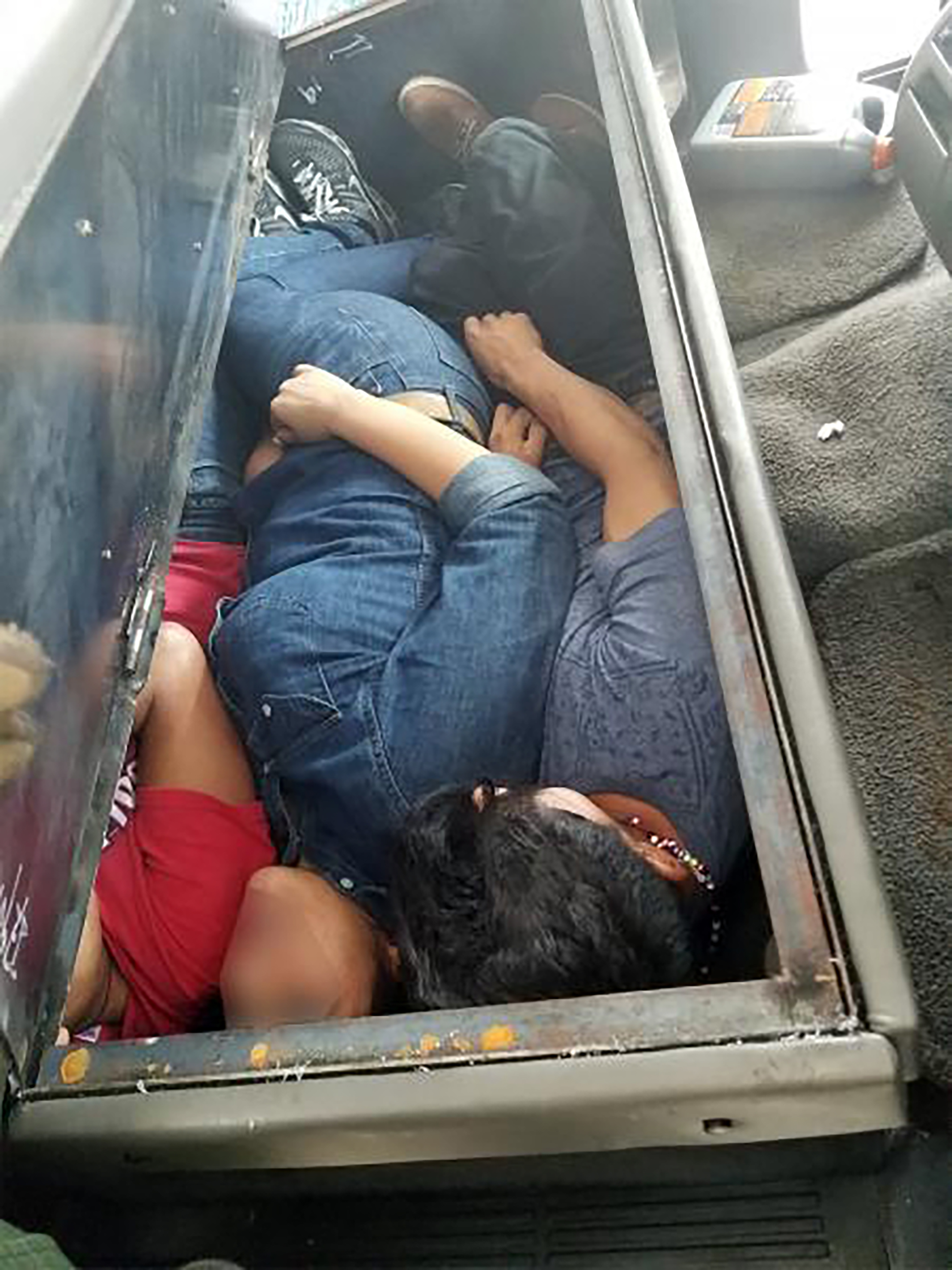
People smuggling at Mexico–United States border, 2017

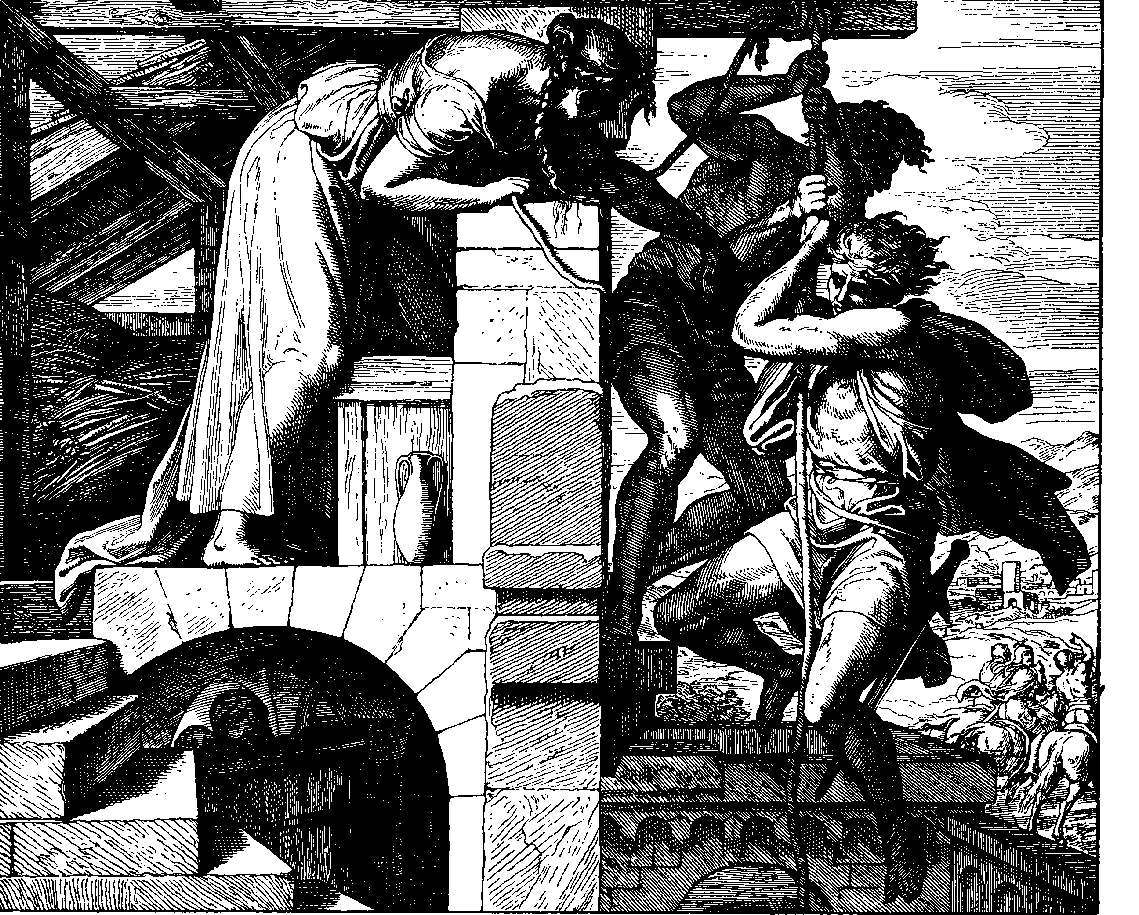
Rahab as a human smuggler in this 1860 woodcut by Julius Schnorr von Karolsfeld

People smuggling (also called human smuggling), under U.S. law, is "the facilitation, transportation, attempted transportation or illegal entry of a person or persons across an international border, in violation of one or more countries' laws, either clandestinely or through deception, such as the use of fraudulent documents".

Internationally, the term is understood as and often used interchangeably with migrant smuggling, which is defined in the Protocol against the Smuggling of Migrants by Land, Sea and Air, supplementing the United Nations Convention against Transnational Organized Crime as "...the procurement, in order to obtain, directly or indirectly, a financial or other material benefit, of the illegal entry of a person into a state party of which the person is not a national".

The practice of people smuggling has seen a rise over the past few decades and now accounts for a significant portion of illegal immigration in countries around the world. People smuggling generally takes place with the consent of the person or persons being smuggled, and common reasons for individuals seeking to be smuggled include employment and economic opportunity, personal and/or familial betterment, and escape from persecution, violence or conflict.

In 2015, the ongoing civil war in Syria has led to massive displacement and reliance on people smugglers to assist people to seek sanctuary in Europe. This has also led to unprecedented movements – and deaths – across the Mediterranean. According to UNHCR statistics, there have been almost one million arrivals by sea in Europe in 2015, and more than 2900 dead or missing migrants. According to the IOM Missing Migrants Project, there have been more than 3800 deaths during migration around the world in 2015, and over 70,000 from 2014 to 2024: some 10,000 of these in the Americas and 30,000 of these in the Mediterranean. However, a 2024 UNHCR report revealed that deaths in the Sahara desert are estimated to be double those occurring in the Mediterranean Sea, with land route fatalities being significantly under-documented due to the remoteness of desert crossings.

Unlike human trafficking, people smuggling is characterized by the consent between customer and smuggler – a contractual agreement that typically terminates upon arrival in the destination location. However, smuggling situations can nonetheless in reality descend into situations that can best be described as extreme human rights abuses, with smuggled migrants subject to threats, abuse, exploitation and torture, and even death at the hands of smugglers. People involved in smuggling operations may also be victims of trafficking, for example when they are tricked about the terms and conditions of their role for the purpose of exploiting their labour in the operation.

Smuggling operations are complex, working within networks of many individual players. As smuggling operations and its underlying infrastructure becomes increasingly intricate, so do the issues surrounding the matter of people smuggling. With major and minor players spanning the globe, people smuggling poses a significant economic and legal impact on society, and solutions to the problem of people smuggling remain contested and under continued debate and development. Smuggling has been described as the classic "wicked problem: one that is hard to define, keeps changing, and does not present a clear solution because of pre-existing factors that are themselves highly resistant to change – in this case the very existence of States, gross inequalities among them, and strong motivations on the part of some to keep them out." Because every state has different economics and governments, this problem cannot be universally defined, and this makes it more difficult for law enforcement to stop smuggling of people, as they have to adapt to the conditions in different states.

== Reasons ==
Many individuals who consent to being smuggled are escaping poverty and hardship, seeking opportunities and better conditions abroad, or seeking asylum from natural disaster, conflict, or persecution, but aren't able to legally immigrate due to a weak passport, or fear of being deported or imprisoned. While many who are smuggled are poor and uneducated, there are also others who belong to the educated middle class.

== Operations ==
People smuggling operations range from small to large-scale actors operating in a transnational market. Small-scale smugglers generally arrange all aspects of the smuggling operations themselves. However, more commonly, smugglers engage and do business within a larger smuggling network where there is a division of work among the actors involved. In the past, smuggling rings tended to be more obscure, amateurish, and limited. As people smuggling has continued to grow, however, smuggling rings are far more extensive and organized. In Mexico, as Jim Chaparro – head of the anti-smuggling office at the US Immigration and Naturalization Service – puts it, the once small and informal smuggling business has evolved into a powerful web of "literally hundreds of syndicates, some at a low level and some at the kingpin level". (In fact, as the flow of illegal immigrants into the United States from Mexico has become more organized, there has opened an opportunity for smuggling groups within Mexico to market their services to non-Mexicans. Indeed, smuggling operations are often complex and smuggled persons often make stops at countries across the globe before arriving at their final destination.)

A Lebanese-Mexican Symbiotic smuggling network involved in human smuggling into the United States of America that came to the attention of law enforcement and counterintelligence has been described in the literature.

Over the years, smuggling has evolved into a sophisticated service industry, with certain routes and enclaves used by smugglers becoming practically institutionalized; for example: from Mexico and Central America to the United States, from West Asia through Greece and Turkey to Western Europe, and within East and Southeast Asia. Responsible for the flourishing business of people smuggling are a combination of interacting factors, from weak legislation and lax border controls to corrupt officials and the power of organized crime.

The complexity of the smuggling network is dependent upon the route to be taken and the nature of the journey. For routes that are well-known and tested, smugglers may function more as family enterprises and utilize fairly contained operations. The more complex the route, however, the more members of the smuggling network must be recruited. In general, the infrastructure of the people smuggling business is nontraditional, with no clearly identifiable organization and no rigid structure. The network of smugglers is diffused and decentralized. Smugglers form temporary business alliances, and the organization of smugglers can best be understood and described as ad hoc task forces, in which activities are specialized and controlled by individuals that deal with each other on a one-to-one basis. In the business of people smuggling, there is no single "godfather" figure who commands the activities of subordinates; rather, individuals conduct business on equal grounds and tend to consider themselves free agents. In fact, according to a Los Angeles-based smuggler, "The division of labor is really clear and refined. Everyone involved is useful in his own way and does his own thing only. There is no leadership in any smuggling rings. Leadership will not emerge because the work involved is so specialized".

According to Frontex, people smugglers give detailed descriptions of benefits of individual EU countries so they can compare the available benefits of for instance Sweden, Denmark and Germany before applying for asylum.

== Smuggling vs. trafficking ==
A concerted international focus on defining and responding to migrant smuggling only occurred in the 1990s. This focus followed sharp rises in irregular migration to the United States, and to Europe in the 1980s and 1990s. A focus on those who facilitate irregular migration – rather than migrants themselves – was seen as a critical element of any response. The resulting legal framework was the Protocol against the Smuggling of Migrants by Land, Sea and Air (Migrant Smuggling Protocol), that supplements the parent instrument, the United Nations Convention against Transnational Organized Crime.

The Migrant Smuggling Protocol does not provide a complete or self-contained legal regime. It exists as part of a "dense web of rights, obligations and responsibilities drawn not just from the Protocol and Convention but also from the law of the sea, human rights law, and refugee law".

An important distinction to make is that between human smuggling and human trafficking. Given the complex nature of human smuggling and trafficking operations, the difference between these two criminal operations is not always readily apparent. Delineating between the two involves taking closer look at the subtle differences between each.

Generally speaking, human trafficking involves transporting individuals from one place to another either against their will or under some sort of false pretense. With smuggling, on the other hand, there is understood to be an agreement between smuggler and customer, a meeting of the minds and a contract between the two. These differences can similarly be detected in the Trafficking and Smuggling Protocols (more commonly known as the Palermo Protocols) passed by the UN Convention on Transnational Organized Crime. The Palermo Protocols frame the difference between smuggling and trafficking around the dichotomy of coercion and consent: whereas people who are trafficked are considered "victims" or "survivors", individuals who are smuggled are seen as having engaged willingly in an enterprise that one or both of the bordering countries consider illegal. (This dichotomous framework is particularly evident in the protections afforded for each group. The Trafficking Protocol addresses the need for protection of trafficked persons and provides for a broad range of protective measures, while the Smuggling Protocol contains minimal reference to protections for smuggled persons).

More specifically, below are three main technical differences between smuggling and trafficking, which are as follows:

1. Consent – trafficking victims are those who have been subjected to coercive, deceptive, or abusive action by traffickers. These victims either never consented, or if they did, their initial consent is rendered meaningless by the subsequent actions of the traffickers.
2. Exploitation – smuggling operations and interaction between smuggler and customer usually terminate upon payment and arrival at destination; trafficking victims, on the other hand, are often involved in a cycle of ongoing exploitation.
3. Source of Profits – primary profits from smuggling operations are derived from transportation and facilitation of illegal entry or stay in another country, whereas trafficking operations profit largely from the exploitation of victims.

The recognition of trafficked persons as "victims" but smuggled migrants as "objects" of a process is a principal point of difference between how international law treats trafficked and smuggled migrants. Nonetheless, it is important to recognise that in reality and in law, smuggled migrants can still be victims of crime – whether this is theft, fraud, sexual assault, deprivation of liberty or even human trafficking.

Sometimes there is a gender dimension to the distinction between smuggling and trafficking: those who are smuggled are often assumed to be mostly men, whereas victims of trafficking are more commonly assumed to be women and children.

== Major players ==
With smugglers operating from numerous countries across the globe, there are myriad minor and major players within the people smuggling scene. Of wide and notable repute, however, are the Snakeheads and Coyotes, which operate in the business of smuggling Chinese and Mexican migrants, respectively.

=== Snakeheads ===
The name "Snakehead" refers to those underground players who operate in facilitating the illicit transport of Chinese migrants into countries like the United States and other Western countries. (The name originates from the fact that the lines of emigrants sneaking under borders is said to look like a snake.) Operating in an extensive transnational black market, Snakeheads reap considerable profits from their smuggling operations and both are regarded and consider themselves not as criminals but as resourceful guides. The earliest snakeheads went into business around the 1970s ferrying customers from Fuzhou or Changle into Hong Kong. Today, Snakehead operations have expanded enormously into other countries; however, the majority of Snakehead customers still originate from the Fujian province in China. One of the most notable Snakeheads was Sister Ping, who ran a successful and extensive smuggling operation in New York from 1984 to 2000, when she was finally caught by authorities following the disaster involving the Golden Venture.

=== Coyotes ===
"Coyotes" is the name for smugglers who facilitate the migration of people across the Mexico–United States and Bolivia–Chile borders. Another term used for minors who smuggle people across the Mexico–United States border is "polleros". Once dominated by local smugglers charging relatively small sums, the business landscape has changed as larger, well-organized syndicates have entered the smuggling industry in Mexico. Over the years, Coyotes have become more sophisticated in their operations, as technological advances have allowed them to streamline and add further complexity to their business.

== Facts and figures ==
Virtually every country in the world is affected by people smuggling, be it in the capacity of country of origin, transit, or destination. While reliable data is scarce, experts note that "current estimates place the number of irregular migrants worldwide at up to thirty million and that a substantial proportion of these persons can be expected to have used the services of smugglers at one or more points in their journey".

People smuggling between the United States and Mexico is a booming business that, as of 2003, garnered over $5 billion a year. Similarly, in the EU, profits from people smuggling operations is estimated to be around €4 billion per year.

People smuggling is a dangerous operation and has frequently resulted in the death of those individuals being smuggled. In 2004, 464 recorded deaths took place during the crossing from Mexico to the United States, and each year, an estimated 2000 people drown in the Mediterranean on the journey from Africa into Europe.

On 14 September 2018, US media reported that Jacklyn, a seven-year-old girl from Guatemala, had died while in custody of US Customs. The girl's family denied she did not have enough food to eat before she died.

=== Estimated number of smuggled individuals ===
Because of the clandestine nature of people smuggling operations, information currently available is scattered and incomplete. As such, verifiable or even reliable figures are difficult, if not impossible to come by, and the data on the number of smuggled individuals is tenuous at best. However, as of 2005, it was estimated that upwards of 350,000 illegal immigrants are smuggled across America's border from Mexico each year, and as many as 800,000 enter the European Union.

=== Estimated costs ===
Smugglers' fees vary from destination to destination, but on the whole, they have risen dramatically over the years. The prices paid to human smugglers by immigrants vary depending on the geographic location. For border crossings such as from Mexico into the United States, human smugglers can charge up to $4,000, while trans-Pacific crossings of, for example, Chinese immigrants into the United States can cost up to $75,000. These prices are significantly steeper than they were a decade ago, as demand for smuggling services continues to rise, operations become more complex, and costs of smuggling individuals become higher.

== Criminal elements ==
People smuggling – specifically migrant smuggling – constitutes criminal conduct. However, criminal elements of smuggling may reach beyond the sphere of human smuggling. In a testimony before Congress, William D. Cadman – INS counterterrorism coordinator – stated, "Organized crime syndicates...are known to use alien-smuggling operations to support and further their criminal objectives".

Given the dangerous and clandestine criminal nature of people smuggling operations, smuggled persons are sometimes at risk of becoming victims of other crimes. Aside from subjection to unsafe conditions in their journeys to their destinations, smuggled individuals may also be subject to physical or sexual abuse or placed in hostage-like conditions until their debts are paid off. Others might face exploitation or be forced to participate in other criminal activities during their journey as smuggled individuals. Because smuggling can generate substantial profits for those involved, which in turn can fuel corruption and organized crime in countries traveled from, through, or to during the smuggling process.

Countries that have ratified the Migrant Smuggling Protocol are obligated to ensure migrant smuggling offences are criminal in their national laws. The UN has produced a Model Law that sets out minimum and recommended provisions for national laws on migrant smuggling. This includes model criminal offence provisions (see further, UNODC, Model Law against the Smuggling of Migrants).

=== Drug trafficking ===
Given the clandestine but booming nature of people smuggling operations – especially in places like Mexico – drug cartels have also begun tapping into the smuggling network. Cartels have made money not only by taxing Coyotes but also directly engaging in the business of smuggling. In the late 1990s, Mexican drug cartels began initially moving into people smuggling by taxing Coyotes for leading bands of smuggled people across cartel-controlled territory. As these drug cartels have gotten more directly involved, however, they are beginning to play a more central role in the business of people smuggling and often exploit individuals – seen as human cargo – and using them by loading them up with backpacks full of marijuana. Sometimes, the costs of the expensive journey may be defrayed as migrants serve as "mules", carrying drugs out of Mexico.

The questions of whether smuggling groups or syndicates would smuggle two different types of contraband at the same time (Multiple Consignment Contraband) (MCC) has been debated within and between law enforcement and intelligence analysts. Furthermore, if this type of smuggling is occurring, which types of MCC are most likely to be bundled together and which type of smuggling group (defined by level of sophistication) would engage in MCC and which regions in the world are most likely to be confronted with MCC also has been discussed by these analysts. The Lichtenwald, Perri and MacKenzie article identified sixteen cases of different smuggling groups smuggling more than one type of contraband at the same time. Four of the sixteen cases involved MCC human and drug smuggling. Three of the four MCC human and drug smuggling organizations were targeting the United States of America.

== Law enforcement and discouragement ==
Thus far, global efforts to curb and stymie the growing tide of smuggled individuals have been largely focused on the apprehension and deportation of individual migrants. Little has been done in the way of dismantling the organizations behind the business of people smuggling. According to the UNODC, "[t]ackling migrant smuggling necessitates a comprehensive, multi-dimensional response, which begins with addressing the socio-economic root causes of irregular migration to prevent it, and goes through to prosecution of criminals who commit smuggling-related crimes". At the same time, scientific studies on the counterproductive aspects of security policies have shown "how smugglers, as a category of actors playing a specific part in the global migration process, are directly manufactured by the migration policies".

Other proposals include focusing not on banning or trying to stifle the smuggling industry, but on undercutting it. Michael Jandl from the International Center for Migration Policy Development, an intergovernmental think-tank based in Vienna, has suggested that governments issue temporary visas in the smugglers' best markets at fees priced to compete with the smugglers' rates. Under this proposed plan, one-third of the visa fee could be returned to immigrants upon their departure, and opportunities to purchase additional visas in the future would be available for those who did not break any rules.

In January 2025, the UK introduced 'world first' sanctions regime against people smugglers by cutting off the illicit financing that fuels their operations. The sanctions include measures such as asset freezes, travel bans, and social media blackouts. These actions aim to prevent and disrupt irregular migration and the smuggling of migrants into the UK.

== Statistics ==
Following table shows the recent annual people smuggling report rate per 100,000 population. The rate of under-reporting varies by country.

| Country | Reported annual people smuggling per 100,000 | Year |
|---|---|---|
| Albania | 4.0 | 2024 |
| Algeria | 2.1 | 2024 |
| Andorra | 1.3 | 2019 |
| Antigua and Barbuda | 0.0 | 2024 |
| Armenia | 0.5 | 2024 |
| Austria | 17.2 | 2024 |
| Azerbaijan | 0.1 | 2024 |
| Bahamas | 5.0 | 2023 |
| Barbados | 0.0 | 2024 |
| Belarus | 0.4 | 2024 |
| Belgium | 1.5 | 2024 |
| Bhutan | 0.4 | 2020 |
| Bolivia | 0.5 | 2023 |
| Bosnia and Herzegovina | 2.4 | 2024 |
| Brazil | 0.0 | 2024 |
| Bulgaria | 10.7 | 2024 |
| Canada | 1.7 | 2024 |
| Chile | 0.5 | 2023 |
| Colombia | 0.2 | 2024 |
| Costa Rica | 1.3 | 2024 |
| Croatia | 42.9 | 2024 |
| Cyprus | 5.1 | 2024 |
| Czech Republic | 0.2 | 2024 |
| Denmark | 2.6 | 2024 |
| Dominica | 0.0 | 2024 |
| Dominican Republic | 0.3 | 2024 |
| Ecuador | 0.6 | 2024 |
| El Salvador | 8.1 | 2022 |
| Estonia | 0.7 | 2024 |
| Finland | 1.8 | 2024 |
| France | 4.2 | 2024 |
| Germany | 9.4 | 2024 |
| Greece | 12.6 | 2024 |
| Grenada | 0.0 | 2023 |
| Guatemala | 0.6 | 2024 |
| Guyana | 0.0 | 2024 |
| Honduras | 0.1 | 2024 |
| Hungary | 5.4 | 2024 |
| Iceland | 3.1 | 2024 |
| Indonesia | 0.1 | 2024 |
| Ireland | 0.6 | 2017 |
| Israel | 149.1 | 2024 |
| Italy | 2.9 | 2024 |
| Japan | 0.0 | 2024 |
| Kazakhstan | 0.4 | 2020 |
| Kenya | 2.3 | 2023 |
| Kosovo | 1.8 | 2021 |
| Latvia | 0.7 | 2024 |
| Liechtenstein | 7.5 | 2024 |
| Lithuania | 3.9 | 2024 |
| Macau | 43.9 | 2024 |
| Madagascar | 0.0 | 2024 |
| Maldives | 0.9 | 2017 |
| Malta | 1.1 | 2024 |
| Mexico | 0.6 | 2024 |
| Moldova | 29.4 | 2024 |
| Monaco | 80.5 | 2016 |
| Mongolia | 0.3 | 2024 |
| Montenegro | 4.1 | 2024 |
| Morocco | 4.6 | 2023 |
| Myanmar | 0.1 | 2023 |
| Namibia | 0.2 | 2021 |
| Netherlands | 0.3 | 2024 |
| New Zealand | 0.0 | 2023 |
| North Macedonia | 3.3 | 2024 |
| Northern Ireland | 0.0 | 2021 |
| Norway | 1.2 | 2024 |
| Oman | 0.6 | 2023 |
| Panama | 1.7 | 2024 |
| Paraguay | 0.0 | 2022 |
| Peru | 0.3 | 2022 |
| Philippines | 0.2 | 2024 |
| Poland | 1.7 | 2024 |
| Portugal | 1.1 | 2024 |
| Qatar | 0.0 | 2021 |
| Romania | 0.3 | 2024 |
| Russia | 0.5 | 2020 |
| Saint Kitts and Nevis | 0.0 | 2024 |
| Saint Lucia | 0.0 | 2023 |
| Saudi Arabia | 143.6 | 2019 |
| Scotland | 0.5 | 2023 |
| Senegal | 0.1 | 2016 |
| Serbia | 5.0 | 2024 |
| Slovakia | 0.7 | 2024 |
| Slovenia | 26.1 | 2024 |
| Spain | 0.8 | 2024 |
| Sri Lanka | 0.9 | 2016 |
| St. Vincent and Grenadines | 0.0 | 2024 |
| Suriname | 23.1 | 2019 |
| Sweden | 1.0 | 2024 |
| Switzerland | 0.7 | 2024 |
| Syria | 0.4 | 2018 |
| Thailand | 49.3 | 2024 |
| Turkey | 8.7 | 2024 |
| United Arab Emirates | 0.1 | 2023 |
| United States of America | 1.5 | 2023 |
| Vatican City | 0.0 | 2024 |
| Venezuela | 2.4 | 2018 |

== See also ==
- Coyote
- Identity document forgery
- Illegal emigration
- Illegal immigration
- Mugalari
- Snakehead
- Frozen River (2008), a film about two working-class women smuggling illegal immigrants from Canada to the US in order to make ends meet
