= Snakehead (film) =

- Theatrical film poster
- Directed by: Evan Jackson Leong
- Written by: Evan Jackson Leong
- Produced by: Evan Jackson Leong; Anson Ho; Dan Mark; Brian Yang
- Starring: Shuya Chang; Jade Wu; Sung Kang
- Cinematography: Ray Huang
- Edited by: Evan Jackson Leong; Greg Louie; Chelsea Taylor
- Music by: Roman Molino Dunn
- Production companies: Arowana Films; 408 Films
- Distributed by: Roadside Attractions; Samuel Goldwyn Films
- Release dates: September 14, 2021 (TIFF); October 29, 2021
- Running time: 89 minutes
- Country: United States
- Languages: Chinese; English

Snakehead is a 2021 American crime drama action-thriller film edited, produced, written and directed by Evan Jackson Leong and starring Shuya Chang, Jade Wu and Sung Kang. The film premiered in the Discovery section at the 2021 Toronto International Film Festival.

== Plot ==
After her jail sentence was commuted and the custody of her only daughter Rosie was lost, Tse travels to New York via human smuggler known as "Snakehead", in hopes of reuniting with her. Coming from Taiwan, Sister Tse pays a smuggler a $50,000 fee for her passage to New York. Upon arrival, she heads to Dai Mah, a brothel owner, who demands her to repay her $57,000. Because she doesn't have such money, she needs to gain favor from the matriarch of the crime family and rise through ranks quickly. Her success, however, does come at a cost. Throughout her stay in America, she will endure harsh mistreatment by men, while working in a brothel. After reimbursing Dai Mah, as well as beating up one of her customers and killing Dai Mah's pimp, she heads to find Rosie, who, as she later learns from Rosie herself, was subsequently adopted by a New York couple.

== Cast ==
- Shuya Chang as Sister Tse
- Jade Wu as Dai Mah
- Sung Kang as "Rambo"
- Yacine Djoumbaye as Zareeb
- Catherine Jiang as Rosie
- Richie Eng as Paigwut
- Sandra Eloani as FBI Agent Olivia
- Devon Diep as Sinh
- Perry Yung as Suhyun
- Celia Au as Jia
- Jamie Choi as Barbie
- Burton Perez as "Coyote"
- Branden Smith as "Scorpion"
- Linette Kim as FBI Sting

== Production ==
The film was written and directed by Evan Jackson Leong. The story is loosely inspired by that of Sister Ping, a human smuggler who ran an operation between Hong Kong and New York City from 1984 to 2000.

== Release ==
Snakehead premiered at the 2021 Toronto International Film Festival and subsequently was screened at the 20th New York Asian Film Festival. On June 16, 2021, the film's rights were acquired by Samuel Goldwyn Films and Roadside Attractions to release the film in North America. Initially, the date for the U.S. release was set for October 10, 2021, but it was quickly changed to October 29. In Australia, the film was released under Odin's Eye Entertainment umbrella.

== Reception ==
On review aggregator website Rotten Tomatoes, the film has an approval rating of 70% based on 20 critics, with an average rating of 5.9/10. On Metacritic, Snakehead holds a rank of 55 out of a 100 based on 5 critics, indicating "mixed or average reviews".

Beandrea July of The New York Times wrote "Snakehead tumbles all too quietly under the weight of its ambition".

Writing for Variety, Richard Kuipers commented "Though it switches tone abrasively at times, and some story aspects feel a little too formulaic, "Snakehead" burns brightly when focused on the Faustian relationship of its formidable female characters".

Kristen Lopez of indieWire said "[T]here's far more of Snakehead that works than doesn't, and Leong shows a serious flair for crime dramas".

According to Justin Lowe of The Hollywood Reporter, "Leong adroitly captures both the vulnerability and the menace of a woman who finally takes control of her life after decades of victimization, delivering a taut crime drama".

The film was awarded with 3 stars out of 5 from Odie Henderson of RogerEbert.com who explained his reasoning for it by writing that "[the film] entices you with a lurid premise, but the empathy that shines through the cracks of its tough exterior is the real surprise".

Kate Taylor of The Globe and Mail had to disagree with the fellow critics. Her reaction to the film was "[while] Leon's documentary realism is powerful - if tough on an audience - but his fiction skills are erratic".
