= Kunihiko Kasahara =

Japanese origami master

Kunihiko Kasahara (笠原 邦彦, Kasahara Kunihiko) (born 1941) is a Japanese origami master. He has made more than a hundred origami models, from simple lion masks to complex modular origami, such as a small stellated dodecahedron. He does not specialize in what is known as "super complex origami", but rather he likes making simple, elegant animals, and modular designs such as polyhedra, as well as exploring the mathematics and geometry of origami. A book expressing both approaches is Origami for the Connoisseur (Kasahara and Takahama), which gathers modern innovations in polyhedral construction, featuring moderately difficult but accessible methods for producing the Platonic solids from single sheets, and much more.

Kasahara is perhaps origami's most enthusiastic designer and collector of origami models that are variations on a cube, a number of which appear in Vol. 2 of a 2005 three volume work (presently available only in Japanese). Vol. 3 of the same work is devoted to another Kasahara interest: reverse engineering and diagramming classic Japanese origami models pictured in early works, such as zenbazuru (thousand origami cranes from the Hiden Senbazuru Orikata of 1797, one of the earliest known origami books), the origami art of folding multiple connected cranes out of a single sheet of paper.

He has written many books, of which Origami Omnibus is his best known book available in English, and contains many of his models as well as outstanding classics by others.

== Bibliography ==
- Creative Origami, Japan Publications, 1967. ISBN 0-87040-411-3
- Origami Made Easy, Japan Publications, 1973. ISBN 0-87040-253-6
- Origami Omnibus: Paper Folding for Everybody, Japan Publication, 1988. ISBN 4-8170-9001-4
- Origami for the Connoisseur (with Toshie Takahama), Japan Publications, 1998. ISBN 4-8170-9002-2
- Amazing Origami, Sterling, 2002. ISBN 0-8069-5821-9
- Extreme Origami, Sterling, 2003. ISBN 1-4027-0602-2
- The Art and Wonder of Origami Quarry Book, 2005. ISBN 1-59253-213-6
- おりがみ新発見〈1〉半開折り・回転折り・非対称の形 日貿出版社 (Spirals & asymmetric shapes) 2005. ISBN 4-8170-8085-X
- おりがみ新発見〈2〉キューブの世界 (単行本) (Cubes) 2005. ISBN 4-8170-8086-8
- おりがみ新発見〈3〉古典から最新作まで300年の絵巻 (300-year-old Classics, senbazuru) 2005. ISBN 4-8170-8087-6
