= Tamika Lamison =

American actor, filmmaker, and humanitarian

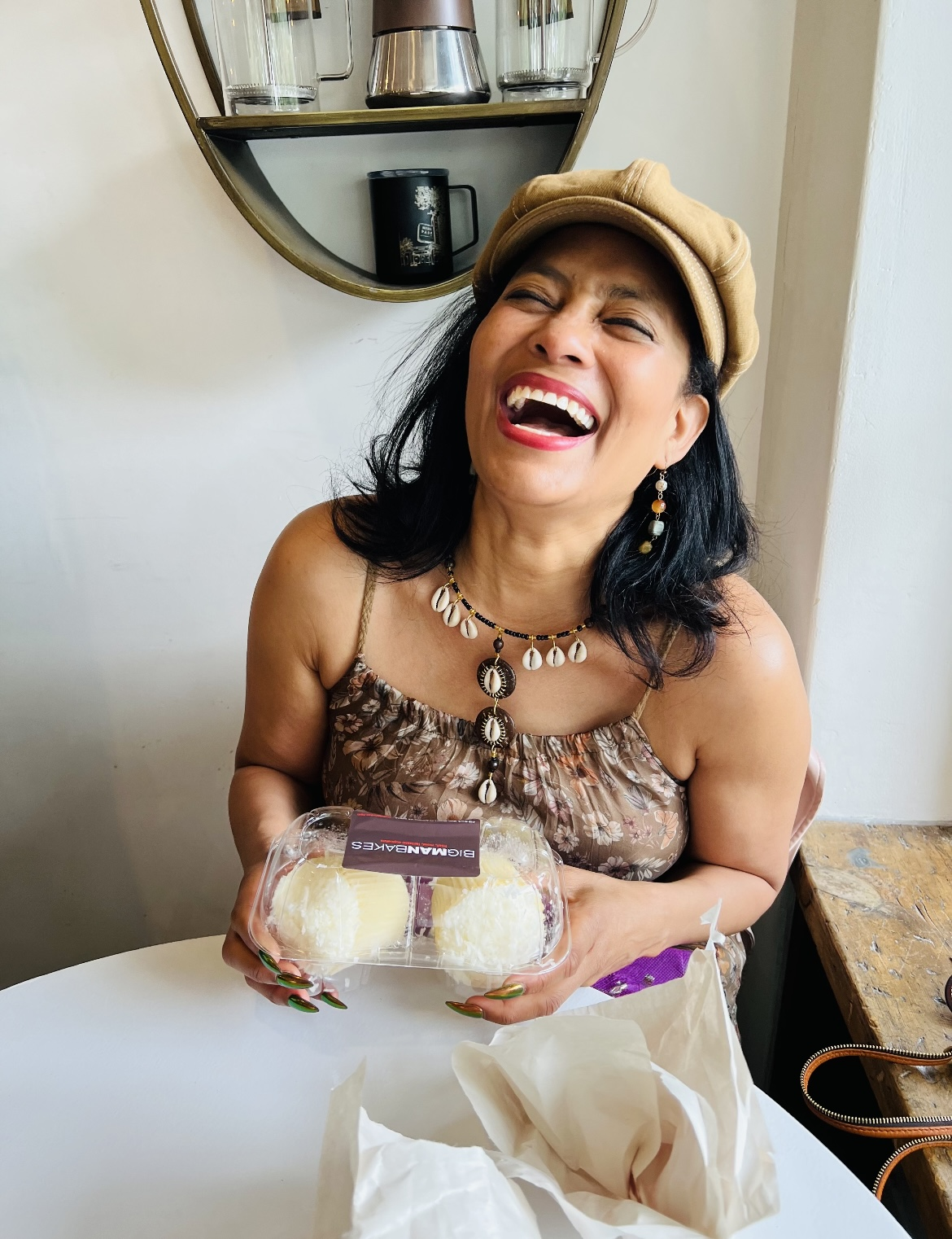
- Tamika Lamison in 2023
- Born: 26 May 1969 (age 57)
- Education: American University
- Occupations: Actress; producer
- Years active: 1990–present
- Relatives: Cleve Lamison (brother)
- Beauty pageant titleholder
- Title: Miss Black Virginia 1990

Tamika Lamison (born May 26, 1969) is an American Film maker, producer, actress, activist, humanitarian and former beauty queen. She has won two Reel Sisters of the Diaspora Awards and received nomination for the NAACP Image Awards. Lamison's films are funded through grants, non-profit entities, and independent production budgets. She is known for founding the Make A Film Foundation (MAFF), a nonprofit organization that helps children with serious medical conditions create short films. Born in Virginia, Lamison won Miss Black Virginia in 1990.

Lamison directed and produced the short films Hope (2003), and Superman Doesn't Steal (2024), with the latter garnering a Pan African Film Festival Award, NAACP Image Awards, Cameroon International Film Festival Award and a Septimius Awards. Like Monogamy (TV series), each of these was critically acclaimed.

== Early life and career ==
Tamika Lamison was born and raised in Richmond, Virginia. She graduated from Huguenot High School in 1987 and was a member of the city's Jazz Actors Troupe. She later attended American University, where she earned a Bachelor of Arts degree in Performing Arts and Theatre. After graduating, she moved to New York, where she appeared in several stage productions and wrote her first screenplay, The Jar by the Door. The screenplay was a finalist at the Sundance Film Festival and received the Gordon Parks Indie Film Award, which carried a $10,000 cash prize. She later used the award prize money to relocate to Los Angeles. Lamison subsequently studied filmmaking at the New York Film Academy, where she completed her first short film. There, she appeared in a 1995 New Federal Theatre off-Broadway revival of For Coloured Girls directed by playwright Ntozake Shange. The role earned her an Audelco Award. Lamison participated in the Miss Black Virginia 1990 pageant, which she won.

Lamison professional career began as an actress, performing in various theaters in Washington, D.C., and New York City. Her film, television and plays credits includes "Last Life", "Shear Madness" at the Kennedy Center in Washington. and serving as a writer and supervising producer for the television series "Monogamy". She played Diego a model in the historical drama film Cradle Will Rock in 1999.

In 2003, Lamison wrote, directed, and produced the short film HOPE, which received several awards. She later directed her first reality television series, College Hill, which received mixed reviews from critics. In 2004, she produced the short film The Male Groupie, which was acquired by HBO for national broadcast. She also directed the short film Spin (2007), on which she served as a co-producer. In 2005, she directed the short film P.N.O.K. and produced K(no)w De.

Lamison continued to work on short films and documentaries, including Put It in a Book (2007), The Question (2012), and The Real Blood Ghost. In 2017, she wrote, directed and produced The 3rd Era of Medicine. Her other production credits that year included Katharine of America and Sex and Violence! or: A Brief Review of Simple Physics.

=== Make A Film Foundation ===
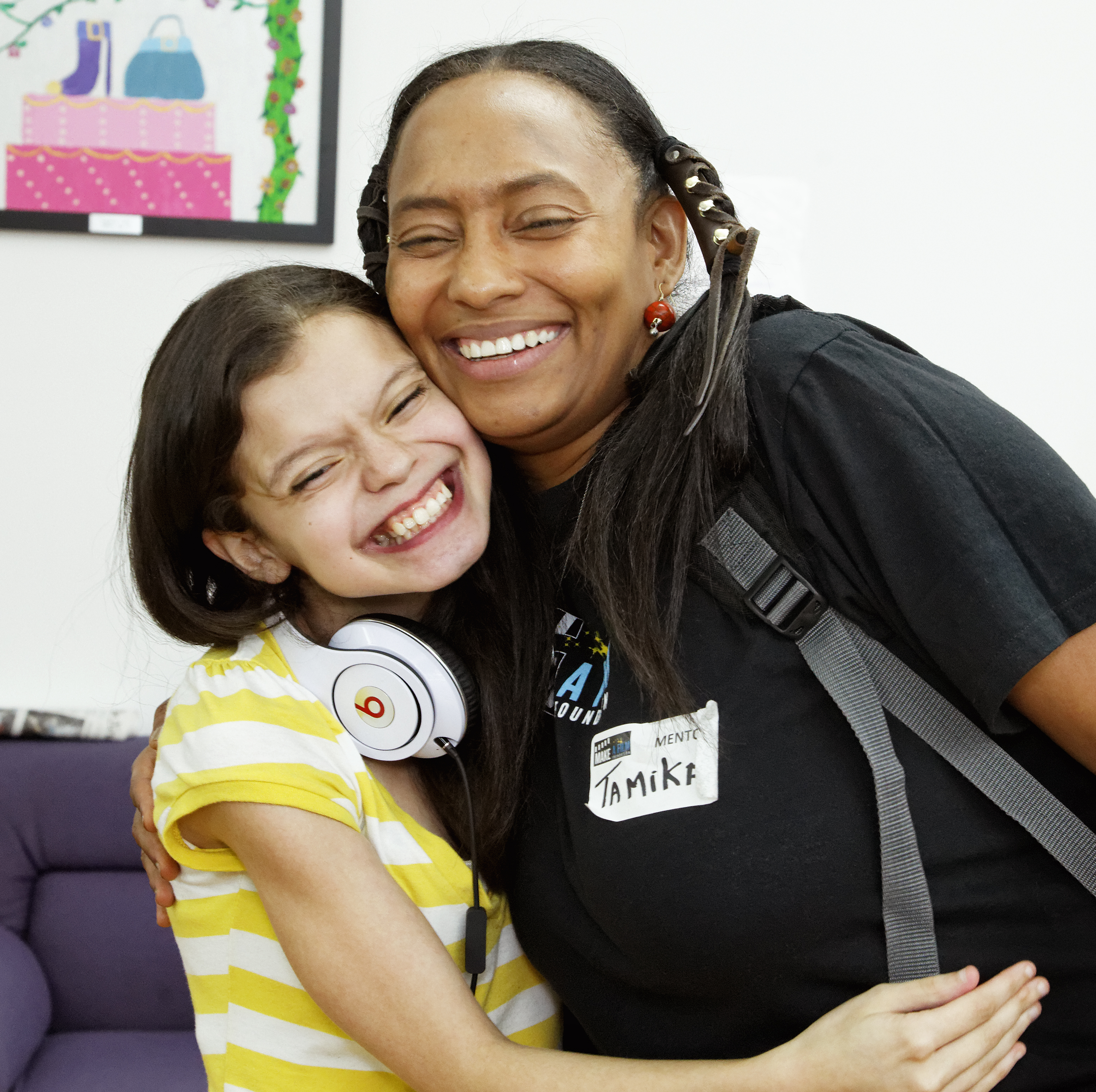

Lamison founded the Make A Film Foundation (MAFF), an organisation that grants film wishes to children with serious or life-threatening medical conditions. By teaming them with noted actors, writers, and directors to create short film legacies. She has produced over 100 short films through the Foundation short film program and Vidz 4 Kidz Short Documentary Program.

Lamison’s work with the Foundation includes notable projects such as Deep Blue Breath (2011), a live-action and animated film written by Clay Beabout when he was 11. Another is The Magic Bracelet (2013), written by Diablo Cody and produced by Lamison, a film created to fulfill the wish of Rina Goldberg, a teenager who died of mitochondrial disease.

Lamison's next MAFF project, The Black Ghiandola, starred J. K. Simmons, Laura Dern, David Lynch, Richard Chamberlain, and Johnny Depp and was released on April 22, 2017.

=== Superman Doesn't Steal and awards success (2024–present) ===
In 2024, Lamison released the coming-of-age short drama film, Superman Doesn't Steal which She directed and wrote and co-produced with Chris Beal, Dominique Deleon, and Carol Ann Shine. The film starred Jordyn McIntosh, Mustafa Shakir, Ellis Hobbs IV, and E. Roger Mitchell. Inspired by true events, that took place during the tragic era of the 1970s Atlanta child murders. It received critical acclaim from critics and audiences and made its way to several film festivals, Including the Cleveland International Film Festival and the Tallahassee Film Festival. Among its accolades, the film won the NAACP Image Awards for Best Outstanding Short Form, the Pan African Film Festival Award for Best Film, Septimius Awards and Reel Sisters of the Diaspora Awards for Best Narrative Short, and Lamison also won an award for Best Director at the Sisters of the Diaspora Awards.

== Advocacy and leadership ==
Lamison served as the executive director of the Commercial Directors Diversity Program (CDDP), a diversity and inclusion initiative created through negotiations between the Directors Guild of America (DGA) and the Association of Independent Commercial Producers (AICP). She also worked as a producer and vice president of development at a film company focused on art advocacy and commercial projects.

== Controversy ==
=== Allegations against Vincent Cirrincione ===
Lamison was among nine women, mostly women of color, who accused Vincent Cirrincione of sexual harassment. In February 2018, she publicly accuse Cirrincione of sexual misconduct. Lamison said that in 1996, Cirrincione took a phone call from Halle Berry on speakerphone before her audition. She alleged that he later kissed her without her consent while she was reciting a poem, and offered to represent her only if she was available for sex.

=== Miss Black Virginia Pageant Concerns ===
In 1992, Lamison raised concerns about the management of the Miss Black Virginia pageant. She said she was frequently asked to solicit money for the organization but did not know where the funds went. She also said that two years after winning the title in 1990, she was still waiting for the remainder of her prize money. She reported sending 50 to 60 complaint letters to businesses.

== Filmography ==
=== Film / TV ===
Year	Title	Director	Writer	Producer	Actor
1999	Cradle Will Rock	No	No	No	Yes
2004	College Hill	Yes	No	No	No
2018	Craig Ross Jr.'s Monogamy	No	Yes	Yes	No
2018	Last Life	No	No	Yes	Yes
2018	kumba Shule	No	No	No	Yes

Short films / Documentaries

Year	Title	Director	Writer	Actor	Producer
2003	Hope	Yes	Yes	No	Yes
2004	The Male Groupie	No	No	No	Yes
2005	P.N.O.K	Yes	No	No	No
2005	K(no)w De:tales	No	No	No	Yes
2007	Spin	Yes	No	No	Yes
2007	Put It in a Book	No	No	No	Yes
2011	Deep Blue Breath	No	No	No	Yes
2012	The Question	No	No	No	Yes
2013	The Real Blood Ghost	No	No	No	Yes
2013	The Magic Bracelet	No	No	No	Yes
2017	The 3rd Era of Medicine	Yes	Yes	Yes	No
2017	The Black Ghiandola	No	No	No	Yes
2017	Katharine of America	No	No	No	Yes
2017	Sex and Violence! or: A Brief Review of Simple Physics	No	No	No	Yes
2021	Ferguson Rises	No	No	No	Yes
2022	Bourn Kind: The Tiny Kindness Project	No	No	No	Yes
2024	Superman Doesn't Steal	Yes	Yes	Yes	Yes

== Awards and recognition ==
Year	Award	Category	Result	Ref
2025	Image Awards (NAACP)	Outstanding Short Form	Won	
2025	Cameroon International Film Festival	Best short International film	Won	
2024	Pan African Film Festival	Best Film	Won	
2024	Septimius Awards	Best Short Film	Won	
2024	Tallahassee Film Festival	Audience Choice Award	Won	
2024	Chesapeake Film Festival	Best Short Narrative	Won	
2024	Reel Sisters of the Diaspora	Best Director	Won	
2024	Reel Sisters of the Diaspora	Best Narrative Short	Won	
