= NAACP Image Award for Outstanding Short Form =

American short film award

The NAACP Image Award for Outstanding Short Form are three awards presented by the NAACP for short films:

- live action works (since 2021)
- animated works (since 2021)
- documentary motion picture (since 2024)

== List ==
Year	Film	Director(s)	Ref
2021	Animated		
2021	Canvas	Frank E. Abney III	
2021	Cops and Robbers	Arnon Manor, Timothy Ware-Hill	
2021	Loop		
2021	The Power of Hope	Kalia Love Jones	
2021	Windup		
2021	Live Action		
2021	Black Boy Joy	Martina Mossell Lee	
2021	Baldwin Beauty	Thembi Banks	
2021	Gets Good Light	Alejandra Parody	
2021	Home	Franka Potente	
2021	Mr. & Mrs. Ellis	Alan M. Brooks	
2022	Animated		
2022	Us Again	Zach Parrish	
2022	Blush		
2022	Robin Robin	Dan Ojari, Mikey Please	
2022	She Dreams at Sunrise	Camrus Johnson	
2022	Twenty Something	Aphton Corbin	
2022	Live Action		
2022	When The Sun Sets (Lakutshon’ Ilanga)	Phumi Morare	
2022	Aurinko in Adagio	Elisee Junior St Preux	
2022	Blackout		
2022	The Ice Cream Stop	Raul Perez	
2022	These Final Hours	Lionel Coleman	
2023	Animated		
2023	More Than I Want To Remember	Amy Bench	
2023	I Knew Superman	Dana Crypto	
2023	Supercilious	Cedric L. Williams	
2023	The Boy, the Mole, the Fox and the Horse	Peter Baynton	
2023	We Are Here	Constanza Castro, Domenica Castro	
2023	Live Action		
2023	Dear Mama...	Winter Dunn	
2023	Fannie	Christine Swanson	
2023	Fathead	C. Craig Patterson	
2023	Incomplete		
2023	Pens & Pencils	Gia-Rayne Harris	
2024	Animated		
2024	Lil' Ruby	Bartek Kik	
2024	Blueberry		
2024	Bridges		
2024	Burning Rubber	Chris Fequiere	
2024	Ego' Curse		
2024	Live Action		
2024	The After	Misan Harriman	
2024	Flower		
2024	Gaps		
2024	Lucille		
2024	Rocky Road on Channel Three	James Rogers III	
2024	Documentary Motion Picture		
2024	Black Girls Play: The Story of Hand Games	Joe Brewster, Michèle Stephenson	
2024	Alive in Bronze: Huey P. Newton	A.K. Sandhu	
2024	Birthing a Nation: The Resistance of Mary Gaffney	Nazenet Habtezghi	
2024	Freshwater		
2024	Ifine: Beauty	Ebony Gilbert, Adisa Jones	
2025	Animated		
2025	Peanut Headz: Black History Toonz “Jackie Robinson”	Jason Fleurant	
2025	if(fy)		
2025	Nate & John	Jumai Yusuf	
2025	Self		
2025	Walk in the Light	Princella Smith	
2025	Live Action		
2025	Superman Doesn't Steal	Tamika Lamison	
2025	Chocolate with Sprinkles	Huriyyah Muhammad	
2025	Definitely Not a Monster	Brea Angelo	
2025	If They Took Us Back	Holly Charles	
2025	My Brother & Me	Ryan DeForeest	
2025	Documentary Motion Picture		
2025	How to Sue the Klan	John Beder	
2025	Camille A. Brown: Giant Steps	Shellee Haynesworth and Michelle Parkerson	
2025	Danielle Scott: Ancestral Call	Tetiana Anderson, Sonia Kennebeck	
2025	Judging Juries	Abby Ginzberg	
2025	Silent Killer		
2026	Animated		
2026	ASALI: Power of the Pollinators	Maya S. Penn	
2026	Black Man, Black Man	Frank E. Abney III	
2026	Captain Zero: Into the Abyss Part II	Z Cher-Aimé	
2026	Jazzy Bells	Dara Frazier	
2026	Wednesdays with Gramps	Chris and Justin Copeland	
2026	Live Action		
2026	ADO		
2026	Before You Let Go	Jalen Blot	
2026	Best Eyes	Kira Powell	
2026	Ella		
2026	Food for the Soul	Chisom Chieke	
2026	Documentary Motion Picture		
2026	Black Longevity	Geneva Peschka	
2026	CIRILO, A Legacy Untold	Justin O. Cooper	
2026	Freeman Vines	Tim Kirkman, Andre Robert Lee	
2026	Masaka Kids, a Rhythm Within	Moses Bwayo and David Vieira Lopez	
2026	The Ebony Canal: A Story of Black Infant Health	Emmai Alaquiva	
