= How I Spent My Summer Vacation =

How I Spent My Summer Vacation may refer to:

- How I Spent My Summer Vacation (album), a 2001 album by the Bouncing Souls
- How I Spent My Summer Vacation (1967 film), an American television film
- How I Spent My Summer Vacation (1997 film), an American romantic comedy film
- How I Spent My Summer Vacation (2012 film) or Get the Gringo, an American crime thriller film

== See also ==
- "How I Spent My Strummer Vacation", a 2002 episode of The Simpsons
- Tiny Toon Adventures: How I Spent My Vacation, a 1992 American animated film
