= The Black Ghiandola =

- Promotional poster
- Directed by: Sam Raimi; Catherine Hardwicke; Theodore Melfi
- Written by: Anthony Conti; Scott Kosar; Wash Westmoreland (Note: Westmoreland provided additional writing.)
- Produced by: Tamika Lamison; Bettina Fisher; Adele Jones
- Starring: Anthony Conti; J. K. Simmons; Laura Dern; David Lynch; Richard Chamberlain; Johnny Depp
- Cinematography: Marco Fargnoli; Mark Williams
- Edited by: Lisa Robinson
- Music by: Trent Reznor; Atticus Ross
- Production company: Make a Film Foundation
- Release date: April 22, 2017
- Running time: 18 minutes
- Language: English

The Black Ghiandola is a 2017 American short zombie horror film directed by Sam Raimi, Catherine Hardwicke, and Theodore Melfi from a screenplay by Anthony Conti and Scott Kosar, with additional writing by Wash Westmoreland. It stars Conti alongside J. K. Simmons, Laura Dern, David Lynch, Richard Chamberlain, and Johnny Depp.

== Plot ==
After his family has been killed in a zombie apocalypse, a young man risks his life to save a young woman he has grown to love.

== Cast ==
- Anthony Conti as Jacob Aceto
- J. K. Simmons as Ralph Aceto
- Laura Dern as Doctor
- David Lynch as Man In Black
- Richard Chamberlain as Creepy Oncologist
- Johnny Depp as Nuclear Med Tech
- Jade Pettyjohn as Bri Alonso
- Chad L. Coleman as Tanner Alonso
- Keith Allan as Jonathan King
- Penelope Ann Miller as Ghiandola Anita Aceto

== Production ==
The Black Ghiandola was produced by the Make a Film Foundation to realize an idea by Anthony Conti, a 16-year-old with stage IV adrenal cortical cancer. Sam Raimi, Catherine Hardwicke, and Theodore Melfi co-directed the film, which Conti co-wrote with Scott Kosar; additional writing was provided by Wash Westmoreland. Conti starred alongside an ensemble cast including J. K. Simmons, Laura Dern, David Lynch, Richard Chamberlain, Johnny Depp, Jade Pettyjohn, Chad L. Coleman, Keith Allan, and Penelope Ann Miller. The score was composed by Trent Reznor and Atticus Ross.

== Release ==
The Black Ghiandola was screened at the 2017 Oceanside International Film Festival.
