= Quarry (TV series) =

American crime drama television series

- Genre: Action; Crime drama; Neo-noir; Crime thriller
- Created by: Graham Gordy; Michael D. Fuller
- Based on: Quarry by Max Allan Collins
- Written by: Graham Gordy; Michael D. Fuller; Jennifer Schuur; Max Allan Collins
- Directed by: Greg Yaitanes
- Starring: Logan Marshall-Green; Jodi Balfour; Damon Herriman; Edoardo Ballerini; Nikki Amuka-Bird; Aoibhinn McGinnity; Mustafa Shakir; Peter Mullan
- Composer: Kris Dirksen
- Country of origin: United States
- Original language: English
- No. of seasons: 1
- No. of episodes: 8

Production
- Executive producers: Greg Yaitanes; Steve Golin; Graham Gordy; Michael D. Fuller; Matt DeRoss; David Kanter; Max Allan Collins; Ken F. Levin
- Producer: Alan Blomquist
- Production locations: Tennessee; Mississippi; Louisiana
- Cinematography: Pepe Avila Del Pino
- Editors: Donn Aron; Doc Crotzer
- Camera setup: Single-camera
- Running time: 48–81 minutes
- Production companies: Anonymous Content; Night Sky Productions; One Olive

Original release
- Network: Cinemax
- Release: September 9 – October 28, 2016

Quarry is an American neo-noir crime drama television series based on the novels of Max Allan Collins about a hired assassin. An eight-episode first season was ordered by Cinemax in February 2015. The series was created for television by Graham Gordy and Michael D. Fuller and was directed by Greg Yaitanes. While the series' main setting is Memphis, it was filmed in both Memphis and New Orleans. The series premiered on Cinemax on September 9, 2016. In May 2017, it was announced that the series had been canceled.

Quarry is the story of Mac Conway, a Marine who returns home to Memphis from Vietnam in 1972 and finds himself shunned by those he loves and demonized by the public. As he struggles to cope with his experiences at war, Conway is drawn into a network of killing and corruption that spans the length of the Mississippi River.

== Cast and characters ==
=== Main ===
- Logan Marshall-Green as Lloyd McKinnon 'Mac' Conway, Jr. / Quarry, a Marine who returns home to Memphis from two tours in Vietnam
- Jodi Balfour as Joni Conway, Mac's wife and a reporter for a Memphis newspaper.
- Damon Herriman as Buddy
- Edoardo Ballerini as Karl
- Nikki Amuka-Bird as Ruth Solomon, a close friend of Joni and wife of Arthur Solomon
- Aoibhinn McGinnity as Mary
- Mustafa Shakir as Moses, a henchman of The Broker.
- Peter Mullan as The Broker

=== Supporting ===
- Jamie Hector as Arthur Solomon, Mac's best friend who also served in the Marines during the Vietnam War and Ruth's husband.
- Skipp Sudduth as Lloyd, Mac's father.
- Kurt Yaeger as Suggs
- Happy Anderson as Detective Vern Ratliff
- Josh Randall as Detective Tommy Olsen, a member of the Memphis Police Department.
- Ólafur Darri Ólafsson as Credence Mason
- Ann Dowd as Naomi, the mother of Buddy.
- Tom Noonan as Oldcastle
- Matt Nable as Thurston
- Joshua J. Williams as Marcus
- Kaley Ronayne as Sandy Williams

== Production ==
Cinemax ordered a pilot in April 2013. Quarry received an eight-episode series order in February 2015 and filming began on March 30, 2015.

== Episodes ==
No.	Title	Directed by	Written by	Original release date	U.S. viewers (millions)
1	"You Don't Miss Your Water"	Greg Yaitanes	Teleplay by : Graham Gordy & Michael D. Fuller	September 9, 2016	0.182
In a flash-forward, Mac Conway kills a man and drags his body into the water. In the present, Mac and his best friend Arthur return to Memphis from Vietnam in 1972. When leaving the airport, they are swarmed by angry protestors for their presumed involvement in a massacre in Vietnam. Mac goes home and surprises his wife Joni and is welcomed back. Both Mac and Arthur have a difficult time finding employment, but Arthur eventually lands a job making furniture. At night, while Joni is away, Mac is approached by a man known as "The Broker" and his associate Karl in his home. Mac had been surveyed by Buddy, a scout working for The Broker. The Broker offers him $30,000 to be a contract killer, but Mac declines. While out with Arthur, Mac learns Arthur took the offer from The Broker. Mac acts as Arthur's lookout on his first job, but Arthur is blindsided and killed by a man guarding their target, Suggs. Mac rushes in and kills the shooter, but Suggs escapes. After Arthur's memorial service, Mac meets with The Broker in a quarry, where The Broker tells Mac he must work off Arthur's $30,000 debt. Mac's first target ends up being Cliff, a co-worker having an affair with Joni (a fact The Broker already knew). Mac goes to Cliff's house and finds a record of his that had been missing, and after a brief conversation, kicks the car's jack from underneath, crushing him. Joni wakes up to hear the missing record playing, realizing that Mac knows about her adultery, and the two look at each other in silence.
2	"Figure Four"	Greg Yaitanes	Michael D. Fuller & Graham Gordy	September 16, 2016	0.173
Detectives Tommy Olsen and Vern Ratliff receive a call about a dead body and go the scene. Joni and her co-worker are driving to Cliff's house to pick him up for work then they spot the police. Joni insists on leaving quickly, and Tommy notices them driving off. Mac meets Buddy at a bar asking advice on what to do next and later visits Ruth, Arthur's widow, offering her money and help, but she declines. Mac goes to his father's house, hoping to ask for money, but is welcomed by his stepmother who's not happy to see him. Frustrated and drunk, he goes home and tosses his and Joni's bed. Joni comes home to find the house in shambles and Mac lying on the floor drunk. She locks the bedroom door on him and he pounds on the door. She finds a knife on the ground and hides it in her purse. Mac leaves and goes to a strip club where he asks Gwen, the bartender about a one-legged man; they also flirt. The two detectives question Joni at work, where she tells them they were just friends. She later removes a cassette tape from Cliff's desk. At the diner, Ruth serves a new customer, Moses. Later, Moses enters and searches her home. Buddy takes Mac with him to a meeting with a gunrunner and it quickly goes sideways, resulting in a bloody shootout. After killing the men, Buddy and Mac clean up the evidence and Mac's debt is reduced to $25,000. Mac goes to Gwen's house where they have sex. Suggs, who has been tailing Mac the entire time, knocks on the door, knowing Joni is alone.
3	"A Mouthful of Splinters"	Greg Yaitanes	Graham Gordy & Michael D. Fuller	September 23, 2016	0.204
Suggs kidnaps Joni and leaves a bloody message for Mac on the bathroom mirror, "I have your wife". Suggs calls Mac and tells him he wants $20,000 to return Joni. Mac begins to panic and leaves a message for The Broker asking for help. Mac meets with The Broker and Karl, and Mac threatens to go to the cops, but The Broker suggests the evidence of Joni's disappearance would not help Mac. Mac pleads for help and The Broker eventually agrees. At the police station, Tommy informs Cliff's sister Sandy that his death has been ruled an accident as drugs and alcohol were found in his system. Tommy still wants to pursue the investigation but his superiors tell him it's over. Suggs has Joni tied up in a small shack on a lake and he tells her that Mac cheated on her and how violently he killed a man. Joni lies and tells him she has her period, and asks to retrieve a tampon from her purse. She goes to the bathroom and retrieves a knife she previously took from home and hides it in her dress. After tying and gagging her, he takes off in a motorboat. Buddy is patched up by his mom from the prior gunfight and reveals he doesn't want to do this kind of work anymore. The Broker meets with Moses and Moses tells him he didn't find Arthur's kit of money. Karl gives Mac $20,000 for Joni's ransom. With Suggs gone, Joni begins to cut her ties with the knife. Suggs returns to find her lying on the ground and when he checks on her, Joni attacks him. They fight and end up both crashing through the door into the water. Joni is able to escape on the motorboat. While preparing to meet with Suggs, Mac receives a call from Joni. Mac picks her up at a shop she broke into for safety. Joni demands they return home, but Mac says no as it's still too dangerous. Mac returns the money to Karl and swaps cars.
4	"Seldom Realized"	Greg Yaitanes	Michael D. Fuller & Graham Gordy	September 30, 2016	0.184
Mac tells Karl to find Suggs so he and Joni can return home. Over the next few days, with the medal run of Mark Spitz, then the horror of the Munich massacre, playing out in the background, Mac and Joni hide out in a motel. Mac quickly becomes suspicious of all the guests, but befriends the manager. Mac and Joni get into an argument after he tells her she wouldn't be a good mother. Suggs, pretending to be a detective, shows up at Joni's office and talks to the receptionist, eventually tracking the phone number she called in sick from. When Joni asks Mac why he reenlisted, she is furious when he says his men needed him more than she did. She later retaliates by admitting she slept with Cliff. Mac gets suspicious of one of the male guests, eventually attacking the man inside his motel room, only to discover he's just an encyclopedia salesmen. Suggs finds the motel, kills the manager and attacks Mac in his room, but a woman arrives and kills Suggs. Back at home, Mac reveals the truth to Joni about being a contract killer for The Broker, who probably sent the women who rescued them from Suggs.
5	"Coffee Blues"	Greg Yaitanes	Jennifer Schuur	October 7, 2016	0.157
Mac asks his dad for a $4,000 loan in attempt to get his and Joni's life back on track. His dad originally says no thinking Mac is involved in gambling or drugs, but when Mac storms off, he tells Mac "Let me see what I can do". Detective Tommy Olsen believes Mac is connected to Cliff's death, so he asks Sandy if she knows the name "Joni Conway". She doesn't, but knows that Cliff was involved with various women at the newspaper office. A mob of white men stop a bus of black students (including Ruth's son Marcus) who are on their way to the desegregated school, and one of the men takes one of the students off and viciously beats him. The Broker takes Mac out to a party in the country on an old plantation. Mac asks why he's there and The Broker points to a man, Credence Mason, that he wants killed. However, The Broker later tells him he was joking. Later, Karl is seen tracking that same man. Eugene Lindwood, the man who attacked the black student, is arrested, as Ruth and Marcus watch on TV. Mac wonders into the main house on the plantation and discovers The Broker conducting a business transaction with other men. Mac then has another one of his recurring hallucinations where he sees a man in a Vietnamese mask. The next morning, Mac and The Broker eat breakfast at a diner, and The Broker asks Mac what Joni knows. Mac assures him she doesn't know anything. The Broker reduces Mac debt by $1,000 and drops him off at home. At home, Mac finds an envelope with $100 from his dad.
6	"His Deeds Were Scattered"	Greg Yaitanes	Max Allan Collins	October 14, 2016	0.165
In the middle of the night, Mac runs into streets with a shotgun believing there's a threat. Joni runs outside to get him. Karl listens to recordings of Eugene Linwood talking with Credence Mason about a drug deal. At a club, Buddy confronts his ex, but is rejected. The detectives receive a call about a body with one leg and it is confirmed to be Suggs. Moses continues to get closer to Ruth. Mac meets with The Broker, and gives him his next target: Eugene Linwood. A mandatory citywide curfew is enacted due to the recent racial violence and Lindwood being released from prison. Joni has Mac's dad give an appraisal for their house. She wants to show the house, but without Mac knowing. Mac follows Lindwood to a school bus parking lot, where Lindwood is planting an explosive device under one of the seats. Mac beats him unconscious and shoots the explosive device until it explodes the bus in flames with Linwood inside. Mac tells The Broker the job is done and more of his debt is reduced with the Broker revealed to be the client.
7	"Carnival of Souls"	Greg Yaitanes	Graham Gordy & Michael D. Fuller	October 21, 2016	0.198
Mac is angry at Joni for putting the house up for auction without his knowledge. Detective Tommy Olsen can't let go of the Cliff Williams murder and believes Mac is somehow connected to it. Karl kills two of Credence Mason's crew and takes their stash of heroin. Marcus finds the bag of money his dad received from The Broker underneath the bathroom sink, but keeps it to himself. Buddy goes to The Broker and offers to be the sole gun supplier, instead of a middle man. The Broker says they can discuss this issue at a later time. The Broker has Mac and Buddy go after Mason, the next target. Mac and Buddy's cover is blown while they're scouting Mason and his crew at their hideout, a carnival and arcade. They drive off and cut their scouting phase short, and plan on finishing the job later that night. During an open house, The Broker goes to the Conway house pretending to be a curious neighbor and talks with Joni. He learns that they might be moving. Mac and Buddy get the location of Mason's heroin stash from one of his men after they break into his home. Buddy kills the man after getting the information. A worried Joni calls Mac thinking she saw someone outside their house and Mac rushes home. She realizing it was probably nothing. When Mac leaves to rejoin Buddy, he is followed by Tommy. Mac and Buddy arrive at the arcade and split up, however Mac is stopped by Tommy pointing his gun at him.
8	"nước chảy đá mòn"	Greg Yaitanes	Michael D. Fuller & Graham Gordy	October 28, 2016	0.178
A shootout occurs at the carnival and Tommy is shot in the head and Mac kills Credence Mason. Later, Mac's father tells Mac and Joni that they have an offer on the house, but Joni doesn't want to sell. Mac's step-mother accuses them of just wanting money from them. She gives them money to stay out of their lives. Mac gets a job selling pools. At Ruth's home, when everybody is asleep, Moses approaches Marcus in his room with a gun, who tells him where the money is hidden. Moses takes the money and leaves. Buddy questions what he's doing with his life and is later assaulted and robbed by several men after trying to pick up another man. Ten months earlier in Vietnam, Mac, Arthur and the other men receive orders from their platoon leader, Capt. Thurston to head to the village of Quan Thang that has stockpiles of weapons. All hell breaks lose in the village with several civilians killed and burned alive from napalm as the soldiers fight some Viet Cong. Mac throws a grenade in a hidden tunnel, which turns out to be hiding women and children. Most of the men are stunned at what happened and questioning it. There are no weapons, just fishing supplies. In the present, Mac goes to a bar to meet The Broker to finish paying his debt, however, he sees Thurston and realizes it's not a coincidence. Mac questions him about Quan Thang. When Thurston leaves the bar, Mac follows him and they get into a fight. The fight leads to a river and Mac shoots him and drags his body into the water. Mac meets with The Broker at the quarry and pays his final debt, telling him he's done. However, The Broker has another assignment for him and hands him a dopp kit. In the past, Thurston meets with The Broker at Quan Thang, and head into the jungle, revealing a field of opium poppies. In the present, Mac sits on the bank of the Mississippi River looking at the contents of the dopp kit, and then strips down and sets off to swim across the river (which he had bet Arthur he could do).

== Reception ==
The series received generally positive reviews from television critics. On the review aggregation website Rotten Tomatoes, it has an approval rating of 78%, based on 27 reviews, with an average rating of 7.1/10. The site's critical consensus is, "Quarry's distinctive setting and intriguing characters are just enough to offset a bleak narrative that struggles to make consistently compelling use of its assets." Metacritic, which uses a normalized rating, gave it a score of 72 out of 100, based on 15 critics, indicating "generally favorable reviews".

== Home media ==
The first season was released on Blu-ray and DVD on February 14, 2017.
