= E. Roger Mitchell =

American actor (born 1971)

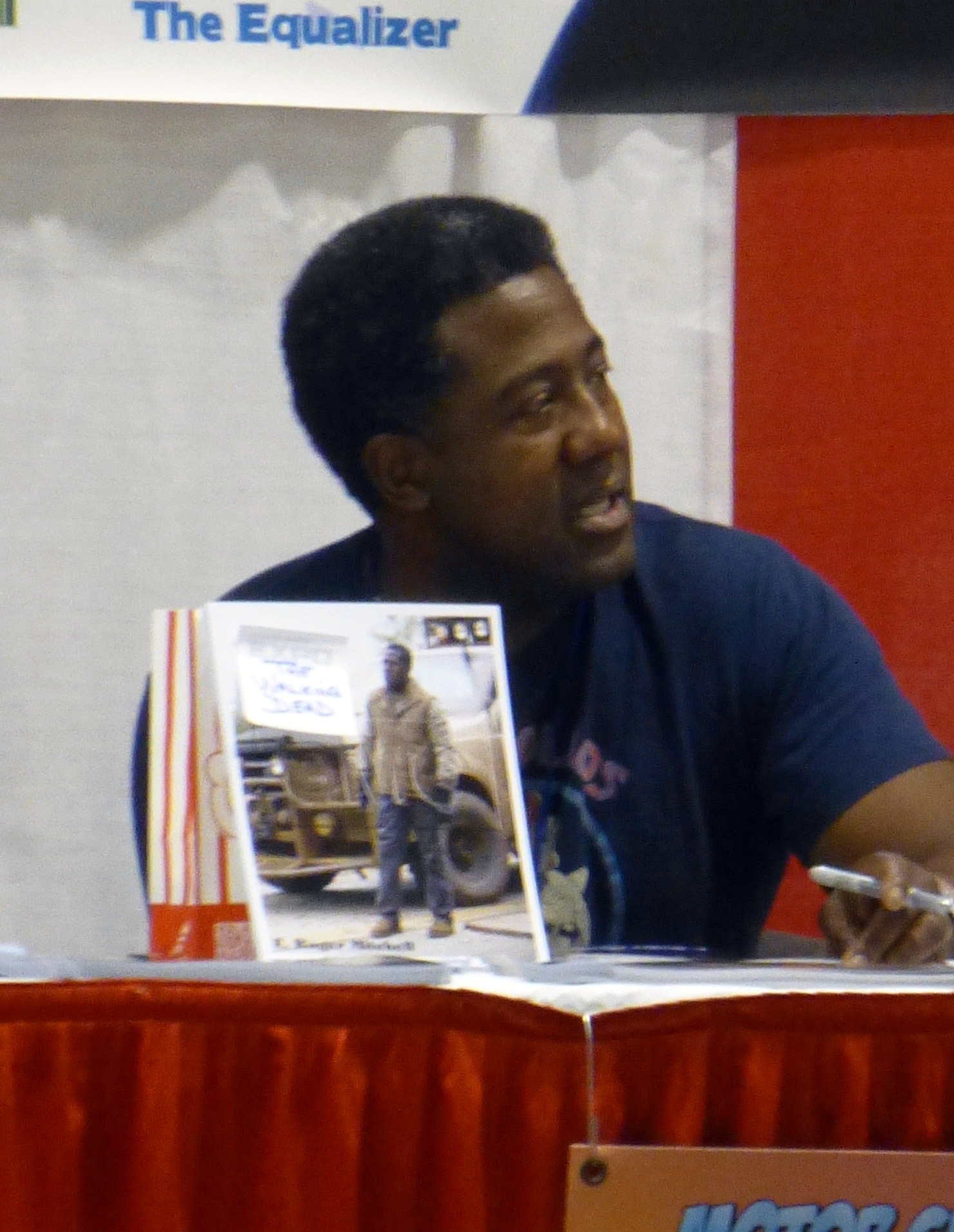
- Mitchell at Motor City Comic Con in 2015
- Born: February 18, 1971 (age 55); Miami, Florida, U.S.
- Education: Claflin University (B.A.); City University of New York (M.F.A)
- Occupation: Actor
- Years active: 1997–present

E. Roger Mitchell (born February 18, 1971) is an American actor. He has had several major roles, including Chaff in Hunger Games: Catching Fire (2013), Detective Sergeant Morris in American Woman (2018), and Paul on The Walking Dead; as well as television roles on The Shield, One Tree Hill, and as Carlton Pettiway on The Quad.

== Early life ==
Mitchell was born in Miami, Florida. He graduated in 1993 from Claflin University in South Carolina with B.A.s in English and Drama. He was named in the Who's Who Among Americas Colleges and Universities in 1992. Mitchell later studied at Alliance Theatre Professional Actor Internship and earned a Master of Fine Arts from City University of New York's Brooklyn campus in 1999.

== Career ==
Mitchell began his acting career in 1997 with his role in the film Raney. The same year, he went on to play Joseph in the comedy film How I Spent My Summer Vacation. In 2000, he portrayed the character Aaron in the film The Legend of Bagger Vance, featuring Will Smith, Charlize Theron and Matt Damon. In 2013, he appeared as Chaff in The Hunger Games: Catching Fire. In 2017, he appeared as Agent Craig McCall in the autobiographical drama film American Made, featuring Tom Cruise, Domhnall Gleeson, Sarah Wright, Jesse Plemmons, Jayma Mays and Alejandro Edda, which is distributed by Universal Pictures and directed by Doug Liman.

He has also made guest appearances on several television shows, including NCIS, House of Payne, Past Life, Nashville, Drop Dead Diva, The Rickey Smiley Show, Being Mary Jane, Survivor's Remorse, and Powers.

== Filmography ==
=== Film ===
Year	Title	Role	Notes
1997	Raney	Charlie	
1997	How I Spent My Summer Vacation	Joseph	
2000	The Legend of Bagger Vance	Aaron	
2001	Boycott	Bob Phillips	TV movie
2001	Losing Grace	Chuck	
2003	Kings County	Drury	
2003	S.W.A.T.	FBI Agent Kirkland	
2003	Party Animals	New Boyfriend	Short
2005	Diary of a Mad Black Woman	Kalvin	
2005	Warm Springs	Pete Collier	TV movie
2006	The Last Adam	Surgeon	
2006	Trust	Myles Rome	
2006	Last Sunset	Officer Jones	
2007	Daddy's Little Girls	Joe's Criminal Lawyer	
2007	NY's Dirty Laundry	Mike	
2009	Jordyn & Julia	Tyrone	Short
2009	The Open Road	TSA Manager	
2009	The Driven	Charles Rutherford	Short
2010	Blood Done Sign My Name	William Burgwyn	
2010	The Crazies	Fire Chief Tom	
2011	World Invasion: Battle Los Angeles	Company Captain	
2011	Battle	J.T.	
2011	Contagion	Driver	
2012	A Smile as Big as the Moon	Principal Tom Keller	TV movie
2012	Hornet's Nest	Mayor Search	TV movie
2012	The Next Day	Jake	
2012	Crossing	Henry	Short
2012	Flight	Craig Matson	
2013	The Spectacular Now	Doctor	
2013	John Henry and the Railroad	John Henry	Short
2013	The Last Exorcism: God Asks. The Devil Commands	Jeffrey	
2013	The Watsons Go to Birmingham	Mr. Williams	TV movie
2013	CrazySexyCool: The TLC Story	Hospital Doctor	TV movie
2013	The Hunger Games: Catching Fire	Chaff	
2013	Anchorman 2: The Legend Continues	Linda's Brother	
2013	The Echo Construct	Detective Carter Phipps	Short
2014	Need for Speed	Detective #1	
2014	Comeback Dad	Marvin	
2014	The Equalizer	FBI Agent Mosley, The Lead Investigator	
2014	Kill the Messenger	Detective	
2014	Selma	Frederick Reese	
2014	Line of Sight	GBI Agent	TV movie
2015	Captive	Sergeant Teasley	
2015	Goosebumps	The Mayor	
2015	Blackhats	Mosis	
2015	Curveball	Coach Patterson	
2015	Across the Tracks	Daddy	Short
2016	The 5th Wave	White House Spokesman	
2016	Triple 9	Smith	
2016	Definitely Divorcing	Aaron	
2016	Cell	Roscoe	
2016	Eternity Hill	Lieutenant Henson	
2016	Sully	ATC #1	
2017	Love by Chance	Frank Moreland	
2017	2016	Ross	
2017	All Eyez on Me	Tupac's Attorney	
2017	American Made	Agent Craig McCall	
2017	A Summer's Day	Tony	Short
2018	American Woman	Detective Sergeant Morris	
2018	A Father's Love	Coach Stevens	Short
2018	Invasion	Mims	Short
2019	Full Count	Sheriff Darden	
2020	Second Samuel	U.S. Simpson	
2021	Favorite Son	Pastor B.C. Wilson	
2021	The Black Phone	Detective Wright	
2022	Super Turnt	Frank	
2022	A Jazzman's Blues	Buster	
2022	Till	Roy Wilkins	
2023	On a Wing and a Prayer	Brian Norton	
2024	Superman Doesn't Steal	Mr. Winget	Short

=== Television ===
Year	Title	Role	Notes
1998	Mama Flora's Family	Charlie (1912)	TV mini series
2002-2006	The Shield	Lester Hoffman	2 episodes
2003	Threat Matrix	Silo Tech #2	Episode: "Pilot"
2003	NCIS	M.P	Episode: "Minimum Security"
2004	One Tree Hill	Technician	Episode: "We Might as Well Be Strangers"
2005	Surface	Kenny	Episode: "Episode #1.4"
2007	Tyler Perry's House of Payne	Police Officer	Episode: "Busted"
2010	Past Life	Don	Episode: "Gone Daddy Gone"
2012	One Tree Hill	Detective Colvin	2 episodes
2012	Coma	Detective Thompson	Episode: "Part Two"
2012	Nashville	Billy	Episode: "Someday You'll Call My Name"
2013	The Walking Dead	Paul	2 episodes
2013	Drop Dead Diva	Mr. Beaty	Episode: "The Kiss"
2014	The Originals	Kevin	Episode: "The Battle of New Orleans"
2014	The Rickey Smiley Show	Officer Ray	Episode: "The Defender"
2014	Survivor's Remorse	Ferris Murphy	Episode: "The Decisions"
2014–2015	Devious Maids	Detective Figueroa	Guest: season 2, recurring cast: season 3
2015	Being Mary Jane	Detective Daniel	Episode: "Freedom"
2015	Powers	Blue Magma	Episode: "Mickey Rooney Cries No More"
2015	Complications	Truck Driver Mark	Episode: "Critical Condition"
2016	Born Again Virgin	-	Episode: "Mama-Pause"
2016	Saints & Sinners	-	Episode: "Don't Go"
2016	Containment	OPS Officer Jim Blake	Episode: "Path to Paradise"
2017–2018	The Quad	Carlton Pettiway	Main cast
2019	Ambitions	Marvin Barnes	Recurring cast
2019	Tales	Pastor	Episode: "I Gave You Power"
2020	Terror Lake Drive	Arnez	Recurring cast
2020-2021	The Oval	Jake Shields	Recurring cast: season 1-2
2020-2021	Outer Banks	Heyward	Recurring cast
2021	Swagger	Glenn	Episode: "Mano a Mano"
2022	Our Kind of People	Detective	Episode: "Just Desserts"
