= Superman Doesn't Steal =

American short film 2024

- Theatrical release poster
- Directed by: Tamika Lamison
- Written by: Tamika Lamison
- Produced by: Tamika Lamison; Chris Beal; Dominique Deleon; Carol Ann Shine
- Starring: Jordyn McIntosh; Ellis Hobbs IV; Mustafa Shakir; E. Roger Mitchell
- Cinematography: Erin G. Wesley
- Edited by: Shandra Barrera; Rich Gonzalez; Chancler Haynes
- Music by: Sahil Jindal
- Production companies: Maktub Media Entertainment; Durable Goods
- Release date: January 10, 2024
- Running time: 19 minutes
- Country: United States
- Language: English

Superman Doesn't Steal is a 2024 coming-of-age short drama film, produced by Tamika Lamison and commissioned by Maktub Media Entertainment. It is based on true events and is set during the 1970s Atlanta child murders, following the story of a nine-year-old girl, Harriet, and her brother, who are fascinated with superheroes.

The cast includes Jordyn McIntosh, Mustafa Shakir, Tamika Lamison, Ellis Hobbs IV, E. Roger Mitchell and Kellen Boyle.

Superman Doesn't was featured at the Cleveland International Film Festival and the Tallahassee Film Festival and was released globally on January 10, 2024. The film won seven awards. Among its accolades, it was recognized with the Outstanding Short Form award at the 56th NAACP Image Awards in 2025 and Pan African Film Festival awards.

== Plot ==
In Atlanta in the late 1970s, amid the eerie atmosphere of the Atlanta Child Murders. Harriet is a cheerful 9-year-old girl, and her older brother Jackson shares her passion and curiosity for the world of superheroes.

But soon, their childhood passion is replaced by harsh reality when shocking events cause severe trauma to their family. The children’s once-simple world is disturbed, and they are left with nothing but hard choices and difficult situations. Harriet and Jackson cope with changing perceptions of right and wrong.

Through suffering and realization, the two learn about heroes and villains, not in comic books but in real life.

== Cast ==
- Jordyn McIntosh as Harriet Riddick
- Ellis Hobbs IV as Jackson Riddick
- Tamika Lamison as Betty Riddick
- Mustafa Shakir as Gil Riddick
- E. Roger Mitchell as Mr. Winget
- Kellen Boyle as Officer Ziegler
- Mark Totty as Officer Friendly

== Background and production ==
Superman Doesn't Steal was written, directed and Produced by Tamika Lamison. The project draws from Lamison’s personal experiences growing up in Atlanta, Georgia during the 1970s, particularly amid the backdrop of the Atlanta Child Murders. The film follows a young girl as she reconsiders her ideas about heroes, villains and herself.

Filming took place in August in Atlanta, Georgia, and was completed in December.

== Release and reception ==
Superman Doesn't Steal has been featured at several film festivals, including the Cleveland International Film Festival and the Tallahassee Film Festival. It received positive attention for its storytelling and thematic resonance, particularly in its portrayal of childhood, race, and justice.

== Awards and nominations ==
Year	Award	Category	Result	Ref
2025	Image Awards (NAACP)	Outstanding Short Form	Won	
2025	Cameroon International Film Festival	Best short International film	Won	
2024	Pan African Film Festival	Best Film	Won	
2024	Septimius Awards	Best Short Film	Won	
2024	Tallahassee Film Festival	Audience Choice Award	Won	
2024	Chesapeake Film Festival	Best Short Narrative	Won	
2024	Reel Sisters of the Diaspora	Best Director	Won	
2024	Reel Sisters of the Diaspora	Best Narrative Short	Won	
