= RonReaco Lee =

American television and film actor (born 1977)

- Born: August 27, 1976 (age 50); Decatur, Illinois, U.S.
- Education: Stone Mountain High School
- Occupation: Actor
- Years active: 1983–present
- Spouse: Sheana Freeman (m. 2010)
- Children: 2

RonReaco Lee (born August 27, 1976) is an American television and film actor best known for his roles as Tyreke Scott on the ABC/The WB sitcom Sister, Sister, and as Jamal Woodson on the BET romantic comedy Let's Stay Together. From 2014 to 2017, he starred as Reggie Vaughn in Starz series Survivor's Remorse.

== Career ==
=== Television ===
Lee was born in Decatur, Illinois, and moved to Atlanta, Georgia at age 9. He began his acting career in 1983 as a host of the television show Kid's Beat. His early work consisted of relatively minor roles in films and television, but after being cast as a mute drummer in the 1989 film Glory, his career blossomed.

By the early 1990s, Lee began receiving many guest-starring roles in television shows such In the Heat of the Night. In 1997, he guest-starred in 413 Hope St. and Home Improvement. From 1997 to 1999, RonReaco played the part of the mechanic Tyreke "Ty" Scott in the television series Sister, Sister. On the series, Tyreke was the boyfriend of Tia Landry. At the conclusion of his role as Tyreke, Lee guest-starred on the UPN sitcom Moesha as Tate in the episode "Let's Talk About Sex." In late 2000, RonReaco continued his long string of guest-starring roles on the NBC medical drama ER playing the character of Davis.

In 2002, he guest-starred in Boston Public. Lee was seen in the WB sitcom All About the Andersons and in the FX series The Shield, as well as Monk. In 2005, he received a recurring role as wheelchair user Todd, in NBC's comedy Committed. Lee recurred as Chris on CW's sitcom Girlfriends. He appeared frequently as David on the CBS sitcom Worst Week and played the role of Jason, Emily's husband, on In the Motherhood.

Lee recurred as Julius Grant on the Fox show The Good Guys, and portrayed Jamal in the BET comedy Let's Stay Together from 2011 to 2014. He starred in Burn Notice: The Fall of Sam Axe, a spin-off movie based on the television series Burn Notice. Lee starred as Reggie Vaughn, Cam Calloway's cousin and manager, in the Starz original comedy Survivor's Remorse produced LeBron James. For his work on the series, Lee received two NAACP Image Award nominations for Outstanding Actor in a Comedy Series in 2016 and 2018. He portrayed Gary, an unfaithful teacher cheating on his wife, in First Wives Club. Lee recurred on Queens as the husband of Eve's character.

=== Film ===
Having made his film debut in Glory, Lee next played Omar in The Return of Swamp Thing (1989). He appeared as Chester Sayers in television film Paris Trout (1991).

He also took on a major role as Perry in the film How I Spent My Summer Vacation. In 2001, he appeared in the film Fire & Ice as co-star to Robert Aimes, Jr. That same year, he acted in the independent film Jacked Up alongside Anna Maria Horsford and Bone Thugs-N-Harmony rapper Bizzy Bone. Lee portrayed Ben in Killer Diller (2004).

Lee co-starred as Reggie in Guess Who (2005) with Bernie Mac and Ashton Kutcher. Lee played the character of Blaine in the WB comedy Americanizing Shelley (2007). He portrayed Chuck, a lawyer, in the 2009 Tyler Perry film Madea Goes to Jail. In 2020, Lee appeared as a drug dealer in Coffee & Kareem.

In 2022, he played Miles in a play about HIV/AIDS called What You Don't Know Can Kill You.

Lee co-starred in the Netflix thriller Mea Culpa that was released on February 23, 2024. The film is written and directed by Tyler Perry and stars Kelly Rowland.

== Filmography ==
=== Film ===
Year	Title	Role	Notes
1989	Unconquered	Busboy	TV movie
1989	The Return of Swamp Thing	Omar	
1989	Glory	Mute Drummer Boy	
1991	Career Opportunities	Boy #3	
1991	Paris Trout	Chester Sayers	
1994	Oldest Living Confederate Widow Tells All	Bellhop	
1997	How I Spent My Summer Vacation	Perry	
2001	Fire & Ice	Robert Aimes Jr.	TV movie
2001	Jacked Up	Dre	
2004	Killer Diller	Ben	
2005	Guess Who	Reggie	
2005	Good Vibrations	Steve	Short
2007	Americanizing Shelley	Parminder 'Pammy' Brar	
2007	Eight Days a Week	Nathan Bloom	TV movie
2009	Madea Goes to Jail	Chuck	
2011	Burn Notice: The Fall of Sam Axe	Ben Delaney	TV movie
2014	Love the One You're With	-	TV movie
2016	The Last Punch	Donald 'Nine' Rolles	
2017	We Are Family	Attorney Bray	
2018	Nappily Ever After	Gerard	
2018	Running Out Of Time	Cain	
2020	Coffee & Kareem	Orlando Johnson	
2020	2 Minutes of Fame	Eddie	
2023	Immortal City Records	Eight	
2024	Mea Culpa	Jimmy	
2024	A Very Merry Beauty Salon	Lawrence	TV movie
2025	Duplicity	Kevin	

=== Television ===
Year	Title	Role	Notes
1992	I'll Fly Away	Lugene	Episode: "Cool Winter Blues"
1993	In the Heat of the Night	David Collins	Episode: "Your Own Kind"
1996	Savannah	Pizza Man	Episode: "The Battle of Midway"
1997	413 Hope St.	-	Episode: "Hate Crimes"
1997–99	Sister, Sister	Tyreke Scott	Recurring Cast: Season 5, Main Cast: Season 6
1998	Home Improvement	Billy	Episode: "The Old College Try"
2000	Moesha	Tate	Episode: "Let's Talk About Sex"
2000–01	ER	Davis	Guest: Season 6, Recurring Cast: Season 7
2002	Boston Public	Wesley Poe	Episode: "Chapter Thirty"
2002	Girlfriends	Chris Dennison	Recurring Cast: Season 2, Guest: Season 3
2003–05	The Shield	Taylor Orrs	Recurring Cast: Season 2-3, Guest: Season 4
2004	All About the Andersons	Marcus Thornhill	Recurring Cast
2005	Committed	Todd	Recurring Cast
2007	Monk	Denny Hodges	Episode: "Mr. Monk and the Rapper"
2008	Do Not Disturb	Billy	Episode: "Work Sex"
2008	Chocolate News	Lance Burrows	Episode: "Episode #1.2"
2008–09	Worst Week	David Clayton	Recurring Cast
2009	In the Motherhood	Jason	Main Cast
2010	The Good Guys	Julius Grant	Recurring Cast
2011	Love Bites	Jason	Episode: "Modern Plagues"
2011–14	Let's Stay Together	Jamal Woodson	Main Cast
2012	Fairly Legal	Travis Cleighton	Episode: "Gimme Shelter"
2014–17	Survivor's Remorse	Reggie Vaughn	Main Cast
2015	Complications	Dr. Quentin Harper	Recurring Cast
2017	APB	Special Agent Charlie Vaughn	Episode: "Last Train to Europa"
2017–18	The Quad	Clive Taylor	Guest: Season 1, Recurring Cast: Season 2
2019–22	First Wives Club	Gary Washington	Main Cast
2021	Queens	Jeff Robinson	Recurring Cast
2023–24	The Black Hamptons	Bobby 'The Beast' Boyd	Main Cast: Season 2
2024	The Family Business	Bobby 'The Beast' Boyd	Recurring Cast: Season 5
2024	Fight Night: The Million Dollar Heist	Senator Leroy Johnson	Recurring Cast
2024	FBI: International	Agent Mike Brooks	Episode: "A Leader, Not a Tourist"
2025	Survival of the Thickest	Charles Renee	Recurring Cast: Season 2
2025	Divorced Sistas	William	Main Cast
