= Sahr Ngaujah =

American actor, director (b. 1976)

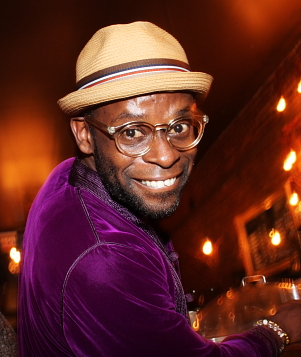
- Ngaujah in June 2012
- Born: Michael Sahr Ngaujah; September 7, 1976 (age 49)
- Occupations: Actor; director

Michael Sahr Ngaujah (born September 7, 1976) is an American theater actor and director. Not long after his parents arrival from Sierra Leone via UK, Sahr was born in Fort Wayne, Indiana. Within five years his family relocated to Atlanta. He spent most of his early career working in experimental theater in Amsterdam. He made his breakthrough for his Tony Award-nominated performance as Fela Kuti in the 2009 Broadway musical Fela! He was nominated for his second Tony Award for his performance Henri de Toulouse-Lautrec in Moulin Rouge! (2019). On screen, he is best known for his roles in ABC's Last Resort (2012) and Netflix's Luke Cage (2018).

== Early life ==
Ngaujah was born to an African-American mother and Sierra Leonean Kono father. Raised in Atlanta, Georgia, he began his career in theatre there with the Youth Ensemble of Atlanta, through 7Stages Theatre in Little 5 Points.

== Career ==
=== 1990s–2007: Early career and Amsterdam ===
As an actor Sahr began his career at age 15. He has worked with Gerrit Timmers (Onafhankelijk Toneel, Rotterdam), Falk Richter (Berlin Schaubühne, Berlin), Del Hamilton (7 Stages, Atlanta), Walter Chakela (Windybrow, Johannesburg), Tim Habeger (PushPush Theater & Film, Atlanta), Made n da Shade/MC (Amsterdam).

Sahr has also maintained a presence in the world of film since the late 1990s, with appearances in Passing Glory (TNT), A Lesson Before Dying (HBO), How I Spent My Summer Vacation (Castle Way), among other films, and more recently in The Signal (Magnolia/Pop Films, 2008), Stomp the Yard (Sony/Rainforest Films – Jan. 2007), and Blood Done (Sign My Name, 2009 release).

Sahr began as a director under the guidance of Freddie Hendricks, working as an assistant director on FH Y.E.A. productions, playing for audiences ranging from the Atlanta Black Arts Festival to the Tweetakt Festival 2000 Antwerp.

During late winter 1999, Ngaujah began the writing process that led to the short story collection Refracting (Dasarts 2004), which inspired the piece Conversations with Ice Amsterdam-BitterZoet (Dasarts 2006). Over Het Ij Festival, Amsterdam, 2007 (Made n Da Shade/Cosmic Theater).

Since relocating to Amsterdam in 2001, Sahr has worked as a theater director and developer with Rotterdam’s Lef and ACT Festival, and as a collaborator with Made n da Shade. He completed his studies at Dasarts in Amsterdam 2006, under the direction of Alida Neslo and Monique Toebosch. Under the primary influence of his work with Freddie Hendricks, as it relates to his creating of original works, integrating music into every layer of the developmental process, together with what he gained through close work with Made n da Shade and their extensive exploration into the weaving of interactive design technology throughout the base fibers of their theatre, Sahr used the laboratory of Dasarts and his encounters with Shu Lea Chang and Germaine Acogny to search for his own unique language and process, in an effort to lay a foundation that will hopefully allow him to all ways break new ground in his personal approach as a Maker.

His work Conversations with Ice deals with the question of value (who decides, who buys), within the context of the global diamond trade, Sierra Leone’s child soldiers, and its links to the Bling sub-culture in hip-hop. Sahr has appeared at speaking engagements at art conferences in Northern Europe (2007–08) about the construction and development of Conversations With Ice, with invitations pending to present this work in Sweden and Tokyo. Ngaujah continues to work with a host of inspiring artist between Europe, Africa, and the U.S. He is actively attempting to help forge stronger links between the artist community between Atlanta and the Netherlands through the development of an art festival called A to the A, celebrating and exploring Global Underground Art and Culture.

=== 2008–present: Broadway and screen acting ===
In November 2008, Ngaujah received the Audelco Award (or "Viv award") for his work on the Off-Broadway musical Fela!, under the direction of Bill T. Jones, which explores the life and inspiration of the Nigerian composer Fela Anikulapo Kuti. He also received a Tony Award nomination and a Laurence Olivier Award nomination for his role in this musical. In December 2008 Fela! The Musical was classified as the #1 theatre show of 2008 in New York, by New York magazine.

In July 2017, Ngaujah lent his voice to the video game Overwatch's hero Doomfist.

In Summer 2018 he appeared in the stage musical Moulin Rouge! as Henri de Toulouse-Lautrec. Moulin Rouge! was scheduled to begin preview performances on June 27, 2018, at the Emerson Colonial Theatre in Boston.

== Personal life ==
For much of the 2000s, he was based in Amsterdam, Netherlands (and briefly London).

== Filmography ==
=== Film ===
Year	Title	Role	Notes
1997	First Time Felon	Smiling Inmate	Television film
1997	How I Spent My Summer Vacation	D'Angelo	
1999	Passing Glory	Lil' Ricky	Television film
1999	A Lesson Before Dying	Brother	Television film
2002	Big Ain't Bad	Clay	
2005	Shi cha qi xiao shi	Orintheus	
2007	Stomp the Yard	Harold	
2007	The Signal	Rod	
2009	The Jailhouse	Cash	
2010	Blood Done Sign My Name	Boo Chavis	
2011	National Theatre Live: Fela!	Fela Kuti	Live broadcast
2015	Freeheld	Father John	
2016	Farewell Meu Armor	Walter	Short film
2016	Money Monster	Yao Appiah COO	
2017	Patti Cake$	O-Z	
2017	Kensho at the Bedfellow	Mosi	
2018	Vox Lux	Sound engineer	

=== Television ===
Year	Title	Role	Notes
2007–2010	House of Payne	Blue	3 episodes
2012–2013	Last Resort	Julian Serrat	13 episodes
2014–2015	The Blacklist	General Yaabari	2 episodes
2015	The Good Wife	Joel Becquet	Episode: "Restraint"
2016	Law & Order: Special Victims Unit	Father Akintola	2 episodes
2018	High Maintenance	Solomon	Episode: "#goalz"
2018	Deception	Oliver Scott	Episode: "Code Act"
2018	Luke Cage	Anansi	8 episodes
2019	Bull	ADA Carter	Episode: "Separate Together"
2020	The Accidental Wolf		2 episodes
2021	Prodigal Son	Darryl	2 episodes
2024	Power Book II: Ghost	Chinedu	2 episodes

=== Theatre ===
Selected credits (2008 on).

Year	Title	Role	Venue	Notes
2008–2012	Fela!	Fela Anikulapo-Kuti	37 Arts Theatre: July – October 2008	Off-Broadway
2008–2012	Fela!	Fela Anikulapo-Kuti	Eugene O'Neill Theatre: October 2009 – October 2010	Broadway
2008–2012	Fela!	Fela Anikulapo-Kuti	World Tour: September 2011 – August 2012	US/Canada
2008–2012	Fela!	Fela Anikulapo-Kuti	Al Hirschfeld Theatre: July – August 2012	Broadway return
2015	The Painted Rocks at Revolver Creek	Jonathon	Romulus Linney Courtyard Theatre: April – June 2015	Off-Broadway
2016	Signature Plays: Drowning / Funnyhouse of a Negro	Roe / Patrice Lumumba	Alice Griffin Jewel Box Theatre: May – June 2016	Off-Broadway
2016	"Master Harold"... and the boys	Willie	Irene Diamond Stage: October – December 2016	Off-Broadway
2018	Mlima's Tale		The Public Theater: March – May 2018	Off-Broadway
2018–present	Moulin Rouge!	Henri de Toulouse-Lautrec	Emerson Colonial Theatre: July – August 2018	Regional
2018–present	Moulin Rouge!	Henri de Toulouse-Lautrec	Al Hirschfeld Theatre: June 2019 – March 2020; September 2021 –	Broadway
2019	Boesman and Lena	Boesman	Alice Griffin Jewel Box Theatre: March – February 2019	Off-Broadway

=== Video games ===
Year	Title	Role	Notes
2016	Overwatch	Doomfist	
2022	Overwatch 2	Doomfist	

=== Podcasts ===
Year	Title	Role	Notes
2021	Tomorrow's Monsters	David Trusedale	Episode: "It's Not The Fall That Kills You"

== Awards and nominations ==
Year	Award	Category	Work	Result	Ref.
2009	Drama Desk Award	Outstanding Actor in a Musical	Fela!	Nominated	
2009	Drama League Award	Distinguished Performance	Fela!	Nominated	
2009	Lucille Lortel Award	Outstanding Lead Actor	Fela!	Nominated	
2009	Obie Award	Performance	Fela!	Won	
2010	Tony Award	Best Actor in a Musical	Fela!	Nominated	
2010	Theatre World Award		Fela!	Honoree	
2011	Laurence Olivier Award	Best Actor in a Musical	Fela!	Nominated	
2018	Drama League Award	Distinguished Performance	Mlima’s Tale	Nominated	
2019	Lucille Lortel Award	Outstanding Lead Actor in a Play	Mlima’s Tale	Nominated	
2020	Tony Award	Best Featured Actor in a Musical	Moulin Rouge!	Nominated	
2020	Grammy Award	Best Musical Theater Album	Moulin Rouge!	Nominated	
