= Bushmaster (Marvel Comics) =

Name of two Marvel Comics supervillains

Bushmaster is the name of two supervillains appearing in American comic books published by Marvel Comics. The first was a master criminal, while the second Bushmaster was given superpowers as he had a long, mechanical snake tail grafted to his torso and bionic arms.

Mustafa Shakir portrayed the original version of Bushmaster, John McIver, in the Marvel Cinematic Universe, as part of the second season of the television series Luke Cage.

== Publication history ==
The first Bushmaster (John McIver) first appeared in Iron Fist #15 (September 1977) created by writer Chris Claremont and writer/artist John Byrne. John McIver, known as John Bushmaster, became a Maggia crime boss in Europe and later expanded into the United States. In the United States, he was confronted by Misty Knight, Iron Fist and Power Man. Due to an accident during a fight with Power Man, Bushmaster was transformed into "Unliving metal", which later led to his death.

The second Bushmaster (Quincy McIver), first appeared in Captain America #310 (October 1985), created by Mark Gruenwald and Paul Neary. Quincy McIver, younger brother of John, lost both his arms and legs in a boating accident while trying to avoid the police. The Roxxon Oil Company used their resources to graft bionic arms to Quincy's body and replace his severed legs with a long bionic snake tail, transforming him into Bushmaster. He became a founding member of the Serpent Society, finding acceptance among the team. He would remain loyal to Society leader Sidewinder when Viper took control of the Serpent Society. He was not shown to be a member of Serpent Solutions when the Society was reorganized.

== Fictional character biography ==
=== John McIver ===
Bushmaster

Publication information
- Publisher: Marvel Comics
- First appearance: Iron Fist #15 (Sept. 1977)
- Created by: Chris Claremont; John Byrne

In-story information
- Alter ego: John McIver
- Team affiliations: Maggia
- Notable aliases: John Bushmaster, Power Master
- Abilities: As Bushmaster: Skilled street fighter Superhuman strength and durability As Power Master: Energy absorption

John McIver is a powerful crime boss, criminal financier and organizer, and the brother of Quincy McIver. As a teenager, John and Quincy grew up on an unidentified island in the Caribbean Sea. Unlike Quincy, John was quick and savvy enough to stay out of trouble, despite stealing from local merchants. After John found out that Quincy blurted out that they were brothers to a shopkeeper who had caught him, John gave Quincy a beating. A few nights later, John beat the shopkeeper to death. Years later, John was in the employ of Herve Argosy, working as an enforcer in his extortion business. John got Quincy involved in Argosy's work as well, only for Quincy to lose all four of his limbs to a motorboat propeller on his first mission.

Several years later, John has managed to take over the European branch of the Maggia. As he began to show interest into expanding into the United States starting with New York, he attracted the attention of the FBI, CIA, and Interpol.

At Seagate Prison, Bushmaster coerces Noah Burstein into utilizing the "Power Man" process on him to an even greater extent than what was used on Luke Cage. Cage as Power Man, Iron Fist, Misty Knight, and Colleen Wing battle Bushmaster at Seagate Prison, where Bushmaster proves to be more powerful than Cage. In the course of the battle, Power Man and Bushmaster pierce a chemical vat and are doused in chemicals, which are then electrified by a torn power line. Bushmaster is presumed dead in the resulting explosion.

Bushmaster survives and continues to mutate, transforming into living metal. Bushmaster has his agents capture Noah Burstein's wife Emma to force Noah to reverse the process. His agents also capture Power Man and bring him to Seagate to be used for experimentation. When Iron Fist arrives to rescue Power Man, Bushmaster attempts to order his men to kill Emma Burstein, but his body disintegrates, leaving only his skeleton behind.

Bushmaster's son Cruz has his remains taken to an island fortress off the coast of St. Croix so that he can have Noah Burstein resolve the safety issues in the "Power Man" process. Cruz Bushmaster has his father's remains and Luke Cage placed in a chamber, which resurrects Bushmaster. Bushmaster proceeds to take over Cruz's body, now calling himself Power Master. Iron Fist arrived and frees Cage from Power Master's grip. Cage then puts a power cable into Power Master, who continuously absorbs its energy. Cage and Iron Fist escape while the fortress explodes.

=== Quincy McIver ===
Bushmaster
- Bushmaster, from Avengers vs. X-Men #0 (May 2012). Art by Frank Cho.

Publication information
- Publisher: Marvel Comics
- First appearance: Captain America #310 (October 1985)
- Created by: Mark Gruenwald; Paul Neary

In-story information
- Alter ego: Quincy McIver
- Team affiliations: Thunderbolts; Serpent Society
- Abilities: Bionic arms; 14-foot-long (4.3 m) super strong snake-like tail; 6-inch (150 mm) "fangs" strapped to his hands with sharp needles that contain a fast-acting poison derived from snake venom

Quincy McIver was born on a Caribbean island and is the younger brother of the first Bushmaster. He became a quadruple amputee when he lost his arms and legs in a boating accident while trying to evade the police underwater.

Shortly later, the Roxxon Oil Company equipped Quincy with bionic arms and a snake-like tail in the place of his lower body. He took the name "Bushmaster" from his deceased brother. Years later, Sidewinder enlists Bushmaster to join the Serpent Society. After Viper takes over the Serpent Society, Bushmaster remains loyal to Sidewinder.

Sidewinder, disillusioned by the betrayals of some of the Serpent Society's members, turns over control of the group to Cobra, with Bushmaster shifting his loyalty to him.

During the 2006 "Civil War" storyline, Bushmaster is among the villains apprehended by Baron Zemo and forced to join the Thunderbolts. He briefly appears along with fellow Serpent Society members King Cobra and Rattler.

As part of the All-New, All-Different Marvel initiative, Bushmaster appears as a member of Viper's Serpent Society under its new name of Serpent Solutions.

== Powers and abilities ==
The first Bushmaster had street-fighting skills. He later went through the same process that gave Luke Cage his powers which gave him superhuman strength and durability. As Power Master, he can absorb energies from other people.

The second Bushmaster was surgically altered by the Roxxon Oil Company and Brand Corporation with bionic prosthetic limbs and a tail. His snake-like bionic tail enables him to move and strike with superhuman strength and speed. He has two 6-inch (150 mm) "fangs" strapped to the back of each of his hands. Each fang is needle sharp at the tips and contain a fast-acting poison derived from snake venom.

== Other versions ==
=== Ultimate Marvel ===
In the Ultimate Marvel universe, Bushmaster is a member of the gang called the Serpent Skulls. He serves as a lieutenant of the group until he is killed by the Scourge of the Underworld.

=== Secret Wars (2015) ===
During the 2015 "Secret Wars" storyline, a zombified version of Quincy McIver / Bushmaster resides in the Battleworld domain of the Deadlands. He is later killed by Janet van Dyne.

== In other media ==
- The Quincy McIver incarnation of Bushmaster makes non-speaking appearances in The Avengers: Earth's Mightiest Heroes. This version resembles an anthropomorphic snake.
- The John McIver incarnation of Bushmaster appears in Luke Cage, portrayed by Mustafa Shakir. This version is Jamaican and the son of Quincy McIver, who was betrayed and killed by his business partners, Mama Mabel and Buggy Stokes. Additionally, John was injured amidst his parents' murder, but was rescued by his uncle Paul "Anansi" Mackintosh, who used nightshade root to save him. In the present, John intends to seek revenge on the Stokes family and take control of Harlem's criminal underworld from Mabel and Buggy's granddaughter Mariah Dillard, gaining control of a Yardies offshoot called the Stylers in the process.
