= Coffee & Kareem =

2020 American action comedy film directed by Michael Dowse

- Official promotional poster
- Directed by: Michael Dowse
- Written by: Shane Mack
- Produced by: Mike Falbo; Ed Helms
- Starring: Ed Helms; Terrence Little Gardenhigh; Betty Gilpin; RonReaco Lee; Andrew Bachelor; David Alan Grier; Taraji P. Henson
- Cinematography: Brian Burgoyne
- Edited by: Daniel Gabbe
- Music by: Joseph Trapanese
- Production company: Pacific Electric Picture Co.
- Distributed by: Netflix
- Release date: April 3, 2020
- Running time: 88 minutes
- Country: United States
- Language: English

Coffee & Kareem is a 2020 American action comedy film directed by Michael Dowse and written by Shane Mack. It stars Ed Helms, Terrence Little Gardenhigh, Betty Gilpin, RonReaco Lee, Andrew Bachelor, David Alan Grier and Taraji P. Henson, and follows a bumbling Detroit cop who must rescue his girlfriend and her 12-year-old son from gangsters after the boy witnesses a murder.

It was released on April 3, 2020, by Netflix. The film received generally negative reviews from critics, who called it an "awkward blend of kid-friendly premise and thoroughly adult humor".

== Plot ==
While police officer James Coffee enjoys his new relationship with Vanessa Manning, her beloved 12-year-old son Kareem plots their break-up.

Attempting to scare away his mom's boyfriend for good, Kareem, whose father (Vanessa's husband) died of cancer, tries to hire criminal fugitive Orlando Johnson to take him out. Before doing so, he both witnesses a shooting and accidentally exposes a secret network of criminal activity involving drugs and dirty cops, which makes his family its latest target. To protect Vanessa, Kareem teams up with Coffee - the partner he never wanted - for a dangerous chase across Detroit, trying to stay alive.

It is revealed that Coffee's Captain Hill and Detective Watts are the bad cops. Watts murders Hill and ultimately kidnaps Vanessa and Kareem. Coffee is able to rescue them, and the cops bust Watts's drug deal, with some help from Johnson, who never really wanted to be in drugs in the first place.

Watts survives the explosion and tries to shoot Coffee, but Vanessa shoots her. Kareem finally admits that he's okay with Coffee dating his mom.

== Cast ==
- Ed Helms as James Coffee
- Terrence Little Gardenhigh as Kareem Manning
- Taraji P. Henson as Vanessa Manning
- Betty Gilpin as Detective Linda Watts
- RonReaco Lee as Orlando Johnson
- Andrew Bachelor as Rodney
- David Alan Grier as Captain Hill

== Production ==
In March 2019, it was announced Ed Helms and Taraji P. Henson joined the cast of the film, with Michael Dowse directing from a screenplay by Shane Mack. Helms and Mike Falbo producing under their Pacific Electric banner, with Netflix distributing. In May 2019, Terrence Little Gardenhigh, Betty Gilpin, Andrew Bachelor, RonReaco Lee and David Alan Grier joined the cast of the film.

=== Filming ===
Principal photography began on April 22, 2019, in British Columbia. It wrapped on June 4.

== Release ==
The movie was digitally released on Netflix on April 3, 2020.

== Reception ==
On the review aggregator website Rotten Tomatoes, the film holds an approval rating of 21% based on 71 reviews, with an average rating of 3.8/10. The site's critical consensus reads: "An awkward blend of kid-friendly premise and thoroughly adult humor, Coffee & Kareem proves a distinctly unarresting odd couple comedy." On Metacritic, the film has a weighted average score of 35 out of 100, based on 20 critics, indicating "generally unfavorable" reviews.
