= Mustafa Shakir =

American actor (born 1976)

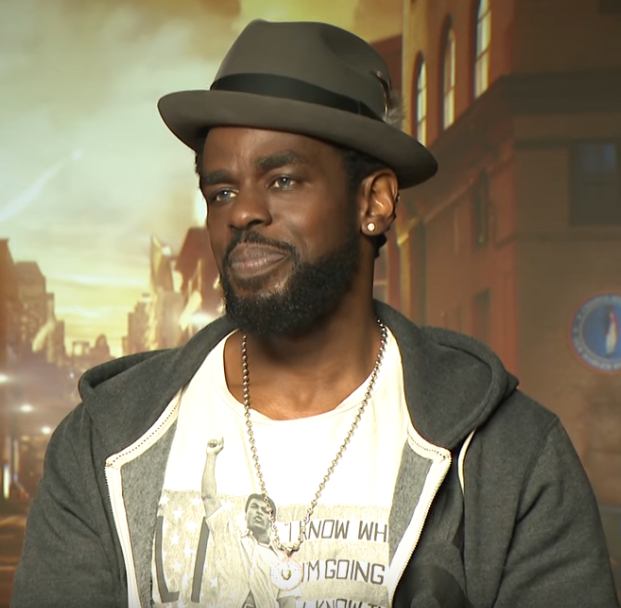
- Shakir in 2018
- Born: August 21, 1976 (age 50); North Carolina, US
- Education: The New School
- Occupation: Actor
- Years active: 1996–present

Mustafa Shakir (born August 21, 1976) is an American actor known for his portrayal as Bushmaster in Marvel's Luke Cage, Big Mike in The Deuce and Jet Black in Cowboy Bebop (2021).

== Biography and career ==
Shakir was born in North Carolina and grew up in Harlem. He attended The New School and graduated in 2001. Before acting, Shakir was a barber.

Shakir earned one of the lead roles in the short lived Quarry and made a guest appearance on Timeless. He had previously auditioned for the roles of Black Lightning in the eponymous television show and M'Baku in Black Panther, but failed to acquire either role. He was cast as John McIver/Bushmaster in the second season of Luke Cage. In 2021, he starred in the Netflix live-action adaptation of Cowboy Bebop as Jet Black.

Shakir is a strict vegan.

== Filmography ==
Film
Year	Title	Role	Notes
2000	Shaft	Protester	Uncredited
2001	Down to Earth	Doorman	Uncredited
2001	3 Ceilings	Doctor	Short
2003	Marci X	Engine Trouble	
2005	The Cavern	Gannon	
2010	Daybreak	—N/a	
2010	Sunset	Dan	Short
2011	Geezas	Jones	
2012	Record/Play	Man	Short
2013	Untitled Symphony	—N/a	Director, writer and producer
2013	The Dark Side of the Earth	Gibson	Short, also writer
2013	Stand By	Alpha Zombie	Short
2014	Noah's Ark	Chicken	Short
2015	The Stream	Marcus	Short
2016	The Grounds	Dominic	
2016	Driving While Black	Malik	
2017	Double Play	Manchi	
2017	Let Them Die Like Lovers	Marko	Short
2017	Fight Your Way Out	Damani Latimore	
2017	Brawl in Cell Block 99	Andre	
2018	Pretenders	Mr. Stanish	
2021	Hide and Seek	Frankie Pascarillo	
2022	Emancipation	Cailloux	
2023	Assassin	Sebastian	
2023	Ghosted	Monte Jackson	
2024	Superman Doesn't Steal	Gil Riddick	Short
2025	Love Hurts	Raven	
2025	Song Sung Blue	Sex Machine	

Television
Year	Title	Role	Notes
1996	New York Undercover	Ronald Taylor	Episode: "Sympathy for the Devil"
1999	Wasteland	Bouncer / Ron	Episodes: "Best Laid Plans", "Double Date"
2001, 2004	Law & Order	Mike / Preston Hubbard	Episodes: "3 Dawg Night", "Gunplay"
2004	Dr. Vegas	Bert	Episode: "Pilot"
2005	House	D'Vontray	Episode: "Acceptance"
2005	Wanted	Simeon Rivers	Episode: "Judas"
2006	Girlfriends	Javon Dennis	4 episodes
2007	Cold Case	Akon Dupree '07	Episode: "It Takes a Village"
2008	Numb3rs	Crew Member #1	Episode: "Pay to Play"
2011	Harry's Law	Bull	Episode: "A Day in the Life"
2012	The Frontier	Armand Rossignol	TV Pilot
2013	Shameless	D'Andre	Episode: "Cascading Failures"
2014	NCIS: Los Angeles	Guard 1	Episode: "Tuhon"
2015	Mighty Med	Ambusher	Episode: "Less Than Hero"
2016	Underground	Edwin	Episode: "The Macon 7"
2016	The Night Of	Victor	4 episodes
2016	Quarry	Moses	Main cast
2016	Timeless	Gregory Hayes	Episode: "The Watergate Tape"
2017	NCIS: New Orleans	Jack Gordon	Episode: "End of the Line"
2017–2019	The Deuce	Big Mike	Recurring; 21 episodes
2018	Luke Cage	John "Bushmaster" McIver	Main cast (Season 2)
2019	American Gods	Baron Samedi	1 episode
2019	Jett	Quinn	4 episodes
2021	Cowboy Bebop	Jet Black	Main cast
