= Survivor's Remorse =

American TV series (2014–17)

- Genre: Comedy drama
- Created by: Mike O'Malley
- Starring: Jessie T. Usher; RonReaco Lee; Erica Ash; Teyonah Parris; Tichina Arnold; Mike Epps
- Composer: Ludwig Göransson
- Country of origin: United States
- Original language: English
- No. of seasons: 4
- No. of episodes: 36

Production
- Executive producers: LeBron James; Mike O'Malley; Tom Werner; Maverick Carter; Paul Wachter; Victor Levin; Hilton Smith
- Producer: Paul Marks
- Production locations: Atlanta, Georgia
- Cinematography: Byron Shah
- Editor: Jason Gourson
- Camera setup: Single-camera
- Running time: 26–32 minutes
- Production companies: Spring Hill Productions; Werner Entertainment; O'Malley Ink

Original release
- Network: Starz
- Release: October 4, 2014 – October 15, 2017

Survivor's Remorse is an American comedy-drama television series created by Mike O'Malley that aired on Starz. It premiered on October 4, 2014, and ended on October 15, 2017. The plot centers around the lives of Cam Calloway (Jessie T. Usher) and his family after he signs a pro-basketball contract and moves his family to Atlanta. The series was produced by NBA player LeBron James. On August 24, 2016, Survivor's Remorse was renewed for a fourth season, which premiered on August 20, 2017. On October 10, 2017, Starz announced that the series would come to an end after its fourth season.

== Cast and characters ==
=== Main cast ===
- Jessie T. Usher as Cam Calloway
- RonReaco Lee as Reggie Vaughn, Cam's cousin
- Erica Ash as Mary Charles "M-Chuck" Calloway, Cam's half-sister
- Teyonah Parris as Missy Vaughn, Reggie's wife
- Tichina Arnold as Cassie Calloway, Cam's mother
- Mike Epps as Uncle Julius (Seasons 1–2)

=== Recurring cast ===
- Chris Bauer as Jimmy Flaherty, owner of the basketball team
- Robert Wu as Da Chen Bao, Cassie's boyfriend
- Meagan Tandy as Allison Pierce, Cam's girlfriend
- Ser'Darius Blain as Jupiter Blackmon, Reggie's client
- Catfish Jean as Squeeze, Cam and Reggie's childhood friend
- Sir Brodie as Pookie, Julius's close friend of the family

=== Guest stars ===
- John Dennis as himself ("Homebound")
- Gerry Callahan as himself ("Homebound")
- LeBron James as himself ("Guts")
- Tom Werner as himself ("Guts")

== Episodes ==
Season	Episodes	Originally released	
Season	Episodes	First released	Last released
1	6	October 4, 2014	November 8, 2014
2	10	August 22, 2015	October 24, 2015
3	10	July 24, 2016	September 25, 2016
4	10	August 20, 2017	October 15, 2017

=== Season 1 (2014) ===
No. overall	No. in season	Title	Directed by	Written by	Original release date	US viewers (millions)
1	1	"In the Offing"	Ken Whittingham	Mike O'Malley	October 4, 2014	0.203
Professional basketball player Cam Calloway signs a contract with Atlanta. Although the new city embraces him, he has to deal with his opportunistic entourage - his sister, mother, cousin and uncle - who take advantage of him and his generosity.
2	2	"On the Carpet"	Ken Whittingham	Mike O'Malley	October 11, 2014	0.201
At a charity gala for an abused child, Cassie reveals too much information about Cam's upbringing. Meanwhile, Uncle Julius poses as a "talent scout" for Cam.
3	3	"How to Build a Brand"	Peter Segal	Story by : Cord Jefferson & Sascha Penn; Teleplay by : Sascha Penn	October 18, 2014	0.186
On the advice of Reggie and Missy, Cam pays a visit to a dying teen (Jacob Latimore) who loves basketball. Meanwhile, Reggie influences Cam to put the entire family on the payroll.
4	4	"The Decisions"	Bradley Buecker	Raphael Jackson, Jr. & Damione Macedon	October 25, 2014	0.161
Missy campaigns to score her husband Reggie membership to a black-funded country club. Meanwhile, Cam searches for a church to support in the area, but the resident pastor surprises him.
5	5	"Out of the Past"	Mike Mariano	Jerome Hairston & Tracy Oliver	November 1, 2014	0.237
Cam and Reggie reconnect with a childhood friend (Romeo Miller) whose career was derailed by prison; Reggie gives Cassie a home-purchasing budget; and Cam considers a shoe endorsement deal.
6	6	"Six"	Victor Levin	Victor Levin	November 8, 2014	0.272
The family grows concern for Reggie when his former girlfriend reaches out to him.

=== Season 2 (2015) ===
No. overall	No. in season	Title	Directed by	Written by	Original release date	US viewers (millions)
7	1	"Grown-Ass Man"	Peter Segal	Mike O'Malley	August 15, 2015 (online); August 22, 2015 (Starz)	0.334
The Calloways upgrade to a spacious new mansion; team owner Jimmy Flaherty attaches serious strings to Cam's max deal.
8	2	"A Time to Punch"	Mike Mariano	Victor Levin & Mike O'Malley	August 29, 2015	0.340
Cam and M-Chuck are scrutinized by a district attorney; Uncle Julius feuds with a neighbor who won't take responsibility for his dog's actions.
9	3	"M.V.P."	Ali LeRoi	Lauren Houseman & Benjamin F. Neivert	September 5, 2015	0.393
Cassie returns to the dating world and her determination to get what she wants sets her on a collison course with Cam; Reggie meets the peculiar and brilliant man who made Flaherty all his money.
10	4	"Homebound"	Iain B. MacDonald	Jerome Hairston & Phil Augusta Jackson	September 12, 2015	0.303
Cam feels the pressure during his first game back in Boston; M-Chuck unearths lingering racial tensions during the family's cultural tour of a plantation.
11	5	"One-Love"	Ken Whittingham	Blake Masters & Jerome Hairston	September 19, 2015	0.329
Reggie meets a college football prospect with a troublesome manager; M-Chuck becomes involved in the life of a pregnant girl.
12	6	"The Dagger"	Victor Levin	Victor Levin	September 26, 2015	0.355
Chen attempts to woo Cassie at a gala to celebrate the launch of Cam's shoe; Cam makes a mistake with a reporter.
13	7	"The Injury"	Bill Johnson	Mike O'Malley	October 3, 2015	0.387
Cam meets a special woman while he contends with a potential career-ending injury; Reggie's representation of Jupiter becomes an exercise in futility.
14	8	"The Date"	Ken Whittingham	Blake Masters & Jerome Hairston	October 10, 2015	0.303
Cam plans a magical first date for Allison; Uncle Julius takes a jaunt with the police and learns how the other half lives; M-Chuck uses her therapy to heap guilt upon her mother.
15	9	"Guts"	Debbie Allen	Victor Levin	October 17, 2015	0.235
Missy is recruited to tutor Jupiter when his draft status is threatened; Cam and Allison's relationship grows, along with Reggie's business ventures.
16	10	"Starts and Stops"	Peter Segal	Mike O'Malley	October 24, 2015	0.324
Reggie has doubts about representing Jupiter; Allison declines Cam's expensive gifts; a crisis rocks the family.

=== Season 3 (2016) ===
No. overall	No. in season	Title	Directed by	Written by	Original release date	US viewers (millions)
17	1	"The Night of the Crash"	Peter Segal	Mike O'Malley	July 24, 2016	0.883
The tragic loss of a loved one leaves the family members with a sudden hole in their lives.
18	2	"The Ritual"	Peter Segal	Mike O'Malley	July 24, 2016	0.883
The Calloways and the Vaughns comfort one another as they navigate their way through the most trying ritual of their lives.
19	3	"The Thank-You Note"	Geeta Patel	Victor Levin	July 31, 2016	1.012
Reggie and Missy argue about the importance of modern manners and the role of social etiquette after they meet a wealthy Atlanta couple.
20	4	"The Age of Umbrage"	Ali LeRoi	Mike O'Malley	August 7, 2016	0.672
A scandal erupts after Cam's words during an interview are taken out of context, leading to the creation of the Calloway Philanthropic Trust.
21	5	"The Photoshoot"	Victoria Mahoney	Ali LeRoi	August 14, 2016	0.781
Media consultant Missy copes with the fallout of a decision at a photo shoot for Cam; Chen and Cassie use technology to close the gap of a long-distance relationship.
22	6	"No Child Left Behind"	Bill Johnson	Victor Levin	August 21, 2016	0.936
Following a DNA test, Cassie meets a new family who helps her experience the traditions of the culture; Cam and Reggie attempt to get rid of Uncle Julius' gun.
23	7	"The Guests"	Ali LeRoi	Story by : Patrick Bierut & Ali LeRoi; Teleplay by : Owen H.M. Smith	August 28, 2016	0.753
Cam and Reggie return to Boston for a wedding; M-Chuck pursues relationships with many different women.
24	8	"Mystery Team"	Millicent Shelton	Story by : Allen Maldonado; Teleplay by : Rachelle R. Williams	September 4, 2016	0.951
Reggie and Flaherty battle over a contract extension for Cam.
25	9	"Second Thoughts"	Mike Mariano	Story by : Marquita J. Robinson; Teleplay by : Benjamin Neivert & Brendan O'Malley	September 18, 2016	0.965
Cam uncovers secrets about his family's past and deals with the fallout.
26	10	"Father's Day"	Victor Levin	Victor Levin	September 25, 2016	0.761
Reggie's father makes a sudden appearance in Atlanta; Cassie meets Chen's parents.

=== Season 4 (2017) ===
No. overall	No. in season	Title	Directed by	Written by	Original release date	US viewers (millions)
27	1	"Fallout"	Mike Mariano	Mike O'Malley	August 20, 2017	0.976
28	2	"Repercussions"	Mike Mariano	Mike O'Malley	August 27, 2017	0.571
29	3	"Closure"	Salli Richardson-Whitfield	Luther M. Mace & Paul Oakley Stovall	September 3, 2017	0.783
30	4	"Feel Free to Comment"	Ali LeRoi	Owen H.M. Smith & Rachelle R. Williams	September 10, 2017	0.388
31	5	"The Gala"	Ali LeRoi	Lauren Houseman & Allen Maldonado	September 17, 2017	0.413
32	6	"Reparations"	Salli Richardson-Whitfield	Victor Levin	September 24, 2017	0.378
33	7	"Optics"	Victor Levin	Victor Levin	October 1, 2017	0.390
34	8	"Future Plans"	Iain B. MacDonald	Benjamin Neivert & Brendan O'Malley	October 8, 2017	0.279
35	9	"Family Ties"	Ali LeRoi	Ali LeRoi	October 15, 2017	0.216
36	10	"Answers and Questions"	Victor Levin	Victor Levin	October 15, 2017	0.226

== Critical reception and accolades ==
The Village Voice listed Survivor's Remorse as one of the best shows of 2015, saying "If it were on HBO or FX, this glossy but ambitious comedy about an African-American family that moves from Boston's down-and-out Dorchester neighborhood into the Atlanta sports elite would be the only thing anybody would ever talk about. Instead, Mike O'Malley's saga of a family whose dynamics get compellingly distorted when one of their own makes it big in the NBA — and the show's sharp and raunchy discussions of race, class, and sexuality — remains, in its second year, an unfairly buried gem." By the conclusion of its final season, Survivor's Remorse averaged an 82 on Metacritic, indicating "universal acclaim". Daniel Fienberg of The Hollywood Reporter called it "one of TV's sharpest and most provocative comedies," while Alan Sepinwall praised it as "intensely satisfying and like nothing else on TV." Writing about the show for Paste, in response to its "Photoshoot" episode focusing on colorism, Shannon M. Houston referred to the show as a "powerful beam, highlighting all that TV has yet to touch on, even during this Golden Age of peak TV."

Survivor's Remorse was a GLAAD nominee for Outstanding Comedy Series in 2017 and 2018. The series and its cast were also nominated for and won several NAACP Image Awards: Tichina Arnold for Outstanding Supporting Actress in a Comedy Series in 2016, 2017, and 2018 (winning in 2017); Mike Epps for Outstanding Supporting Actor in a Comedy Series in 2016 (winner), RonReaco Lee for Outstanding Actor in a Comedy Series in 2016 and 2018 (nominated), Erica Ash for Outstanding Supporting Actress in a Comedy Series in 2017 (nominated), and the series itself nominated for Outstanding Comedy Series 2016–2018. The African-American Film Critics Association awarded Survivor's Remorse "Best Cable/New Media TV Show" in 2015 and named it the 10th best show of 2016.
