= Make a Film Foundation =

American charity

- Formation: 2006
- Founder: Tamika Lamison
- Type: Film and television industry organization
- Website: makeafilmfoundation.org

Make a Film Foundation (Note: The organization often spells its name "Make A Film Foundation" with a capital A, though its logo is all-capitals. Independent publishers such as newspapers follow their own style guides, either rendering it a, as is more usual in such a name, or using A to follow the marketing materials of the organization.) is a 501(c)(3) non-profit organization founded in 2006 by writer, director, producer, and actor Tamika Lamison. Make a Film Foundation helps children and teenagers who have serious medical conditions to create short films by teaming them with noted actors, writers and directors. Between its Short Narrative Program and Vidz 4 Kidz Short Documentary Program, Make a Film Foundation has created over 100 short films. These films have screened at various film festivals and won awards.

== History ==
Make a Film Foundation grants film wishes to children all over the United States, and was started in the fall of 2005, after the founder, Tamika Lamison received a six-figure payment for her script "The Jar by the Door". This windfall let the founder to pursue her lifelong passions for teaching, mentoring, and film making.

== Funding and financial stewardship ==
Ninety percent of Make a Film Foundation's budget is supplied by donations that go directly to programming. Revenue breakdown between 2006 and 2013 were as follows: 75% contributions, 20% special events, and 5% "other", according to IRS 990 annual reports.

== Programs ==
=== Short Narrative Program ===
A child or teenager who suffers from a serious or life-threatening medical condition has the opportunity, with the help of industry mentors, to write and star in their own short film. They star in the film with professional actors, under a professional director.

These films generally play in festivals and some have won awards. The budget per film to range anywhere from US$50,000 to $100,000. All cast and crew participate on a volunteer basis, with shooting taking place over the course of a weekend. The film is then edited, and screened at an event in Hollywood as well as premiering in a theatre in the hometown of the authoring child or teenager.

The short films include:

==== "The Magic Bracelet" ====
Written by Rina Goldberg, whose dream was to see her script turned into a short film, and who died due to mitochondrial disease in December 2010. Her final words to her mother were, "Promise you'll take care of my film." Her script was then adapted into a short film by Academy Award-winning writer Diablo Cody (Juno). Jon Poll (director of Charlie Bartlett and co-producer of Meet the Fockers) directed. The film stars Bailee Madison (Parental Guidance, Just Go with It); Hailee Steinfeld (Academy Award-nominated in the 2010 remake of True Grit); Jackson Rathbone (Twilight film franchise); JK Simmons (Juno, Sam Raimi's Spider-Man films); James Van Der Beek (Don't Trust the B— in Apartment 23, Dawson's Creek). The film's red-carpet premieres were in Los Angeles in May 2013 and Philadelphia in June 2013. It has been requested by US festivals.

==== "Deep Blue Breath" ====
Written by Clay Beabout, an 11-year-old boy with what then called VATER syndrome (today VACTERL association) who has survived over 40 surgeries. Beabout starred in the film with Sean Astin (Lord of the Rings), Miguel Sandoval (Medium), Natasha Gregson Wagner (High Fidelity) and Ernie Hudson (Ghostbusters). It was directed by Patricia Cardoso (Real Women Have Curves). The film is half animation and half live-action, and is about a boy who travels deep inside his body to an animated dream world where he engages in battle against the evil Lord Vater – a monstrous manifestation of his disease, and a play on Darth Vader. Meanwhile, in the waking world, a medical team tries to save his life. Deep Blue Breath has played in more than 40 film festivals and has won awards.

==== "Put It in a Book" ====
The first narrative short film created by Make a Film Foundation, it was written in 2007 by and starred Jabril Muhammad, who had Sickle Cell Anemia. The film featured Kerry Washington (Django Unchained) and Michael Ealy (Think Like a Man). It was directed by Rodrigo García (Albert Nobbs). In this story, two brothers try to survive the mean streets of Los Angeles; when one is killed by gang violence, the other has to choose between a path of righteousness or one of revenge. Put It in a Book has played at over 20 film festivals, also winning numerous awards. Before "Put It in a Book", Muhammad, also a street poet, had previously been the subject of a short documentary, "Peace Process" (2006, by Katina Parker and Dahéli Hall). Muhammad went on to theatre studies at Santa Monica College in 2008 and Humboldt State University in 2011, but died in 2016.

=== Vidz 4 Kidz Short Documentary Program ===
This program teams children who have serious or life-threatening medical conditions with hand-held video cameras and film mentors who help them to create/shoot short mini-movies in 2 to 3 hours. The shorts are a hybrid of documentary and narrative consisting of interviews from the children, doctors, parents, etc. The films are edited and screened at a red-carpet event for the children. Directors who have participated in this program include: Marc Forster (World War Z, Finding Neverland), Bennett Miller (Money Ball), and Rodrigo Garcia (Albert Nobbs).

== See also ==
- Make-A-Wish Foundation
