= How I Spent My Summer Vacation (1997 film) =

- Directed by: John Fisher
- Written by: John Fisher
- Produced by: Alan James Gay; Christopher Mills
- Starring: Deanna Davis; RonReaco Lee; E. Roger Mitchell; Jade Jenise Dixon; Sahr Ngaujah
- Cinematography: Charles Mills
- Edited by: Alan James Gay; Norman Todd
- Music by: Johnny Barrow
- Distributed by: The Cinema Guild; Xenon Pictures
- Release date: 1997
- Running time: 73 min.
- Country: United States
- Language: English

How I Spent My Summer Vacation is a 1997 romantic comedy film directed by John Fisher. The film stars Deanna Davis and RonReaco Lee, and is Fisher's directorial debut film.

== Plot ==
Perry (Lee) and Stephanie's (Davis) junior year in college has just ended. Though the two have been dating since high school, they both feel that the spark in the relationship is gone, and that their constant bickering, breaking up, and making up has become more like a game. They both decide the best thing to do is to call off the relationship before their senior year, so they can test the waters with other people. Perry begins to date Tammy, a young woman who actually has a boyfriend overseas. While he's very attracted to Tammy (Dixon), he can't really shake his yearning for Stephanie. Eventually Perry tries to reconcile their relationship, and finds that Stephanie might be testing waters of her own.

== Cast ==
- Deanna Dawn Davis — Stephanie
- RonReaco Lee — Perry
- Darren Law — Nolan
- E. Roger Mitchell — Joseph
- Felice Heather Monteith — Helen
- Jade Jenise Dixon — Tammy
- Maisha Dyson — Rhonda
- Maude Bond — Monica
- Sahr Ngaujah — D'Angelo
- T'Erika Jenks — Kim
