= Reel Sisters of the Diaspora =

Film festival devoted to supporting films produced, directed and written by women of color

- Location: Brooklyn, New York
- Established: 1997
- Website: http://reelsisters.com

The Reel Sisters of the Diaspora Film Festival & Lecture Series is an annual film festival founded by African Voices magazine and Long Island University's Media Arts Department, Brooklyn Campus. Established in 1997, Reel Sisters is dedicated to providing opportunities for women of color filmmakers to advance their careers in the film industry. In 2018, the Reel Sisters of the Diaspora Film Festival became the first Academy Award Qualifying Film Festival for narrative shorts dedicated to women of color.

== History ==
Reel Sisters of the Diaspora Film Festival and Lecture Series was founded in 1997 by African Voices magazine publisher Carolyn A. Butts and Long Island University, Brooklyn Campus. It is the first Brooklyn-based festival devoted to supporting films produced, directed and written by women of color. Butts came up with the idea in 1996, when she experienced push-back when shopping a short film she produced, in the hope of turning it into a feature-length documentary on the Brooklyn poetry movement. "It was so hard to get support for me as an African American woman,” she reflected. “I united with a small group of women, and I came up with the idea to do a conference or a festival that was solely devoted to women of color -- not just African American, but Caribbean, Latina, and Asian. I created an outlet where we could network; we could build a resource for each other to get our films made. It's not always money [or] having money. It's also having that support system -- that tribe that you can go to to get your films produced."

The festival screens over 50 films each year, and since its inception, has screened over 5,200 films by women of African, Caribbean, Latino, Asian, Indian and Native American descent. Reel Sisters attracts about 2,271 attendees, who arrive from across the United States and from abroad. The festival has grown from a two-day event to a month-long celebration that includes lectures and workshops on a variety of subjects, and also curates events throughout the year.

Reel Sisters is a competitive festival and films are selected by an independent jury. Films by gender non-conforming filmmakers are accepted, as long as they are women-centered. In 2013, Reel Sisters presented Shola Lynch (Free Angela & All Political Prisoners) with its Trailblazer Award and Issa Rae (Awkward Black Girl) with the first Reel Sisters Innovation Pioneer Award for groundbreaking working in producing her award-winning web series. Reel Sisters also provides scholarships to emerging women filmmakers and offers other resources for women filmmakers.

The festival sometimes chooses a theme, such as the 21st edition in 2018, which was dedicated to self-care, wellness, and healing.

Reel Sisters is sponsored by National Endowment for the Arts, New York State Council on the Arts and the Brooklyn Council on the Arts.

In 2021, Spelman College acquired the archives of African Voices Communications, Inc., the nonprofit organization that runs Reel Sisters. The festival's rich history will be digitized by the college and available for future generations to access.

== Awards ==
The festival accepts and screens film in any genre and from any media, including animation and web series. Awards are provided in the following categories:

Jury awards

- Best Director
- Best Documentary
- Best Screenplay
- Best Experimental
- Best Animation
- Best Feature
- Best Narrative Short
- Best Web Series
- Reel Sisters Spirit Award

Reel Sisters special awards

- Hattie McDaniel Award - honors women who are pioneers in the fields of theater, film and media
- Trailblazer Award - recognizes honorees in the film and television industry for their outstanding accomplishments and professional integrity in opening doors for other women of color

== See also ==
- List of women's film festivals
