= Daredevil (TV series) =

2015–2018 Marvel Television series

- Genre: Action-adventure; Crime drama; Legal drama; Superhero
- Created by: Drew Goddard
- Based on: Daredevil by: Stan Lee; Bill Everett
- Showrunners: Steven S. DeKnight; Douglas Petrie; Marco Ramirez; Erik Oleson
- Starring: Charlie Cox; Deborah Ann Woll; Elden Henson; Toby Leonard Moore; Vondie Curtis-Hall; Bob Gunton; Ayelet Zurer; Rosario Dawson; Vincent D'Onofrio; Jon Bernthal; Élodie Yung; Stephen Rider; Joanne Whalley; Jay Ali; Wilson Bethel
- Theme music composer: John Paesano; Braden Kimball
- Composer: John Paesano
- Country of origin: United States
- Original language: English
- No. of seasons: 3
- No. of episodes: 39

Production
- Executive producers: Peter Friedlander; Allie Goss; Kris Henigman; Cindy Holland; Alan Fine; Stan Lee; Joe Quesada; Dan Buckley; Jim Chory; Jeph Loeb; Drew Goddard; Steven S. DeKnight; Mark Verheiden; Alison Engel; Marco Ramirez; Douglas Petrie; Karim Zreik; Erik Oleson
- Producers: Kati Johnston; Evan Perazzo
- Production location: New York City
- Cinematography: Matthew J. Lloyd; Martin Ahlgren; Petr Hlinomaz; Christopher LaVasseur
- Editors: Jonathan Chibnall; Michael N. Knue; Monty DeGraff; Jo Francis; Damien Smith; Jesse Ellis; Trey Ordoñez
- Running time: 46–61 minutes
- Production companies: Marvel Television; ABC Studios; Goddard Textiles; DeKnight Productions

Original release
- Network: Netflix
- Release: April 10, 2015 – October 19, 2018

Related
- Marvel's Netflix television series; The Punisher; Daredevil: Born Again

Marvel's Daredevil is an American television series created by Drew Goddard for the streaming service Netflix, based on the Marvel Comics character Daredevil. It is set in the Marvel Cinematic Universe (MCU), sharing continuity with the films of the franchise, and was the first Marvel Netflix series leading to the crossover miniseries The Defenders (2017). Daredevil was produced by Marvel Television in association with ABC Studios. Steven S. DeKnight served as showrunner for the first season, with Doug Petrie and Marco Ramirez taking over as co-showrunners for the second, and Erik Oleson joining the series as showrunner for the third; Goddard served as a consultant for the series.

Charlie Cox stars as Matt Murdock / Daredevil, a blind lawyer-by-day who fights crime as a masked vigilante by night. Deborah Ann Woll, Elden Henson, Rosario Dawson, and Vincent D'Onofrio also star, with Toby Leonard Moore, Vondie Curtis-Hall, Bob Gunton, and Ayelet Zurer joining them for season one, Jon Bernthal, Élodie Yung, and Stephen Rider joining the cast for season two, and Joanne Whalley, Jay Ali and Wilson Bethel joining in season three. Daredevil entered development in late 2013, a year after the film rights to the character reverted to Marvel, with Goddard initially hired in December 2013. Cox was cast in May 2014, and the Daredevil costume was designed by Ryan Meinerding of Marvel Studios' design team. The series was intended to be darker than other Marvel projects, intentionally avoiding crossovers with the wider MCU and focusing on a crime fiction style that was inspired by 1970s films. Design inspiration was taken from the Hell's Kitchen setting of the comics, with filming taking place in New York City.

The first season was released in its entirety on Netflix on April 10, 2015, followed by the second on March 18, 2016, and the third on October 19, 2018. They were met with positive reviews, and received numerous accolades including several nominations for Primetime Creative Arts Emmy Awards. A spin-off series centered on Bernthal's character Frank Castle / Punisher, titled The Punisher, was ordered by Netflix in April 2016. Netflix canceled Daredevil on November 29, 2018. It, along with the rest of Netflix's Marvel series, was moved from Netflix to Disney+ in March 2022 after Disney regained the license. Beginning in 2021, Cox and D'Onofrio reprised their roles as Murdock and Wilson Fisk / Kingpin in MCU projects produced by Marvel Studios, including a revival series for Disney+ titled Daredevil: Born Again (2025–present) in which Woll, Henson, Zurer, Bernthal, Bethel, Moore, and Yung also reprise their roles.

== Premise ==
The first season sees lawyer-by-day Matt Murdock use his heightened senses from being blinded as a young boy to fight crime at night on the streets of New York City's Hell's Kitchen neighborhood as Daredevil while uncovering a conspiracy of the criminal underworld led by Wilson Fisk. In the second season, Murdock continues to balance life as a lawyer and Daredevil, while crossing paths with Frank Castle / Punisher, a vigilante with far deadlier methods, as well as the return of an ex-girlfriend—Elektra Natchios. In the third season, after Fisk is released from prison, Murdock, who has been missing for months following the events of The Defenders, reemerges as a broken man and must decide between hiding from the world as a criminal lawyer or embracing his life as a hero vigilante.

== Cast and characters ==
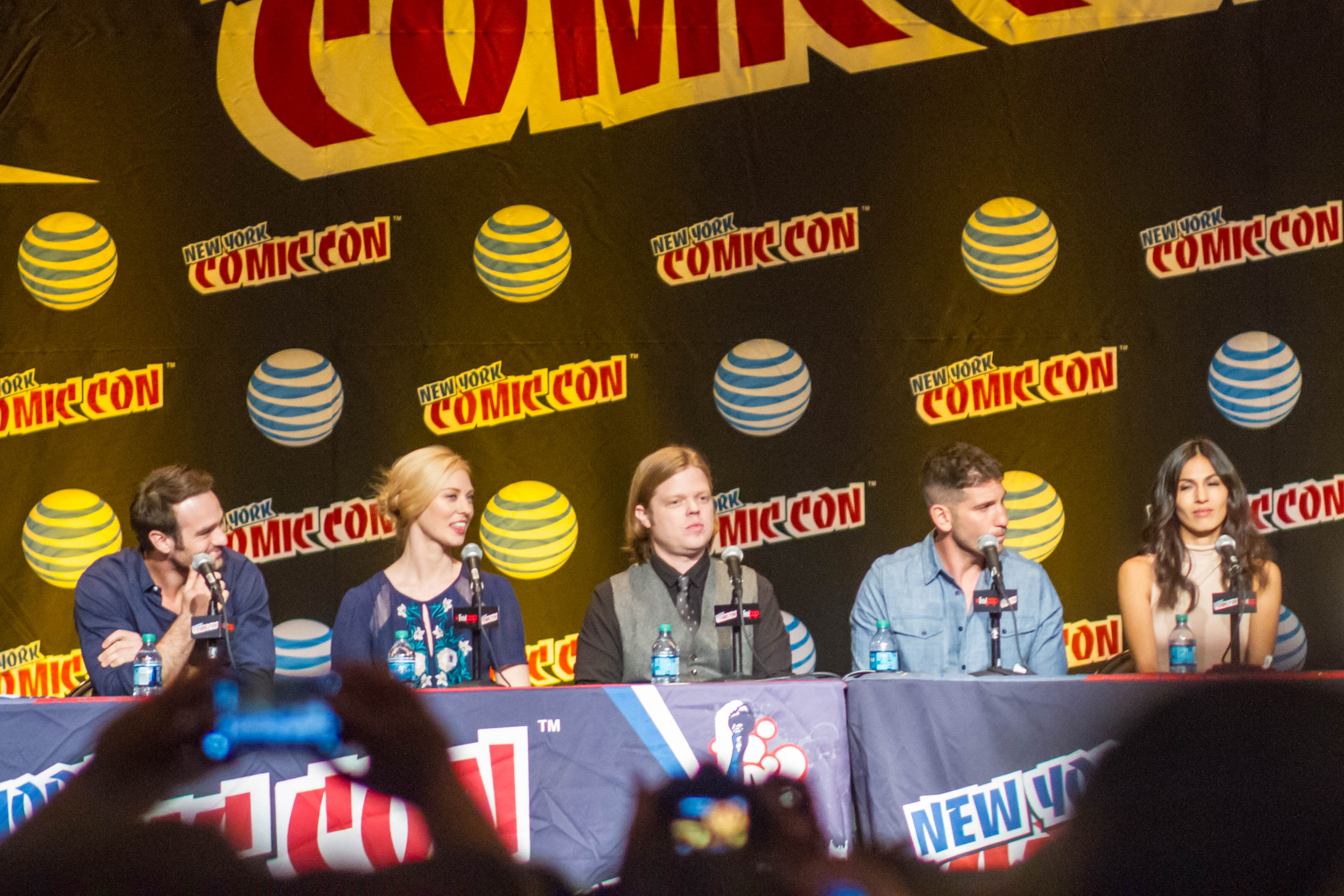
Cast of Daredevil at the 2015 New York Comic Con (L to R: Cox, Woll, Henson, Bernthal, Yung)

- Charlie Cox as Matt Murdock / Daredevil:
  A blind lawyer with superhuman senses who leads a double life as a masked vigilante. Season one showrunner Steven DeKnight explained that Murdock is "not super strong. He's not invulnerable [...] he just has senses that are better than a normal human's." On the character's "grey" morals, he noted, "He's a lawyer by day, and he's taken this oath. But every night he breaks that oath, and goes out and does very violent things." The character's Catholicism plays a large role in the series, with DeKnight calling him "one of the most, if not the most, religious characters in the Marvel Universe". Cox worked with blind consultant Joe Strechay, and was conscious of what his eyes were doing at all times, to ensure they would not look at or react to something unlike a blind person. Skylar Gaertner plays a young Matt Murdock.
- Deborah Ann Woll as Karen Page:
  An enigmatic young woman whose quest for justice sends her crashing into Murdock's life. After portraying Jessica Hamby in True Blood from 2008 to 2014, Woll specifically tried to "steer differently than that" with Page. Woll noted that Page's backstory would be different from the one from the comics, saying, "In the comic books, in the beginning Karen is very innocent, and then towards the end she's really swung a full 180, she's in a lot of trouble, so I wanted to find a way to make her both of those things at the same time. Can she be a really wonderful, kind person who is a little bit attracted to danger? She's not just always getting into trouble because 'Oh, silly woman!' Karen is actually looking for it, and she won't let her fear stop her from finding the truth."
- Elden Henson as Franklin "Foggy" Nelson:
  Murdock's best friend and law partner. In April 2015, Henson spoke of his excitement for the character's role in the series, saying "I was really excited as I was getting the scripts and reading that Foggy wasn't just a useless sidekick. He's not just comic relief. I mean, he is some of those things. He does have comic relief, but it was exciting to know that these other characters would have their own path and their own things that they're dealing with."
- Toby Leonard Moore as James Wesley: Wilson Fisk's right-hand man. Moore described Wesley as both charming and "dastardly as all hell".
- Vondie Curtis-Hall as Ben Urich: An investigative journalist for the New York Bulletin.
- Bob Gunton as Leland Owlsley: A Wall Street financialist, accountant, and a key figure in Wilson Fisk's plans for Hell's Kitchen.
- Ayelet Zurer as Vanessa Marianna-Fisk: An art gallery employee who, unlike the comic version, knows of and accepts Wilson Fisk's true dealings and eventually marries him.
- Rosario Dawson as Claire Temple:
  A nurse who helps Murdock. The character is an amalgam of the comic characters Claire Temple and Night Nurse. The character was originally going to be "the actual Night Nurse", but was merged with Temple when the writers learned that Marvel Studios had plans for that character in their films. Dawson explained that Temple "is a normal person and she becomes more heroic in a way that she maybe didn't expect", and "She's not a love interest—she's this skeptical eye looking at this strange situation. She's the one who can be like, 'You're not really good at this.' That makes it feel more real."
- Vincent D'Onofrio as Wilson Fisk / Kingpin:
  A powerful businessman and crime lord whose interests in the future of Hell's Kitchen brings him into conflict with Murdock and Daredevil. D'Onofrio stated that he hoped his portrayal of Fisk was a new way to look at the character, and that it would be the definitive portrayal of Fisk. DeKnight detailed that "Fisk has very many different aspects so it's not all, 'I want to conquer the city and make a lot of money.' In our story, we tell the story of how he met his wife Vanessa and how they fell in love." He also said that "if you're looking for a juicy, multi-faceted crime drama, Wilson Fisk was the obvious choice to play the antagonist [...] [he] really felt like the right yin to the yang for Matt, and for what we wanted to do this season." Cole Jensen plays a young Wilson Fisk.
- Jon Bernthal as Frank Castle / Punisher:
  A vigilante who aims to clean up Hell's Kitchen by any means necessary, no matter how lethal the results. DeKnight said this version of Punisher would be "completely the Marvel version", as previous portrayals did not appear under the Marvel Studios / Marvel Television banner. He also felt Bernthal's Punisher would not be as "graphically violent" as in Punisher: War Zone (2008). Season two showrunner Doug Petrie stated that Travis Bickle from Taxi Driver (1976) was an influence on the character, as well as current events, saying, "Taking lethal justice into your own hands in America in 2015 is tricky shit. We have not shied away from the rich complicated reality of Now. If you've got a gun and you're not the police you're going to incite strong feelings." Bernthal added that "This character has resonated with law enforcement and military [...] and the best thing about him is that if he offends you, he just doesn't care."
- Élodie Yung as Elektra Natchios:
  A mysterious and dangerous woman from Murdock's past. The character was referred to in the first season, before Yung was cast in the role. Describing Elektra's effect on Murdock, Petrie called her "the best bad girlfriend you can possibly have. She does everything wrong and attractive, she's [Matt's] id, the wild side. Matt is always taming his wild side. Elektra just lets it out. He's both repulsed and deeply drawn to that." Yung described Elektra as "kind of a sociopath. This world is a game for her. It's like a chess game, and what motivates her is what she wants. She'll use anything she needs to use to get to her goal, and if she needs to kill people, she would." She added that Elektra is neither good nor bad, but a "person with different traits" and layers. Lily Chee plays a young Elektra.
- Stephen Rider as Blake Tower: A New York district attorney who assists Daredevil with information to help track down and capture criminals
- Joanne Whalley as Maggie Grace: A nun with strong opinions who speaks her mind, and cares for Murdock as he recovers from his injuries. She is later revealed to be Murdock's mother.
- Jay Ali as Rahul "Ray" Nadeem: An honest and ambitious FBI agent who takes on Fisk's case.
- Wilson Bethel as Benjamin "Dex" Poindexter:
  A psychopathic FBI agent who is a highly skilled marksman capable of using almost any object as a lethal projectile. Bethel described his character as "a really nuanced portrait of a man with some very serious psychological issues", and said that to prepare for the role, he had to read up on experiences of psychoses and schizophrenia. Furthermore, he said Dex needed the "structure of the bureau to keep the darkness inside him subdued". Executive producer Jeph Loeb said the character's interaction with Wilson Fisk would corrupt Poindexter and turn him into a Daredevil adversary.

== Episodes ==
Season	Episodes	Originally released
1	13	April 10, 2015
2	13	March 18, 2016
3	13	October 19, 2018

=== Season 1 (2015) ===
No. overall	No. in season	Title	Directed by	Written by	Original release date
1	1	"Into the Ring"	Phil Abraham	Drew Goddard	April 10, 2015
2	2	"Cut Man"	Phil Abraham	Drew Goddard	April 10, 2015
3	3	"Rabbit in a Snowstorm"	Adam Kane	Marco Ramirez	April 10, 2015
4	4	"In the Blood"	Ken Girotti	Joe Pokaski	April 10, 2015
5	5	"World on Fire"	Farren Blackburn	Luke Kalteux	April 10, 2015
6	6	"Condemned"	Guy Ferland	Joe Pokaski & Marco Ramirez	April 10, 2015
7	7	"Stick"	Brad Turner	Douglas Petrie	April 10, 2015
8	8	"Shadows in the Glass"	Stephen Surjik	Steven S. DeKnight	April 10, 2015
9	9	"Speak of the Devil"	Nelson McCormick	Christos Gage & Ruth Fletcher Gage	April 10, 2015
10	10	"Nelson v. Murdock"	Farren Blackburn	Luke Kalteux	April 10, 2015
11	11	"The Path of the Righteous"	Nick Gomez	Steven S. DeKnight & Douglas Petrie	April 10, 2015
12	12	"The Ones We Leave Behind"	Euros Lyn	Douglas Petrie	April 10, 2015
13	13	"Daredevil"	Steven S. DeKnight	Steven S. DeKnight	April 10, 2015

=== Season 2 (2016) ===
No. overall	No. in season	Title	Directed by	Written by	Original release date
14	1	"Bang"	Phil Abraham	Douglas Petrie & Marco Ramirez	March 18, 2016
15	2	"Dogs to a Gunfight"	Phil Abraham	Marco Ramirez & Douglas Petrie	March 18, 2016
16	3	"New York's Finest"	Marc Jobst	Mark Verheiden	March 18, 2016
17	4	"Penny and Dime"	Peter Hoar	John C. Kelley	March 18, 2016
18	5	"Kinbaku"	Floria Sigismondi	Lauren Schmidt Hissrich	March 18, 2016
19	6	"Regrets Only"	Andy Goddard	Sneha Koorse	March 18, 2016
20	7	"Semper Fidelis"	Ken Girotti	Luke Kalteux	March 18, 2016
21	8	"Guilty as Sin"	Michael Uppendahl	Whit Anderson	March 18, 2016
22	9	"Seven Minutes in Heaven"	Stephen Surjik	Marco Ramirez & Lauren Schmidt Hissrich	March 18, 2016
23	10	"The Man in the Box"	Peter Hoar	Story by : John C. Kelley; Teleplay by : Whit Anderson & Sneha Koorse	March 18, 2016
24	11	".380"	Stephen Surjik	Mark Verheiden	March 18, 2016
25	12	"The Dark at the End of the Tunnel"	Euros Lyn	Lauren Schmidt Hissrich & Douglas Petrie	March 18, 2016
26	13	"A Cold Day in Hell's Kitchen"	Peter Hoar	Douglas Petrie & Marco Ramirez	March 18, 2016

=== Season 3 (2018) ===
No. overall	No. in season	Title	Directed by	Written by	Original release date
27	1	"Resurrection"	Marc Jobst	Erik Oleson	October 19, 2018
28	2	"Please"	Lukas Ettlin	Jim Dunn	October 19, 2018
29	3	"No Good Deed"	Jennifer Getzinger	Sonay Hoffman	October 19, 2018
30	4	"Blindsided"	Alex García López	Lewaa Nasserdeen	October 19, 2018
31	5	"The Perfect Game"	Julian Holmes	Tonya Kong	October 19, 2018
32	6	"The Devil You Know"	Stephen Surjik	Dylan Gallagher	October 19, 2018
33	7	"Aftermath"	Toa Fraser	Sarah Streicher	October 19, 2018
34	8	"Upstairs/Downstairs"	Alex Zakrzewski	Dara Resnik	October 19, 2018
35	9	"Revelations"	Jennifer Lynch	Erik Oleson & Sam Ernst	October 19, 2018
36	10	"Karen"	Alex García López	Tamara Becher-Wilkinson	October 19, 2018
37	11	"Reunion"	Jet Wilkinson	Jim Dunn & Dara Resnik	October 19, 2018
38	12	"One Last Shot"	Phil Abraham	Sam Ernst	October 19, 2018
39	13	"A New Napkin"	Sam Miller	Erik Oleson	October 19, 2018

== Production ==
=== Development ===
In April 2013, Marvel Studios president Kevin Feige confirmed that the film rights to Daredevil and his associated characters reverted to Marvel from 20th Century Fox in October 2012, allowing those characters to be used within the Marvel Cinematic Universe (MCU). As explained by head of Marvel Television Jeph Loeb in 2015, Marvel Studios had "first dibs" on the character once the rights had reverted. Drew Goddard pitched a new Daredevil film to Marvel, but Marvel was not looking to create an R-rated film, and Goddard did not want a "watered down version" of the character, as he also explained in 2015: "I went into Marvel and talked to them about making it as a movie a couple of years ago, long after the [Ben] Affleck movie. But what we all sort of realized is that, this movie doesn't want to cost $200 million. The thing about Matt Murdock is, he's not saving the world. He's just keeping his corner clean. So it would feel wrong to have spaceships crashing in the middle of the city. But because of that, Marvel on the movie side is not in the business of making $25 million movies. They're going big, as they should". Marvel Studios eventually decided that the character would be better served in a television series. Although Feige had plans to use Daredevil in the films, the superiors of Marvel Entertainment ordered Marvel Studios to focus the films on the Avengers and the Guardians of the Galaxy so the characters whose rights they had regained could help build a planned "television empire" under their direct control.

In October 2013, Deadline Hollywood reported that Marvel was preparing four drama series and a miniseries, totaling 60 episodes, to present to video on demand services and cable providers, with Netflix, Amazon and WGN America expressing interest. A few weeks later, Disney announced that Marvel Television and ABC Studios would provide Netflix with live action series centered around Daredevil, Jessica Jones, Iron Fist, and Luke Cage, leading up to a miniseries based on the Defenders. This format was chosen due to the success of The Avengers (2012), for which the characters of Iron Man, The Hulk, Captain America, and Thor were all introduced separately before being teamed up in that film. In December, Goddard was officially hired as executive producer and showrunner for Daredevil, and his production company Goddard Textiles produced the first season. Goddard was happy with the change to television from his film idea "because you can take time and deal with these smaller things, which to me are much more interesting on a character level". However, Marvel announced in May 2014 that Goddard had stepped down as showrunner to focus on directing a feature film based on Marvel's Sinister Six team for Sony Pictures Entertainment. Goddard, who wrote the first two episodes of the series, remained with the show as a consultant while Steven S. DeKnight took over as showrunner, with his production company DeKnight Productions producing the first season. The series was officially titled Daredevil, with Peter Friedlander, Allie Goss, Kris Henigman, Cindy Holland, Alan Fine, Stan Lee, Joe Quesada, Dan Buckley, Jim Chory, Loeb, Goddard, and DeKnight also serving as executive producers. Kati Johnston served as a producer.

In April 2015, Marvel and Netflix announced that Daredevil had been renewed for a second season, but DeKnight would not be returning due to prior commitments. He was replaced as showrunner by Doug Petrie and Marco Ramirez, who served as writers for the first season and worked closely with DeKnight and Goddard. Mark Verheiden, Alison Engel, Ramirez, and Petrie became executive producers for the second season, while Friedlander left the show. The series was renewed for a third season in July 2016, with Petrie and Ramirez intended to return as showrunners, but Erik Oleson was announced in October 2017 to be taking over as showrunner, and Karim Zreik, and Oleson also serving as executive producers. Evan Perazzo served as a producer for the season.

=== Writing ===
Elements of the series storyline were adapted from Frank Miller and John Romita Jr.'s 1993–1994 miniseries Daredevil: The Man Without Fear, a retelling of the character's origin story. Goddard had been a longtime fan of Daredevil after being raised Catholic, and identifying with the character's story of a "Catholic superhero struggling with the notions of right and wrong". He did not want to be "a guy that just takes the comics and then shoots them onscreen. I think it's our job to treat it as if it's our run. If I'm the writer of a comic book, you wouldn't just retell someone else's story, you would just take that ball and move it forward."

In August 2014, when talking about the series in comparison to the 2003 film, Ted Sarandos said, "The series will not be afraid to go darker than the film did. What we love about this particular set of heroes is that they're a little more down to Earth. Costume wise and also in that these are gritty crime stories, more in the streets than in the clouds." Elaborating on this, DeKnight said, "It is a little grittier and edgier than Marvel has gone before, but we're not looking to push it to extreme graphic violence, gratuitous nudity or anything like that. The story does not require that and I think [it] would suffer if you pushed it that far." Marvel Television head and executive producer Loeb later stated that, "There aren't going to be people flying through the sky; there are no magic hammers. We've always approached this as a crime drama first, superhero show second." DeKnight took inspiration from The French Connection (1971), Dog Day Afternoon (1975), and Taxi Driver (1976), and stated that "we would rather lean toward The Wire (2002–2008) than what's considered a classic superhero television show."

Loeb compared the series' approach to telling stories over multiple seasons to "the world of publishing, where you have the Frank Miller, you have the Brian Bendis run, you have the Ed Brubaker run. I was lucky enough to do Daredevil: Yellow (2001–2002). But they feel different. They have different elements to them. Same cast. In many cases, same tone. But a different adventure [...] you can watch Daredevil season two without having seen Daredevil season one. But if you watch each of them, it's like getting two different books. It's closer to the world of the graphic novel than it is to the world of the ongoing, serialized show."

=== Casting ===
At the end of May 2014, Charlie Cox was cast as Matt Murdock / Daredevil. Though Quesada suggested in 2012 before Marvel Studios regained the rights to the character from the former 20th Century Fox that Cox was the right choice for the part, when Cox initially auditioned, the producers felt he was a better fit to play Foggy Nelson. On June 10, Marvel announced that Vincent D'Onofrio would portray Wilson Fisk / Kingpin in the series, and on June 20, Rosario Dawson joined the cast. A few days later, Elden Henson was cast as Foggy Nelson, while on July 17, Deborah Ann Woll was cast as Karen Page. On October 11, Dawson's role was revealed to be Claire Temple, a character resembling that of Night Nurse, while Ayelet Zurer, Bob Gunton, Toby Leonard Moore, and Vondie Curtis-Hall joined the series as Vanessa Mariana, Leland Owlsley, James Wesley, and Ben Urich, respectively.

In June 2015, Marvel announced that Jon Bernthal was cast as Frank Castle / Punisher for the second season, joining season one returners Cox, Woll, Henson, Dawson, and D'Onofrio. The next month, Élodie Yung was cast as Elektra Natchios, a character that had been mentioned already in the first season. In September 2015, Stephen Rider joined the cast in the role of Blake Tower. Cox, Woll, Henson, D'Onofrio, and Rider return for the third season. Wilson Bethel was revealed to be joining them in November 2017, as Benjamin "Dex" Poindexter, with Joanne Whalley joining as Sister Maggie Grace by January 2018, and Jay Ali joining as FBI agent Rahul "Ray" Nadeem by March 2018. Zurer has a guest appearance in the season.

On the casting process, DeKnight stated that "You just have to hope you find the right way. Luckily our cast came together, and I couldn't have been happier. No one will ever perfectly fit what's in your head. For me, the more important thing is not whether or not they look the part, but if they feel the part." Laray Mayfield and Julie Schubert served as casting directors on the series. In December 2017, D'Onofrio revealed he had "a standing agreement with Jeph Loeb", created before the first season, that allowed him to "come in and out of the show", with an unspecified amount of notice given when Marvel hoped to use D'Onofrio in the series.

=== Design ===
==== Costumes ====
Costume designer Stephanie Maslansky, talking about the inspiration and vision for the series, said "Daredevil is rooted in the authentically gritty New York City neighborhood, Hell's Kitchen where Matt Murdock grew up. In the comics—particularly those of the Frank Miller era in the early 1990s—there were detailed illustrations we endeavored to bring to life in a grounded, gritty, and updated way, with respect and a strong nod to the original characters. We wanted to pick up where the comics version left off. I studied the illustrations from The Man Without Fear, Daredevil Yellow, and the issues of the 1960s, to which the newer collections pay homage. I wanted the costume design to reflect the illustrations of those volumes through a modern lens while maintaining a retro sensibility." Joshua Shaw, who has also done design work on Agents of S.H.I.E.L.D. (2013–2020), helped design costumes for several characters on Daredevil, while Lorraine Calvert took over as costume designer for the second season.

For Daredevil's red suit, introduced at the end of the first season, Marvel Comics' Chief creative officer Quesada contacted Ryan Meinerding and the costume artists and design team at Marvel Studios, who all contributed design ideas, with one of Meinerding's ultimately being picked. Quesada, who previously worked as an artist on Daredevil comics, gave several suggestions, including the incorporation of some of how New York was created into the suit, which led to the use of rivets and "architectural" shapes. The suit is intended to look like a Kevlar vest, and the black sections are an homage to comic panels where the artists highlighted certain areas with red, with "deeper portions" in shadow. On the mask, Meinerding noted the difficulty in designing the entire top half of a face that is intended to match the bottom half of an actor's face, "because half of his face has to be covered and has its own expression and the actor's face is going to be doing something else". For the billy clubs used by Daredevil in the series, which were designed by Andy Park, "There was a discussion early in the process, because Charlie Cox [and his stunt double] Chris Brewster are both right handed, of having the billy clubs holster on the right leg. But Daredevil wears those billy clubs on the left hand side. So while it would have been easier to place the holster on the right we all felt that we had to keep to the classic profile and keep them on the left."

The suit was upgraded for the second season, with Calvert calling it "a much more fluid suit and much more tactical in a way." The costume department "streamlined" the suit to make it simpler, using less material on the gauntlets and boots. Cox described the changes as "tweaks" that were needed after seeing the suit in action in the first season, and noted that the changes are woven into the storyline of the season, including the need for a new, redesigned mask.

==== Title sequence ====
External videos
- The opening title sequence of Daredevil, showcasing Elastic's design work and composer John Paesano's main theme for the series.

The opening title sequence was created by Elastic. The company previously created the title sequence for True Detective (2014–present), which had stood out to the creators in terms of "imagination and delivering on what the show was about". DeKnight explained that multiple companies had made pitches to the creative team involving "variations of the same idea, where you zoom in on an eye and you see a sonar map of the city." However, one of Elastic's pitches had "fluid-like blood dripping over everything [...] as if paint were covering something invisible and revealing it", which both DeKnight and Loeb wanted to use immediately.

Elastic's Creative Director Patrick Clair "came up with the idea of making a red world that was revealed by liquid." Simulating the CG liquid, which was meant to be an ambiguous reference to poison and blood that behaved like "something in between liquid chocolate and tar", was difficult, with Clair saying "It's hard to make an algorithm act 'insidious'". CG Lead Andrew Romatz elaborated that "Developing the right consistency and behavior of the fluids was definitely a tricky process. Getting the scale to feel right was something that we had to play with quite a bit in simulation and also in lighting and texturing. Patrick wanted the sculptures we were forming to feel like miniatures, so we did a lot of experimenting with scene scale and with camera settings, simulating depth of field to achieve that look." Fluids Lead Miguel A. Salek stated that "Each shot required custom flow maps to be painted on the sculptures, along with small attraction fields and thousands of tiny adjustments to achieve the shapes and behavior Patrick was looking for. In the end I simulated hundreds of tests and thousands of frames of fluids to achieve just the right balance for each shot." Due to time constraints, references to Murdock's boxing history such as a punching bag and boxing ring were cut from the final sequence. The final sequence was animated to a temp track—"an old piece of 90s trip hop"—before John Paesano's music for the sequence was completed.

=== Filming ===
Filming for the series took place in New York City, in areas of Brooklyn and Long Island City that still look like the old Hell's Kitchen, in addition to soundstage work. The production had an eight-day-per-episode shooting schedule. On the feel of the show, DeKnight stated, "We're going for a gritty, 1970s New York feel for the show. We love the idea of beauty and the decay of the city, and Hell's Kitchen being a place that's both beautiful and gritty at the same time. And that's why Matt Murdock loves it and wants to protect it." The series' action sequences took inspiration from The Raid films. Matthew J. Lloyd was the director of photography for the first season, Martin Ahlgren for the second season, and Christopher LaVasseur for the third season.

Daredevil was known for its hallway fight sequences filmed as continuous shots. They occur in the season one episode, "Cut Man"; the season two episode, "New York's Finest"; and the season three episode, "Blindsided". "New York's Finest" used multiple takes and editing to stitch together the sequence to have it appear to be a continuous shot, while the sequences in the other two episodes were done as a true one shot.

=== Visual effects and editing ===
Visual effects for the series were completed by the New York studio Shade VFX. Bryan Goswin serves as visual effects supervisor. Editing for the series was done by Jonathan Chibnall, Monty DeGraff, Jo Francis, Michael N. Knue, and Damien Smith.

=== Music ===
It was revealed that John Paesano would be composing the music for the series in October 2014. The main theme of the series, which was co-composed by Braden Kimball, is derived from Paesano's original demo for the series, which he submitted during the auditioning process. Paesano noted that it is rare for such material to be incorporated into a final score like this. A soundtrack album for the first season was released digitally on April 27, 2015, for the second season on July 15, 2016, and for the third season on October 19, 2018.

=== Marvel Cinematic Universe tie-ins ===
If you live in New York, there are things that are going on all the time. I would never make light of the tragedy of 9/11, but 9/11 affected different neighborhoods in very different ways. They were all aware that this had happened, but the further down you got towards that area, the more affected you were by it. So we started with that sort of idea, that if the sky opened up and Chitauri were raining down with giant whales, and the Hulk and the Avengers were there to save the day, that's really exciting, but how did that affect the people who were six blocks over and three avenues down? That's the richness of the Marvel Universe. You can have that sort of thing happen and refer to it, but not have it be – we're not the world of the comics where you look up in the sky and Thor flies by all the time. This is a world where people do refer to Tony Stark as a billionaire in a tin suit, or the idea that they think there's a Thor out there with a magic hammer. But the truth of the matter is, 'I've never seen him. Have you ever seen him?' It's that kind of world that we exist in. For us, it makes Marvel what Marvel has always been, which is grounded.

— Jeph Loeb on the opportunities that Daredevil existing within the Marvel Cinematic Universe presents.

Daredevil was the first of the Marvel Netflix series, and was followed by Jessica Jones (2015–2019), Luke Cage (2016–2018), and Iron Fist (2017–2018), which led to the miniseries The Defenders (2017). In November 2013, Disney CEO Bob Iger stated that, if the characters prove popular on Netflix, "It's quite possible that they could become feature films," which Sarandos echoed in July 2015. In August 2014, D'Onofrio stated that after the "series stuff with Netflix", Marvel has "a bigger plan to branch out". In December 2014, Loeb explained that "Within the Marvel universe there are thousands of heroes of all shapes and sizes, but the Avengers are here to save the universe and Daredevil is here to save the neighborhood [...] It does take place in the Marvel Cinematic Universe. It's all connected. But that doesn't necessarily mean that we would look up in the sky and see [Iron Man]. It's just a different part of New York that we have not yet seen in the Marvel movies." Dawson later elaborated that "When you've got that level of superpowers, the fighting is different, the stakes are different, and it has a grander feel. In that world, they exist in it, so they know it and it's normal to them. But in reality when people are fighting and doing really bad, elicit [sic] crimes on the ground and there are guns and drugs—bones are going to break. People aren't hitting each other and nothing's going to happen because they're indestructible. These are people. They're vulnerable and you get to experience that."

In March 2015, Loeb spoke on the ability for the series to crossover with the MCU films and the ABC television series, saying, "As it is now, in the same way that our films started out as self-contained and then by the time we got to The Avengers, it became more practical for Captain America to do a little crossover into Thor 2 (2013) and for Bruce Banner to appear at the end of Iron Man 3 (2013). We have to earn that. The audience needs to understand who all of these characters are and what the world is before you then start co-mingling in terms of where it's going." In April, Cox stated that crossing over with the films is "possible. I think there's a way that the worlds can merge. I think our show feels tonally and thematically a bit different from the Avengers movies, but it's all one universe and I feel like there's a way for Daredevil—and other characters, Luke Cage and street level crime characters—to fit into that universe. I think there has to be a way, and I think it's about finding an autonomous tone for that [crossover] film". Cox also said that he is contractually obligated to appear in films if asked by Marvel. Cox expressed interest in making a cameo appearance in Captain America: Civil War (2016) due to Daredevil's presence in Mark Millar's 2006–2007 "Civil War" crossover storyline, which inspired the film, but acknowledged that he might had "missed the boat" due to principal photography having already commenced by that point. While writing Avengers: Infinity War (2018), Christopher Markus and Stephen McFeely talked about possibly having Daredevil and Luke Cage appear in the film's New York City scenes, but felt that including them for quick cameos would not have satisfied the audiences.

== Marketing ==
Disney Consumer Products created a small line of products to cater to a more adult audience, given the show's edgier tone. Paul Gitter, senior VP of Marvel Licensing for Disney Consumer Products explained that the focus would be more on teens and adults than very young people, with products at outlets like Hot Topic. Additionally, a Marvel Knights merchandise program was created to support the series, which creates new opportunities for individual product lines and collector focused products. Licensing partners wanted to pair up with Marvel, despite this not being a film project, given its previous successes. An update for the mobile fighting game Marvel Contest of Champions was released in November 2015, featuring a six-part story quest involving Daredevil and Jessica Jones along with a level based on Hell's Kitchen.

== Release ==
=== Streaming ===
Daredevil was released on the streaming service Netflix, in all territories where it is available, in Ultra HD 4K and High-dynamic-range video (HDR). The first two seasons were enhanced to be available in HDR after their initial release by post-production vendor Deluxe. The episodes for each season were released simultaneously, as opposed to a serialized format, to encourage binge-watching, a format which has been used for other Netflix original series. Daredevil was the first Netflix original series to receive its Descriptive Video Service audio description track. Despite being branded as a "Netflix Original", Daredevil was licensed to Netflix from Disney.

Daredevil was removed from Netflix on March 1, 2022, along with the other Marvel Netflix series, due to Netflix's license for the series ending and Disney regaining the rights. Disney opted not to have Netflix pay a large licensing fee to retain the distribution rights for the series, and instead announced that all the series would be made available on Disney+ on March 16 in the United States, Canada, United Kingdom, Ireland, Australia, and New Zealand, and in Disney+'s other markets by the end of 2022. In the United States, revised parental controls were introduced to the service to allow the more mature content of the series to be added, similarly to the controls that already exist for other regions that have the Star content hub.

=== Home media ===
Season	DVD release dates			Blu-ray release dates	
Season	Region 1	Region 2	Region 4	Region A	Region B
1	—N/a	October 3, 2016	December 7, 2016	November 8, 2016	October 3, 2016
2	August 22, 2017	May 15, 2017	June 14, 2017	August 22, 2017	May 15, 2017
3	—N/a	—N/a	—N/a	—N/a	—N/a

== Reception ==
=== Viewership ===
As Netflix does not reveal subscriber viewership numbers for any of their original series, Karim Zreik, senior vice president of original programming at Marvel Television, provided some viewership demographics for Daredevil in August 2017, noting that the series has attracted a large number of male viewers. Also in the month, Netflix released viewing patterns for the Marvel Netflix series. The data, which came from Netflix's "1,300 'taste communities' around the world, where subscribers are grouped based on what they watch", showed that viewers would not watch the series in chronological order by release, rather starting with Jessica Jones, then Daredevil, Luke Cage and finally Iron Fist. Todd Yellin, Netflix's vice president of product innovation, noted that audiences watch the series "in order of how they're interested in them and how they learn about them." Netflix's data also showed that a viewer watching Daredevil would most often then move on to Jessica Jones, and vice versa, while other series "with antiheroes and themes of moral ambiguity" such as Bloodline (2015–2017), Breaking Bad (2008–2013), Dexter (2006–2013) and House of Cards (2013–2018) led viewers to starting Daredevil. In October 2018, Crimson Hexagon, a consumer insights company, released data that examined the "social-media buzz" for the series to try to correlate it with potential viewership. The data showed that when the first season premiered in April 2015, the season had nearly 275,000 Twitter and Instagram posts regarding it. For when the second season was released in March 2016, the posts had declined to just over 200,000, and for the third season, looking at data gathered halfway through October 2018, the posts had declined to 75,000.

The series entered Nielsen Media Research's streaming list, which measures the number of minutes watched by United States audiences on television sets, as the eighth-most-watched original series across streaming services for the week of December 20–26, 2021, with 195 million minutes viewed. Daredevil's appearance on the list was believed to be from viewers returning to the series following Cox's appearance in Spider-Man: No Way Home (2021) and D'Onofrio's appearance in Hawkeye (2021). Following the release of Echo in January 2024, Daredevil experienced a notable increase in viewership on Disney+. According to market research company Parrot Analytics, which looks at consumer engagement in consumer research, streaming, downloads, and on social media, Daredevil remained highly in demand in Canada during the week of March 3–9, 2025. The series had a demand average of 35.3 times more than the average TV series in Canada. This performance placed Daredevil at No. 5 on the digital originals chart, following the premiere of its continuation, Daredevil: Born Again, which ranked higher at No. 2 with a demand average of 44.4. Luminate, which gathers viewership data from certain smart TVs in the U.S., reported a 153% increase in hours watched for Daredevil between the week prior to and the week of the premiere of Born Again.

=== Critical response ===
Critical response of Daredevil
Season	Rotten Tomatoes	Metacritic
1	99% (72 reviews)	75 (22 reviews)
2	81% (57 reviews)	68 (13 reviews)
3	97% (67 reviews)	71 (6 reviews)

The review aggregation website Rotten Tomatoes reported a 99% approval rating for the first season, based on 72 reviews, with an average rating of 8.1/10. The website's critical consensus reads, "With tight adherence to its source material's history, high production quality, and a no-nonsense dramatic flair, Daredevil excels as an effective superhero origin story, a gritty procedural, and an exciting action adventure." Metacritic, which uses a weighted average, assigned a score of 75 out of 100, based on 22 critics, indicating "generally favorable reviews".

The second season has an 81% approval rating on Rotten Tomatoes, based on 57 reviews, with an average rating of 7.1/10. The site's critical consensus reads, "Bolstered by some impressive action, Daredevil keeps its footing in season two, even if its new adversaries can't quite fill the void left by Wilson Fisk." On Metacritic, it has a score of 68 out of 100, based on 13 critics, indicating "generally favorable reviews".

The third season has a 97% approval rating on Rotten Tomatoes, based on 67 reviews, with an average rating of 8.1/10. The site's critical consensus reads, "The Man with No Fear returns to top form with a third season that begins tediously slow but gradually generates comic book thrills, immeasurably helped by the welcome return of Vincent D'Onofrio's menacing Kingpin." On Metacritic, it has a score of 71 out of 100, based on 6 critics, indicating "generally favorable reviews".

In 2026, Casey Loving at TheWrap ranked the series' hallway fight scenes with the season three sequence as the best, followed by the sequences in season one and then season two. He believed it was "fascinating" that each sequence reflected the respective strengths and weaknesses of each season, concluding that each season was "only as good as its hallway fight". Loving said the season three sequence was "nothing short of magic, a fight scene with gripping choreography that tells a complete story from beginning to end" and "a total technical achievement". For the season one sequence, Loving noted how it helped "forever define the visual language" of the character, given all the subsequent live-action appearances of Daredevil have featured a continuous shot fight. While the second season sequence "[ups] the ante" from the first season, Loving was disappointed it used editing stitches to make it a single shot and felt the camerawork was "too claustrophobic" and Murdock did not exhibit the same level of "scrappiness" seen in the other two sequences.

=== Accolades ===
In December 2015, IGN named Daredevil the second best Netflix original programming series released to date.

Accolades
Year	Award	Category	Recipient	Result	Ref.
2015	Camerimage	Best Cinematography – Pilot	"Into the Ring"	Nominated	
2015	EWwy Awards	Best Supporting Actor in a Drama Series	Vincent D'Onofrio	Nominated	
2015	Helen Keller Achievement Award	Honoree	Charlie Cox	Won	
2015	Online Film & Television Association Award	Best New Titles Sequence	Daredevil	Won	
2015	Primetime Creative Arts Emmy Awards	Outstanding Main Title Design	Daredevil	Nominated	
2015	Primetime Creative Arts Emmy Awards	Outstanding Sound Editing for a Series	"Speak of the Devil"	Nominated	
2015	Primetime Creative Arts Emmy Awards	Outstanding Special and Visual Effects in a Supporting Role	"Speak of the Devil"	Nominated	
2015	Screen Actors Guild Awards	Outstanding Performance by a Stunt Ensemble in a Television Series	Daredevil	Nominated	
2016	Empire Awards	Best TV Series	Daredevil	Nominated	
2016	Golden Reel Awards	Outstanding Achievement in Sound Editing – Dialogue and ADR for Episodic Short Form Broadcast Media	Daredevil	Nominated	
2016	Saturn Awards	Best Supporting Actor on Television	Scott Glenn	Nominated	
2016	Saturn Awards	Best New Media Television Series	Daredevil	Won	
2016	Saturn Awards	Best Guest Starring Role on Television	Vincent D'Onofrio	Nominated	
2016	Saturn Awards	Best Actor on Television	Charlie Cox	Nominated	
2016	SXSW Film Festival	Excellence in Title Design	Daredevil	Nominated	
2016	Visual Effects Society Awards	Outstanding Supporting Visual Effects in a Photoreal Episode	"Speak of the Devil"	Nominated	
2016	Got Your 6	6 Certified – for "a representative and balanced depiction of veterans"	"Semper Fidelis"	Won	
2016	Online Film & Television Association Award	Best Sound in a Series	Daredevil	Nominated	
2016	Primetime Creative Arts Emmy Awards	Outstanding Sound Editing for a Series	"New York's Finest"	Nominated	
2016	Primetime Creative Arts Emmy Awards	Outstanding Stunt Coordination for a Drama Series, Limited Series or Movie	Philip J. Silvera	Nominated	
2017	Saturn Awards	Best Actor on Television	Charlie Cox	Nominated	
2017	Saturn Awards	Best New Media Television Series	Daredevil	Nominated	
2017	Screen Actors Guild Awards	Outstanding Performance by a Stunt Ensemble in a Television Series	Daredevil	Nominated	
2019	Saturn Awards	Best Actor in a Streaming Television Series	Charlie Cox	Nominated	
2019	Saturn Awards	Best Streaming Superhero Series	Daredevil	Won	
2019	Saturn Awards	Best Supporting Actress in a Streaming Television Series	Deborah Ann Woll	Nominated	
2019	Screen Actors Guild Awards	Outstanding Performance by a Stunt Ensemble in a Television Series	Daredevil	Nominated	

== Spin-off ==
By January 2016, ahead of the debut of Bernthal as armed vigilante Frank Castle / Punisher in season two, Netflix was in "very early development" on a spin-off series titled The Punisher, and was looking for a showrunner. The series would be centered on Bernthal as Castle, and was described as a stand-alone project, outside of the series leading up to The Defenders. Loeb implied that Marvel Television had not instigated the development of the spin-off and were focusing on making "the best 13 episodes of Daredevil season two" at the time, but did say, "I'm never going to discourage a network from looking at one of our characters and encouraging us to do more [...] If we are lucky enough that through the writing, through the direction, through the actor that people want to see more of that person, terrific." In April 2016, Marvel and Netflix ordered The Punisher, confirmed Bernthal's involvement and named Steve Lightfoot as showrunner. The series was released in November 2017. Woll reprises her role as Karen Page in the series.

== Future ==
=== Cancellation ===
Ahead of the release of season three, Deadline Hollywood noted the series was expected to be renewed for a fourth season since it was "widely watched and critically acclaimed". Oleson pitched what he wanted to do with a fourth season to Netflix in November 2018, and was hoping that this meeting would lead to an official renewal of the series. Despite the pitch, on November 29, 2018, Netflix canceled the series after three seasons. Netflix said the three seasons would remain on the service, while the character would "live on in future projects for Marvel". Deadline Hollywood noted, that "unlike Iron Fist or Luke Cage, the door seems to be wide open" for the series to continue elsewhere, potentially on Disney's streaming service, Disney+. However, The Hollywood Reporter felt this was unlikely, especially since, per the original deal between Marvel and Netflix for the series, the characters cannot appear in any non-Netflix series or films for at least two years following the cancellation of Daredevil, as reported by Variety. Kevin A. Mayer, chairman of Walt Disney Direct-to-Consumer and International, noted that, while it had not yet been discussed, it was a possibility that Disney+ could revive the series.

Cox was saddened by the cancellation, since it "felt like we had a lot of stories to tell", especially since he had been excited by what had been discussed for a potential fourth season. He added that many of the cast and crew "really expected to keep going" and that he was hopeful there would be an opportunity to portray the character again in some form. Amy Rutberg, who portrays Marci Stahl in the series, confirmed the two-year wait requirement and also said the decision to cancel the series came as a surprise to the executives at Marvel given the extensive work that had been done for a potential fourth season. She added that filming for the fourth season had been expected to begin around February 2019 and many of the cast and crew felt the series would last for five seasons, with a new antagonist in the fourth before a final showdown between Daredevil and Fisk in the fifth. Oleson expanded on this, revealing several storylines that were planned for the series. For the fourth season, Alice Eve was expected to appear as Mary Walker / Typhoid Mary, continuing from her role in the second season of Iron Fist (2018), in a "warped love story/murder mystery" storyline, with Walker as a "modern-day feminist" femme fatale. Owlsley's son would have also appeared as a more comics-accurate Owl out for revenge for the death of his father. In the fifth season, Poindexter would have returned as Bullseye. It had also been planned to progress Melvin Potter towards his Gladiator supervillain persona from the comics. In February 2019, Hulu's senior vice president of originals Craig Erwich said the streaming service was open to reviving the series, along with the other former Netflix series.

=== Integration with Marvel Studios and Born Again ===
In June 2020, Cox was contacted by Marvel Studios president Kevin Feige about reprising his role in Marvel Studios' MCU productions, with Feige confirming in December 2021 that Cox would reprise the role for Marvel Studios, first doing so in the film Spider-Man: No Way Home (2021). Additionally, D'Onofrio first reprised his role as Kingpin in the Disney+ series Hawkeye (2021). At that time, Jessica Henwick, who portrayed Colleen Wing in the Marvel Netflix series, indicated that Cox had known about the opportunity to reprise the role in Marvel Studios productions years prior.

In March 2022, a Daredevil reboot series was revealed to be in development, with Feige and Chris Gary producing. The series was confirmed to be in development for Disney+ in late May, with Matt Corman and Chris Ord attached as head writers and executive producers. The series, titled Daredevil: Born Again, was officially announced that July for an 18-episode first season, with Cox and D'Onofrio confirmed to return. Cox described Born Again as a "whole new thing" and not a fourth season of the Netflix series. In late September 2023, the series underwent a creative overhaul after a few episodes had been filmed to bring it more in line with the Netflix series. Corman and Ord were let go as head writers, as were the directors for the remainder of the series, with Dario Scardapane, a writer on The Punisher, hired to serve as showrunner and filmmaking duo Justin Benson and Aaron Moorhead hired to direct the remaining episodes of the first season; a few of the directors from before the creative overhaul retained credit on the first season. The series was also split from its announced 18-episode season into two, nine-episode seasons. Born Again does not incorporate any of the planned material for the fourth season of Daredevil. Bernthal, Woll, Henson, Bethel, and Zurer also reprise their roles as Frank Castle / Punisher, Karen Page, Foggy Nelson, Benjamin "Dex" Poindexter, and Vanessa Fisk in Born Again. The first season of Born Again premiered on Disney+ in March 2025. In Born Again's second season, which premiered in March 2026, Moore reprises his role as James Wesley, Royce Johnson reprises his role as Brett Mahoney, and Geoffrey Cantor reprises his role as Mitchell Ellison. The Hand appears in the film Spider-Man: Brand New Day (2026), while Dawson filmed a scene for Brand New Day reprising her role as Claire Temple that was cut from the final film, but appears in its extended cut, [Brand New] Brand New Day. Yung will reprise her role as Elektra in Born Again's third season, which will premiere in 2027 and be the series' last.

Ahead of Cox and D'Onofrio's appearances in Echo, which released in January 2024, Marvel Studios' head of streaming Brad Winderbaum acknowledged that Marvel Studios had previously been "a little bit cagey" about what was part of their Sacred Timeline, noting how there had been the corporate divide between what Marvel Studios created and what Marvel Television created. He continued that as time has passed, Marvel Studios has begun to see "how well integrated the [Marvel Television] stories are" and personally felt "confident" in saying Daredevil was part of the Sacred Timeline. Marvel Studios began looking at the Netflix series as a more integral part to the MCU once Daredevil: Born Again underwent a creative overhaul in September 2023. Footage from the series was used in promotional material for Echo. With Echo's release, all of the Netflix series were retroactively added to the MCU Disney+ timeline, with Daredevil placed alongside the Phase Two content of the MCU, between the Guardians of the Galaxy films and Avengers: Age of Ultron (2015). An update to the Disney+ timeline split out the series by season, with Daredevil's second season placed after Ant-Man (2015), and the third before Thor: Ragnarok (2017).
