= Claire Temple =

Marvel Comics fictional character

- Claire meets Luke Cage, from Luke Cage, Hero for Hire #2 (August 1972)

Publication information
- Publisher: Marvel Comics
- First appearance: Luke Cage, Hero for Hire #2 (August 1972)
- Created by: Archie Goodwin; George Tuska

In-story information
- Team affiliations: Heroes for Hire
- Supporting character of: Luke Cage
- Abilities: Doctor

Claire Temple is a character appearing in American comic books published by Marvel Comics. She is a medical doctor primarily affiliated with the superhero Luke Cage and is one of his early love interests.

Starting in 2015, a version of the character, portrayed by Rosario Dawson, has appeared in multiple episodes of the Marvel Cinematic Universe streaming television series, such as the first two seasons of Daredevil, an episode of the first season of Jessica Jones, Luke Cage, the first season of Iron Fist and The Defenders. She is a composite of the comic book version of Temple and the comic book character Night Nurse (aka Linda Carter).

== Publication history ==
Claire Temple first appeared in Luke Cage, Hero for Hire #2 and was created by Archie Goodwin and George Tuska.

== Fictional character biography ==
=== Luke Cage ===
Luke Cage meets Dr. Claire Temple, who works with Dr. Noah Burstein at his 42nd Street storefront clinic. Cage has been shot by hitmen sent by the criminal Diamondback, and Claire is surprised to find him only bruised by the bullets. She is subsequently kidnapped by Diamondback, who Cage discovers is his old friend Willis Stryker, the man who had framed Cage for the crime that sent him to prison. Cage frees Claire, but Diamondback is killed by one of his own weapons. Claire corroborates Cage's story with the police, and the two become romantically involved. As Claire and Cage continue dating, Dr. Burstein—who is partially responsible for giving Cage his powers—hides from Claire and Daily Bugle reporter Phil Fox that Cage had escaped from prison. Having discovered Cage's secret but unable to publish it, Fox works with Cage's prison guard nemesis Billy Bob Rackham to get revenge on Cage by kidnapping Claire. They kidnap the wrong woman, Fox is killed and the police find Claire holding the murder weapon. Rackham is revealed as the murderer, exonerating Claire, who is reunited with Cage.

In the now-retitled Luke Cage, Power Man #18 (April 1974), Cage mourns his ex-girlfriend Reva Connors, who had been killed because of his rivalry with Willis Stryker. Despite Cage's belief that everyone who gets close to him dies, he and Claire decide to stay together. The relationship continues for years, with Claire often in danger because of her connection to Cage. Cage is finally exonerated for the crime that originally put him in prison, but Claire can no longer handle him constantly being in danger, and they separate.

=== Other appearances ===
In All-New, All-Different Marvel, Claire is a doctor who specializes in dealing with super-powered humans and bionic implants. She first appears in December 2015 in Captain America: Sam Wilson #4, where she treats Captain America (Sam Wilson) when he is transformed into a werewolf by Karl Malus.

== In other media ==
- Claire Temple, with elements of Night Nurse, appears in Marvel's Netflix television series, portrayed by Rosario Dawson. Introduced in Daredevil, Temple makes subsequent appearances in Jessica Jones, Luke Cage, Iron Fist,, The Defenders. and Spider-Man: Brand New Day. Temple's appearance in Spider-Man: Brand New Day was initially cut from the film but was restored in an extended version titled Spider-Man: [Brand New] Brand New Day.
- Claire Temple appears as a playable character in Marvel Avengers Academy, voiced by Tiana Camacho.
