= Typhoid Mary (character) =

Marvel Comics fictional character

- Textless cover of Daredevil #46 (June 2003). Art by Alex Maleev.

Publication information
- Publisher: Marvel Comics
- First appearance: As Typhoid Mary: Daredevil #254 (May 1988); As Mutant Zero: Avengers: The Initiative #4 (September 2007)
- Created by: Ann Nocenti; John Romita Jr.

In-story information
- Alter ego: Mary Alice Walker
- Species: Human mutant
- Team affiliations: Hand; The Initiative; Shadow Initiative; Woman's Action Movement; Sisterhood of Mutants
- Notable aliases: Mutant Zero
- Abilities: Highly skilled athlete; Trained martial artist; Exceptional swordswoman; Excellent physical condition; Peak-level agility and reflexes; Pyrokinesis; Telekinesis; Limited mind control; Via Mutant Zero armor: Enhanced strength; Arsenal of bladed weapons

Typhoid Mary (Mary Alice Walker), also known as Bloody Mary and Mutant Zero, is a supervillain appearing in American comic books published by Marvel Comics. The character was initially depicted as an enemy of Daredevil suffering from dissociative identity disorder, but has also come into conflict with Spider-Man and Deadpool.

The character was portrayed in the film Elektra by Natassia Malthe. Alice Eve portrayed the character in the second season of the Marvel Cinematic Universe television series Iron Fist (2018).

== Publication history ==
Typhoid Mary first appeared in Daredevil #254 (May 1988), and was created by writer Ann Nocenti and artist John Romita Jr. Her name comes from early 20th-century Irish-American cook and typhoid fever carrier "Typhoid Mary" Mallon. As depicted in the early stories, Typhoid Mary has dissociative identity disorder; while her "Typhoid" identity is evil, her alter ego, Mary Walker, is sweet and reserved, and enters into a relationship with Daredevil. Nocenti created Typhoid Mary after reflecting on experiences working in asylums for the mentally ill, about the condition of bipolar disorder, and about stereotypes regarding women in comic books.

The character first appeared disguised as Mutant Zero in Avengers: The Initiative #4 (September 2007) as a member of Henry Peter Gyrich's black ops team. Prior to this, writer Dan Slott stated that the "mysterious character" was secretly a well-known character in disguise.

== Fictional character biography ==
Typhoid Mary is an enemy and former lover of Daredevil with low level psionic powers, including telekinesis. She has been a professional criminal employed by organized crime syndicates as an assassin in the past. Born Lyla, she grew up "somewhere out in New Mexico" and ran away from home to escape an abusive father. She came to New York City hoping to become a dancer or an actress, but she instead started working for a brothel frequented by criminals and organized crime.

Mary has dissociative identity disorder and three alternate personalities. Her "Mary" personality is timid, quiet, and pacifistic; her "Typhoid" personality is adventurous, lustful, and violent; and her "Bloody Mary" persona is brutal, sadistic, and misandrous. Mary once claimed that there was a fourth personality who is 'lost' but has not since been mentioned. Aside from highly developed martial arts skills, she also possesses telekinetic powers and pyrokinesis, the ability to ignite people or objects in her vicinity.

In her first appearance, she met Matt Murdock, and was hired as an assassin by the Kingpin. A favorite pawn of the Kingpin, Mary has been romantically involved with both him and Daredevil. Through hypnosis, Mary's alternate personalities are suppressed and she attempts to have a normal life, becoming an actress. Mary battles Spider-Man when her Bloody Mary persona resurfaces and begins killing men who committed domestic abuse. With Spider-Man's help, Mary regains control and voluntarily turns herself in to the police for treatment.

While in a mental institution, each of Mary's personalities hires a different mercenary. Mary hires Deadpool to kill her, while Typhoid and Bloody Mary hire Deadpool and Vamp to break them out of confinement. Deadpool defeats Vamp, but refuses to kill Mary, allowing the Typhoid personality to become dominant. Deadpool and Mary eventually separate after she tricks Deadpool into having sex with her while disguised as Siryn, making him feel betrayed and violated.

Mutant Zero. Art by Stefano Caselli.

At some point after the superhuman Civil War's events, Mary is found and recruited into Henry Peter Gyrich's Initiative program and the Shadow Initiative. She is given the identity Mutant Zero, with her true identity being kept secret from her teammates. Gyrich reveals that Mary is a mutant who retained her powers following M-Day, but was not included in the official record of the remaining mutants. Mutant Zero leaves the Initiative after Taskmaster exposes her identity.

Typhoid Mary joins the Sisterhood of Mutants, as Lady Deathstrike promises to use Arkea to reintegrate Mary's personalities, which Arkea then does. The sisterhood, specifically Arkea and Amora, resurrect Selene and Madelyne Pryor. Before the Sisterhood can recruit additional members and go on an offensive, the X-Men attack. Typhoid Mary is defeated by Psylocke. Arkea is killed, while Madelyne swears to maintain the Sisterhood and continue the war against the X-Men.

== Powers and abilities ==
Typhoid Mary is a mutant and possesses a number of limited psionic powers. She can use telekinesis to levitate small objects over short distances (such as weapons of under 10 pounds; knives, razors, etc., which her "Bloody Mary" persona often gathered and assembled into improvised battle-armor). She is a powerful pyrokinetic, meaning she can cause spontaneous combustion within line of sight to set objects in her immediate vicinity aflame. She can implant mental suggestions in the minds of others. She can use her psionic hypnosis ability to induce sleep in weak-minded individuals and most animals; certain individuals are mentally resistant to her hypnotic powers.

However, she has three separate personalities as a result of her mental illness. The timid, pacifist "Mary" personality has no psionic abilities. The "Typhoid" personality has the full range of these psionic powers which are strongest in the "Bloody Mary" personality. Her original "Mary Walker" personality is supposed to be a balanced amalgam of all of these, but is seldom dominant. Because of the different heart rates and voice patterns of her different personas, not to mention the different ways of dress, even Daredevil's super-senses were long unable to tell the different personas all belonged to the same woman, and she took advantage of this situation to hide from Daredevil/Matt Murdock even within earshot.

As Mutant Zero, Mary appears to possess the same psionic powers utilized by both Typhoid and Bloody Mary. It is unknown whether the powers Mutant Zero possesses are equal to or stronger than those of Bloody Mary. Recent battles suggest they are more powerful, but take their toll on Mary when used as a result of this strength. Mutant Zero is also equipped with a suit of full body armor that appears to enhance her physical strength and an arsenal of weapons, including guns and various blades.

Typhoid Mary is in excellent physical condition. She has sufficient reflexes to block and redirect a bullet back at its shooter. She has peak human agility, and is highly athletic. She is also trained in the martial arts, particularly Judo and Kendo. She has exceptional skill in wielding and throwing bladed weapons, and is usually armed with a variety of machetes and smaller knives.

== In other media ==
=== Television ===
- Typhoid Mary appears in Avengers Assemble, voiced by Tara Strong. This version is an enforcer for the Red Skull. Additionally, a pirate-themed Battleworld version of Mary appears in the episode "The Vibranium Coast".
- Mary Walker appears in the second season of Iron Fist, portrayed by Alice Eve. This version is a former special ops soldier whose dissociative identity disorder was triggered after her squad was ambushed in Sokovia. While she became the sole survivor, she was held captive, tortured, and raped for two years before managing to escape. Additionally, she is aware of two personalities, the kind and friendly "Mary" and the malevolent fighter "Walker", with an unnamed third secretly manifesting later in the series. Walker later discovers the third personality has begun operating as a vigilante serial killer.

=== Film ===
Typhoid Mary, referred to simply as Typhoid, appears in Elektra, portrayed by Natassia Malthe.

=== Video games ===
- Typhoid Mary appears in The Amazing Spider-Man vs. The Kingpin. This version is one of the Kingpin's personal bodyguards.
- Typhoid Mary makes a cameo appearance in The Punisher. This version is the Kingpin's loyal enforcer.

== Bibliography ==
- Langley, Travis, ed. (2018). Daredevil Psychology: The Devil You Know. Sterling Publishing. ISBN 978-1-4549-3011-2.
  - Vecchiolla, Laura. "What Lurks in Shadow: Jung's Notion of the Devil and Evil in Daredevil". In Langley (2018), pp. 175-186.
