= Iron Fist season 2 =

Iron Fist
- Season 2
- Promotional poster
- Showrunner: M. Raven Metzner
- Starring: Finn Jones; Jessica Henwick; Tom Pelphrey; Jessica Stroup; Sacha Dhawan; Simone Missick; Alice Eve
- No. of episodes: 10

Release
- Original network: Netflix
- Original release: September 7, 2018

Season chronology
- ← Previous; Season 1

The second and final season of the American streaming television series Iron Fist, which is based on the Marvel Comics character of the same name, follows Danny Rand / Iron Fist, a martial arts expert with the ability to call upon the power of the Iron Fist. It is set in the Marvel Cinematic Universe (MCU), sharing continuity with the films and other television series of the franchise. The season was produced by Marvel Television in association with ABC Studios, with Raven Metzner serving as showrunner.

Finn Jones stars as Rand, who protects New York following the events of The Defenders. Jessica Henwick, Tom Pelphrey, Jessica Stroup, and Sacha Dhawan also return from the first season to star and are joined by Simone Missick, reprising her role from previous Marvel Netflix series, and Alice Eve. The season was ordered in July 2017, with Metzner replacing Scott Buck as showrunner. Filming for the season began in late 2017 in New York City and continued until May 2018. Focus was placed on improving the fight sequences for the series after criticisms of the first season, with Clayton Barber taking over as fight coordinator after doing so for the MCU film Black Panther. Each episode in the season is named after a comics issue that Rand has appeared in.

The season was released on September 7, 2018, on Netflix and consists of ten episodes. The season received mixed reviews from critics but was considered a major improvement over the previous season. Netflix canceled the series on October 12, 2018.

== Episodes ==
No. overall	No. in season	Title (Note: Each episode is named after the issue title of various comics Danny Rand has appeared in.)	Directed by	Written by	Original release date
14	1	"The Fury of Iron Fist"	David Dobkin	M. Raven Metzner	September 7, 2018
Billionaire Danny Rand moves in with his girlfriend Colleen Wing, living in her Chinatown, New York City dojo. At night he fights criminals on the streets using the magical power of the Iron Fist, and sees an increase in crime between gangs such as the Golden Tigers and the Hatchets following the destruction of the Hand. (Note: As depicted in The Defenders (2017).) Wing finds a box bearing the kamon of her family, who pushed her away years earlier. She begins investigating where the box may have come from, and comes to believe that furniture shop owner Frank Choi may know of its origin. He goes missing when he is unable to pay the Golden Tigers for protection. Rand and Ward Meachum—who runs Rand Enterprises, Rand's company—meet with Ward's sister Joy, who asks for them to buy her out of the company; Rand agrees. Joy is working with Davos, who was raised with Rand in the mystical city of K'un-Lun. Davos confronts Rand, hinting that he has discovered a way to take the Iron Fist from Rand. Davos believes it is his birthright, but Rand refuses to give it up.
15	2	"The City's Not for Burning"	Rachel Talalay	Jon Worley	September 7, 2018
Years earlier, Rand earned the right to gain the Iron Fist after being named the winner of a duel against Davos in K'un-Lun by Davos's father Lei Kung, though Davos had not conceded defeat to Rand. Now, fighting between the Golden Tigers and the Hatchets escalates and Rand is unable to convince Hai-Qing Yang, the leader of the Hatchets, to look for a peaceful resolution to the conflict. On the streets, Rand meets a strange newcomer to the city, Mary, and helps her by giving her directions and trying to protect her from the gang violence. She develops feelings for Rand in response to his kindness. Joy and Davos use blackmail to acquire an antique bowl from Mika Prada, an old acquaintance of Joy's. Wing convinces Yang's wife Sherry to talk her husband into peace. Davos later meets with Yang regarding shipments that he has coming into the Hatchet's docks; when he learns that the group can no longer secure his items, given that they now plan to share the docks with the Golden Tigers, Davos gives Yang a stroke.
16	3	"This Deadly Secret..."	Toa Fraser	Tatiana Suarez-Pico	September 7, 2018
Learning of Joy and Davos's partnership, Ward asks Rand to invite the pair over for dinner so they can all discuss their differences. Despite Davos's protests, Joy agrees to avoid suspicion. Mary leaves a set of surveillance photos showing Rand and Wing at the dojo, and when Rand confronts her about them, Mary says that they are being watched by someone named Walker. Ward believes that someone at his Narcotics Anonymous (NA) meetings is working for Joy, and becomes paranoid. He ultimately does not come to the dinner. Joy and Davos feign niceties until Wing demands that they discuss their grievances with Rand. Davos finds the surveillance photos, which he and Joy had arranged to be taken, and the pair leave. Rand and Wing come to an attempted parlay between the Hatchets, now represented by Mrs. Yang, and the Golden Tigers. Negotiations turn sour, and Rand, Wing and Mrs. Yang defend themselves against the Golden Tigers. Davos and Joy confront Mary—actually Walker—about the photos.
17	4	"Target: Iron Fist"	M. J. Bassett	Jenny Lynn	September 7, 2018
Joy learns that Walker has dissociative identity disorder, with Mary being an alternate personality; Walker insists that she can control Mary. Rand attempts to reignite peace talks between the triads, but the Golden Tigers have already seized the docks and the Hatchets are preparing to fight back. Rand visits Yang and realizes that Davos had caused the stroke. Yang is able to tell Rand what Davos was having brought in at the docks. Rand and Wing are met by Detective Misty Knight, a friend who Rand gave a robotic arm to after she lost hers fighting the Hand. (Note: As depicted in The Defenders and the second season of Luke Cage.) Knight explains that the trap Rand had seen was actually police officers watching the parlay, and asks Rand to stay away from now on. He instead goes to the docks on his own, but Davos has already killed the Golden Tiger soldiers there and taken what he wanted: the tattooed skin from the corpse of an old Iron Fist. Rand is attacked, drugged, and taken by Walker to the site of a ritual in which the bowl, skin, and Rand's blood are used to transfer the power of the Iron Fist to Davos.
18	5	"Heart of the Dragon"	Mairzee Almas	Declan de Barra	September 7, 2018
Bleeding out, Rand is found by a group of local kids who have started their own triad. They plan to give Rand to the Golden Tigers in exchange for a bounty. Wing and Knight attempt to find Rand by tracking down Walker, and get Ward's help to quickly run a fingerprint search on the surveillance photos. Davos looks to become the Iron Fist that Rand never was, starting with ending the triad war himself. He goes to a nightclub owned by the Golden Tigers and kills their leadership. Joy begins to fear what Davos may do to her, and hires Walker for protection. One of the kids holding Rand, BB—who Wing had run into several times before—is convinced by Rand to call Wing. She and Knight find Rand, and Ward gets his NA sponsor Bethany to tend to Rand's injuries. While Ward stays with Rand, Wing and Knight go to ensure that Joy is safe and find her with Walker. Wing and Knight overpower Walker, and take the two back to the dojo where Joy confirms that she knew what Davos planned all along and had wanted to hurt Rand.
19	6	"The Dragon Dies at Dawn"	Philip John	Matthew White	September 7, 2018
Joy reveals that the ritual was carried out by three tattoo artists called the Crane Sisters. Hoping that they can reverse the process, Wing and Knight go to find them leaving Ward to watch over Rand, Joy, and Walker. Walker agrees to take Rand back to where the ritual took place to confront Davos, leaving Ward and Joy to discuss their relationship. Joy refuses to forgive Ward and leaves him. After explaining that they are accessories to a crime, Knight gets the Crane Sisters to agree to reversing the ritual. Walker reveals to Rand that she actually plans to kill Davos before running away to live in a secluded cabin in peace. This would allow her to avoid any of the triggers that bring Mary to the surface. Rand convinces her to take Davos hostage instead, and when he returns from his killing spree across the city Davos is subdued. He manages to break Rand's leg before falling unconscious. Walker calls an ambulance for Rand, but Davos is left behind when Mary is triggered and runs away after hearing that Walker plans to keep her trapped.
20	7	"Morning of the Mindstorm"	Stephen Surjik	Rebecca Dameron	September 7, 2018
With the help of a state-of-the-art leg brace, Rand begins to recover from his injury but is unable to fight. Knight hopes to gain the help of the local police precinct to stop Davos, but Captain William Pike is unwilling to do so since Davos is putting an end to organized crime in the neighborhood. In addition to continuing his killing spree, Davos recruits the gang of local kids and plans to train them as soldiers to help fight his war against crime in New York City. Rand also wants to begin training again, hoping that Wing will re-open her dojo for teaching. She does not want to take the responsibility for a student who could fight and die, but eventually relents and begins training Rand to fight with his injury. Knight learns the requirements of the ritual from Prada, and goes in search of more help. Ward turns to alcohol to drown his sorrows, despite the protests of Bethany. Ward later hears her reveal in an NA meeting that she is pregnant with his child. Joy visits Mary, who realizes that she is protected by Walker. Mary leaves an encouraging message for Walker.
21	8	"Citadel on the Edge of Vengeance"	Julian Holmes	Melissa Glenn	September 7, 2018
Walker watches Mary's message, and is confused when Mary thanks her for breaking them out of a Sokovian prison where they were a prisoner-of-war for years while serving in the military. Walker always believed that it was Mary who broke them out, and psychiatrist Paul Edmonds suggests that they may have another alternate personality; Walker dismisses this idea. Joy attempts to undermine Davos by searching for the bowl, and asks Ward to take over a business venture that she is carrying out in the memory of their mother. He worries that she is in danger, and Walker agrees to help him kill Davos. BB helps Joy steal the bowl, while Davos unsuccessfully tries to convince the wider community of the nobility of his crusade. The remnants of the triads band together to stop him, and all Rand can do is try and stop him first. Wing tries to teach Rand to overcome his emotional bond to Davos, allowing him to realize the negative impact on his life that the Iron Fist has had. Rand suggests that Wing should take the power from Davos.
22	9	"War Without End"	Sanford Bookstaver	Daniel Shattuck	September 7, 2018
Wing refuses to take the power of the Iron Fist. Knight returns with a police taskforce ready to capture Davos, as well as Frank Choi who had cut a deal to turn on the Golden Tigers. From Choi's information, Wing deduces that her mother came to New York and could still be in the city. Davos discovers the missing bowl, and critically injures Joy by pushing her off a balcony. BB contacts the rest of his gang, hoping that they will see reason, but they tell Davos that he has gone to a community center where Wing volunteers. Rand and Wing go to the center to stop the combined triads from mobilizing to attack, but Davos and his gang arrive. BB faces his gang, and is killed. Wing fights the rest off until Knight and the police can arrive. Rand overpowers Davos and meets the Crane Sisters at the dojo to undertake the ritual again. Mourning BB, Wing agrees to take the Iron Fist, but the ritual is interrupted leaving both Davos and Wing with the power. Knight, Ward, and Walker find Joy, and Ward takes her to safety. Walker then attacks Knight.
23	10	"A Duel of Iron"	Jonas Pate	M. Raven Metzner	September 7, 2018
In pain from the interrupted ceremony, Davos flees back to his hideout and is pursued by Wing, also in pain, and Rand. Walker waits for Davos to return and attempts to kill him, but Rand warns that killing Davos will kill Wing as well until the ritual is complete. Knight wakes up, escapes capture, and helps Rand stop Walker by triggering Mary. Wing fights Davos, and is able to draw the rest of the Iron Fist power out of him. With Davos arrested, Rand is unsure of his purpose in life. Wing prepares to protect the streets of Chinatown as the new Iron Fist, while Joy attempts to return to her normal life. Walker, considering the possibility of having another, more violent identity, decides to stay affiliated with Joy and her influence. Ward attempts to reconcile with Bethany, but she chooses to raise their child on her own. Rand decides to leave New York to find Orson Randall, the man from whom Davos acquired the Iron Fist corpse. Ward travels with him, and months later Rand has stolen two guns from Randall with which he can form Iron Fists.

== Cast and characters ==
=== Main ===
- Finn Jones as Danny Rand / Iron Fist
- Jessica Henwick as Colleen Wing
- Tom Pelphrey as Ward Meachum
- Jessica Stroup as Joy Meachum
- Sacha Dhawan as Davos
- Simone Missick as Misty Knight
- Alice Eve as Mary Walker

=== Recurring ===
- Giullian Yao Gioiello as BB
- Natalie Smith as Bethany
- Jason Lai as Rhyno
- Christine Toy Johnson as Sherry Yang
- James Chen as Sam Chung
- Jowin Marie Batoon as Torx
- Sydney Mae Diaz as Hex
- Fernando Chien as Chen Wu

=== Notable guests ===
- Henry Yuk as Hai-Qing Yang
- Hoon Lee as Lei Kung
- Andrew Pang as Donnie Chang
- Murray Bartlett as Paul Edmonds
- Rob Morgan as Turk Barrett

== Production ==
=== Development ===
In January 2015, Netflix CCO Ted Sarandos stated the series was "eligible to go into multiple seasons for sure" and Netflix would look at "how well [they] are addressing both the Marvel fanbase but also the broader fanbase" in terms of determining whether additional seasons would be appropriate. In July 2015, Sarandos said some of the Defenders series would "selectively have multiple seasons as they come out of the gate." At San Diego Comic-Con in 2017, the second season of Iron Fist was announced, with Raven Metzner taking over as showrunner from Scott Buck, who served that role for the first season. Marvel Television head and series executive producer Jeph Loeb explained that Marvel had known Buck would be unavailable for the next season of Iron Fist due to his commitments to another Marvel series, Inhumans, so the studio began looking for a replacement showrunner. Metzner pitched a story for the season that excited Marvel, and Loeb compared the change to a new writer taking over on a comic.

=== Writing ===
The season begins after the events of The Defenders, and sees Rand fulfill his promise to protect New York following the supposed death of Matt Murdock / Daredevil at the end of that miniseries. For the season, Metzner also wanted to explore more of the mythology of K'un-Lun than was shown in the first season by spending more time there. Each episode is named after the issue title of various comics Danny Rand has appeared in, after the first season named each episode after Shaolin kung fu sequences.

When asked how the season would be influenced by the criticisms of the first, Metzner said that Marvel had allowed him to tell his own story rather than follow on from the first season and so he just approached the project as a fan of the comics and characters. He described the second season as an "evolution" of the first. Jones felt that Rand would be more relatable for the audience in the second season after moving in with his girlfriend and spending less time around Rand Enterprises. Metzner described this approach as "holistic", wanting the series to feel like being on the streets of New York. There were also discussions about including Moon Knight, who Metzner admitted to being a big fan of.

=== Casting ===
Finn Jones, Jessica Henwick, Tom Pelphrey, Jessica Stroup, and Sacha Dhawan reprise their roles as Danny Rand / Iron Fist, Colleen Wing, Ward Meachum, Joy Meachum, and Davos, respectively. They are joined in the season by Alice Eve as Mary Walker. Metzner had previously written a different version of Typhoid Mary for the film Elektra (2005), and was always interested in that character and well-versed in her comic story. Eve described her introduction in the season as an origin story that explores the mystery of the character's multiple personalities, while Loeb said, "We meet her at a certain point in her life and then cards get tipped over as you go."

With the announcement of the season, it was revealed that Simone Missick would appear, reprising her role as Misty Knight from previous MCU Netflix series. This allowed for the exploration of the Daughters of the Dragon team that Wing and Knight form in the comics. James Chen had also joined the cast as Sam Chung, a role loosely based on the comics supporting character of the same name.

=== Design ===
Both Rand and Davos wear Iron Fist's signature yellow bandana-like mask during a flashback sequence depicting their training days in K'un-Lun.

=== Filming ===
Filming for the season was expected to begin "soon" after it was announced at San Diego Comic-Con, with actor Sacha Dhawan saying then that "they're hopefully starting" by December 2017. By December 13, filming on the season had begun, in New York City where the production wrapped on May 10, 2018. Jones described this as the end of a "long and physical 7 month winter shoot". Extensive filming took place in New York's Chinatown. Niels Alpert served as cinematographer for the season.

Clayton Barber took over as the fight coordinator for the season, having also served in the role on Marvel's Black Panther (2018), after the fight choreography of the first season was widely criticized. Barber was inspired by "old school kung fu" such as the works of Jackie Chan, and wanted to make the fights of the series feel like "a punk rock song". Metzner noted that Jones had months of lead time before work on the season began to "hone his skills" with the fighting and stunts, and said that he and the rest of the cast along with Barber "really pushed themselves" with the fight sequences in the season. Jones added that all of the fight scenes have "an emotional standpoint" so that they drive the story forward rather than simply being "awesome fight scenes" for the sake of having fights.

=== Music ===
Robert Lydecker composed the music for the season.

=== Marvel Cinematic Universe tie-ins ===
The fictional country of Sokovia that was introduced in the MCU film Avengers: Age of Ultron (2015) is referenced in the season as part of Walker's past as an operative in the country.

== Marketing ==
Jones, Henwick, Missick, Eve, Loeb, Metzner, and Barber promoted the season at San Diego Comic-Con in 2018. Charles Pulliam-Moore of io9 felt the footage shown at the panel left him optimistic for the season, since "It finally feels like Iron Fist may have figured out what people wanted out of this show in the first place." He felt the clips showed "how drastic an improvement" there was to the fight choreography, thanks in part to new fight coordinator Barber joining the series. One clip that showed Rand facing Davos in K'un-Lun felt "brutal and bloody" while also being "fluid and elegant in a way that feels fresh, new, and exactly like what you want from Iron Fist." At the panel, Loeb appeared in a karate costume, as part of a comedic bit with Henwick, who later appeared on stage telling Loeb to remove the outfit. Some criticized the outfit as insensitive and "several layers of bad".

== Release ==
The second season of Iron Fist, consisting of ten episodes, was released on September 7, 2018, on the streaming service Netflix worldwide, in Ultra HD 4K and high dynamic range. The season, along with the additional Iron Fist season and the other Marvel Netflix series, was removed from Netflix on March 1, 2022, due to Netflix's license for the series ending and Disney regaining the rights. The season became available on Disney+ in the United States, Canada, United Kingdom, Ireland, Australia, and New Zealand on March 16, ahead of its debut in Disney+'s other markets by the end of 2022.

== Reception ==
=== Critical response ===
The review aggregation website Rotten Tomatoes reported a 55% approval rating, based on 47 reviews, with an average rating of 5.70/10. The website's critical consensus reads, "Better action scenes and tighter pacing elevate Iron Fist's second season, but it remains a lesser light among MCU shows." Metacritic assigned a score of 39 out of 100 based on reviews from six critics, indicating "generally unfavorable" reviews.

=== Accolades ===
The season received a nomination for Best Original Score TV Spot/Trailer/Teaser for a Series at the 2019 Golden Trailer Awards.
