= Simone Missick =

American actress (born 1982)

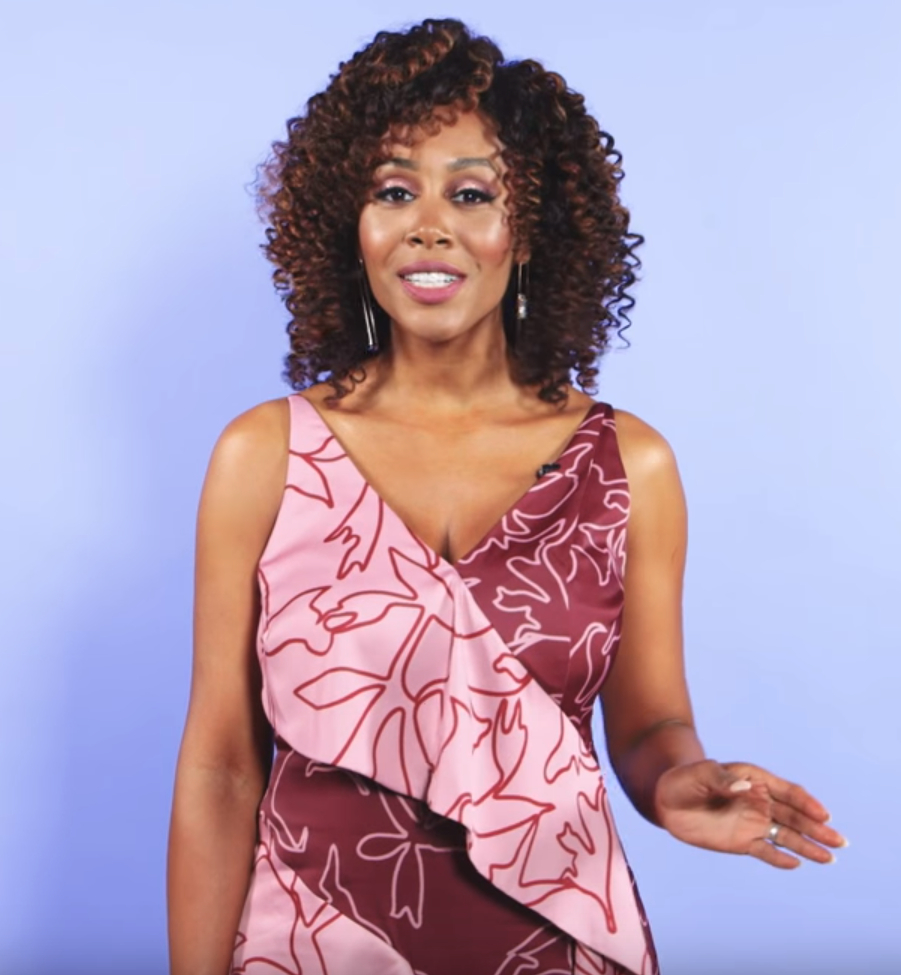
- Missick in 2018
- Born: Simone Cook; January 19, 1982 (age 44); Detroit, Michigan, U.S.
- Occupation: Actress
- Years active: 2003–present
- Spouse: Dorian Missick (m. 2012)

Simone Missick (née Cook; born January 19, 1982) is an American film and television actress. She is best known for her role in the Marvel Cinematic Universe as Detective Misty Knight in Luke Cage (2016–2018), a role she also plays in The Defenders (2017) and Iron Fist (2018). From 2019 to 2023, she starred as Lola Carmichael in All Rise.

== Early life ==
Simone Missick graduated from Renaissance High School in Detroit, Michigan, then in 2003 completed a bachelor degree in English and theatre arts at Howard University. Missick pursued acting after graduation.

== Career ==
Missick took master classes at British American Drama Academy in England. There she studied under Ben Kingsley, Alan Rickman, and Jane Lapotaire.

In 2008, Missick was featured in female leading role of Reese Knight in the independent feature The Road to Sundance.

In 2012, Missick played the role of Elise in the television film A Taste of Romance.

In 2014, Missick appeared in the series Ray Donovan as Porschla.

In 2016, Missick had her breakout role on Luke Cage as Misty Knight. Missick reprised the role in The Defenders and in the second season of Iron Fist.

In February 2019, it was announced that Missick was cast in the main role of Trepp for the second season of the Netflix science-fiction series Altered Carbon.

In May 2019, it was announced that Missick was cast in a lead role as Judge Lola Carmichael, a Los Angeles County Superior Court judge for the CBS drama series All Rise.

== Personal life ==
Missick married actor Dorian Missick in February 2012. He starred alongside her in the second season of Luke Cage as Dontrell "Cockroach" Hamilton.

== Filmography ==
=== Film ===
Year	Title	Role	Notes
2003	The Epicureans	Jamie	as Simone Cook
2008	The Road to Sundance	Reese Knight	as Simone Cook
2009	K-Town	Newly Single Lady #1	as Simone Cook
2009	Brotherlee	Tamar	Short film, as Simone Cook
2011	Look Again	Anna	Short film, as Simone Cook
2012	Voicemail	Wendy Peters	Short film
2013	Douglass U	Tasha, as Simone Cook	
2015	Black Card	Lona	Short film
2016	The Big Chop	Kris (adult)	Short film
2018	Jinn	Jade	Also executive producer
2019	#Truth	Lanie Cooper	

=== Television ===
Year	Title	Role	Notes
2011	Bucket & Skinner's Epic Adventures	Reporter	Episode: "Epic Babysitters" (as Simone Cook)
2012	A Taste of Romance	Elise	TV movie (as Simone Cook)
2014	Ray Donovan	Porschla	Episode: "Yo Soy Capitan"
2014	Everything I Did Wrong In My 20s	Melanie	Episode: "The Baby Moment"
2015	Scandal	Uniform Cop	Episode: "Heavy Is the Head"
2016	Wayward Pines	CJ's wife	Episode: "Time Will Tell" & "Bedtime Story"
2016–18	Luke Cage	Mercedes "Misty" Knight	Main cast; 26 episodes
2017	American Koko	Grace	Recurring cast; 4 episodes
2017	The Defenders	Mercedes "Misty" Knight	Main cast, miniseries; 5 episodes
2018	Iron Fist	Mercedes "Misty" Knight	Main cast, season 2; 6 episodes
2018–19	Tell Me a Story	Mariana Reynolds	2 episodes
2019	Relics and Rarities	Zora Ujasiri	Episode: "The Battle of Livingstone Caverns"
2019–23	All Rise	Judge Lola Carmichael	Main cast; 58 episodes
2020	Altered Carbon	Trepp	Main cast, season 2; 8 episodes
2025	Government Cheese	Astoria Chambers	Main cast; 9 episodes

== Awards and nominations ==
Association	Year	Work	Category	Result	Ref.
Black Reel Awards	2018	The Defenders	Outstanding Supporting Actress, TV Movie/limited series	Nominated	
Black Reel Awards	2019	Jinn	Outstanding Supporting Actress, Motion Picture	Nominated	
Black Reel Awards	2020	Altered Carbon	Outstanding Supporting Actress, Drama Series	Nominated	
Black Reel Awards	2020	All Rise	Outstanding Actress, Drama Series	Nominated	
NAACP Image Awards	2020	All Rise	Outstanding Actress in a Drama Series	Nominated	
NAACP Image Awards	2021	All Rise	Outstanding Actress in a Drama Series	Nominated	
Screen Actors Guild Award	2017	Luke Cage	Outstanding Performance by a Stunt Ensemble in a Television Series	Nominated	
