= Out of Sight (TV series) =

British children's television series

Out of Sight was a British children's television programme airing on CITV between 7 November 1996 and 10 December 1998. The series ran for 3 seasons and 27 episodes and made by Central Independent Television. It was written by Richard Carpenter and directed by David Cobham.

== Story ==
The 12-year-old boy genius Joseph (Joe) Lucas discovers an experiment in an old diary and a copy of The Invisible Man by H. G. Wells. With the help of a friend (Ali Pantajali) he recreates the experiment and makes a substance to turn people and things invisible by simply spraying it with the trademark green-bottled solution. The effects are reverted, whether intentionally or not, by the application of water or by waiting for a couple of minutes. Joe decides not to tell anybody except Ali of his invention. This is the reason for some strange moments for Joe and his family.

== Cast ==
- Shane Fox as Joe Lucas
- Moira Brooker as Mrs. Lucas
- Simon Pearsall as Jim Lucas
- Tom Aldwinckle as Shane Lucas
- Akabar Karim as Ali Pantajali (season 1)
- Sacha Dhawan as Ali Pantajali (season 2 and 3)
