= Welcome to India (TV series) =

British documentary television series

- Genre: Documentary
- Narrated by: Sacha Dhawan
- No. of seasons: 1
- No. of episodes: 3

Original release
- Release: October 3 – October 17, 2012

Welcome to India, is a British documentary television miniseries about India, narrated by Sacha Dhawan. The series first aired on BBC Two from 3 to 17 October 2012. The three part series follows people in Kolkata and Mumbai as they try to make a living through informal activities such as panning for gold or selling illegal alcohol.

The show first aired in Australia on 2 January 2013 on the network SBS One.

== Reception ==
The Daily Telegraph and The West Australian both criticized the show's narration. The Independent also criticized the narration as having "discomfiting cheerfulness".
