= M. Raven Metzner =

American screenwriter and producer

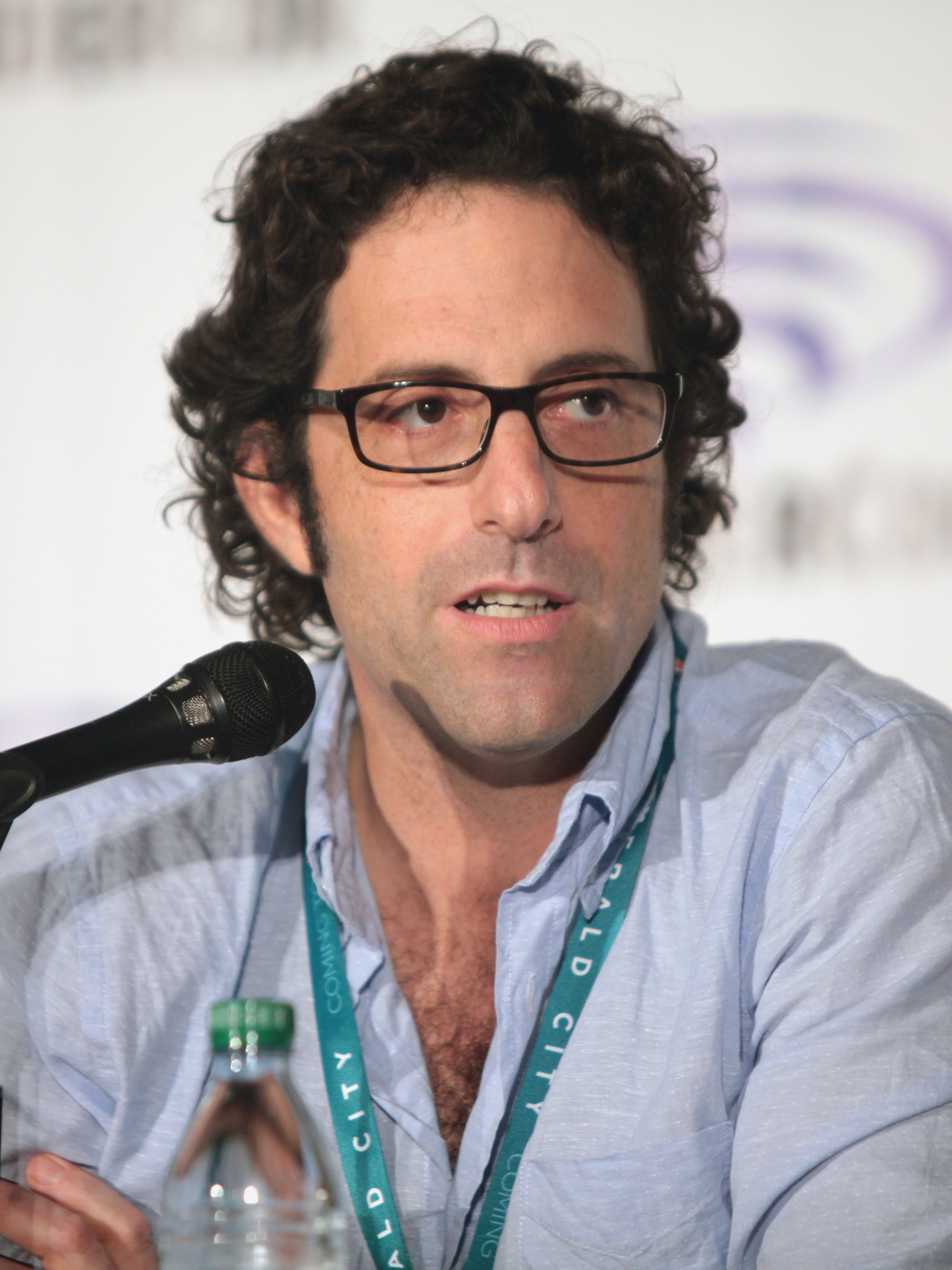
- Metzner at WonderCon 2016
- Born: New York City, New York
- Occupations: Writer, Producer
- Years active: 2005–present
- Spouse: Catherine Nicora
- Children: 2

M. Raven Metzner is an American screenwriter and producer.

== Career ==
Metzner started his career in 2005 with the movie Elektra before moving on to television projects such as Clue, Falling Skies and Sleepy Hollow. Metzner later replaced Scott Buck as the showrunner for Iron Fist starting with season 2.

In 2022, it was announced that he was one of the producer of upcoming medical drama East/West.

== Personal life ==
Metzner is married to Catherine Nicora. He has a son named Orion from a former relationship. On April 11, 2017, Metzner and Nicora had a daughter named Penelope Midnight.

== Filmography ==
=== Film ===
Year	Title	Writer	Producer	Notes
2005	Elektra	Yes	No	Feature film
2012	Daybreak 2012	Yes	Yes	TV movie
2017	Dinner Party	Yes	Yes	Short film

=== Television ===
Year	Title	Writer	Producer	Showrunner	Notes
2006	What About Brian	Yes	Yes	No	
2006-2007	Six Degrees	Yes	Yes	Yes	
2007-2008	Life Is Wild	Yes	Yes	No	
2011	Clue	Yes	Yes	Yes	
2014	Falling Skies	Yes	Yes	No	Season 4 only
2014-2017	Sleepy Hollow	Yes	Yes	No	Starting with season 2
2015	Heroes Reborn	Yes	Yes	No	
2018	Iron Fist	Yes	Yes	Yes	Season 2
2024	Star Trek: Discovery	Yes	Yes	No	Season 5 only
TBD	East/West	?	Yes	?	Pre-production
TBD	Dinner Party	?	Yes	?	Pre-production
