= Iron Fist (TV series) =

2017–2018 Marvel Television series

- Genre: Action-adventure; Drama; Fantasy; Martial arts; Superhero
- Created by: Scott Buck
- Based on: Iron Fist by: Roy Thomas; Gil Kane
- Showrunners: Scott Buck; M. Raven Metzner
- Starring: Finn Jones; Jessica Henwick; Tom Pelphrey; Jessica Stroup; Ramón Rodríguez; Sacha Dhawan; Rosario Dawson; David Wenham; Simone Missick; Alice Eve
- Theme music composer: Trevor Morris
- Composers: Trevor Morris; Robert Lydecker
- Country of origin: United States
- Original language: English
- No. of seasons: 2
- No. of episodes: 23

Production
- Executive producers: John Dahl; Cindy Holland; Allie Goss; Alison Engel; Kris Henigman; Alan Fine; Stan Lee; Joe Quesada; Dan Buckley; Jim Chory; Jeph Loeb; Scott Buck; Karim Zreik; David Dobkin; M. Raven Metzner
- Producer: Evan Perazzo
- Production location: New York City
- Cinematography: Manuel Billeter; Christopher LaVasseur; Niels Alpert
- Editors: Michael N. Knue; Miklos Wright; Jonathan Chibnall; Andrew Coutts; Tim Brinker
- Running time: 49–61 minutes
- Production companies: Marvel Television; ABC Studios; Devilina Productions

Original release
- Network: Netflix
- Release: March 17, 2017 – September 7, 2018

Related
- Marvel's Netflix television series

Marvel's Iron Fist is an American television series created by Scott Buck for the streaming service Netflix, based on the Marvel Comics character Iron Fist. It is set in the Marvel Cinematic Universe (MCU), sharing continuity with the franchise's films, and was the fourth Marvel Netflix series leading to the crossover miniseries The Defenders (2017). The series was produced by Marvel Television in association with ABC Studios, with Devilina Productions also producing in the first season. Buck served as showrunner for the first season; Raven Metzner took over for the second.

Finn Jones stars as Danny Rand / Iron Fist, a martial arts expert with the ability to call upon a mystical power known as the Iron Fist. Jessica Henwick, Tom Pelphrey, Jessica Stroup, and Sacha Dhawan also star, with Ramón Rodríguez, Rosario Dawson and David Wenham joining them for the first season, and Simone Missick and Alice Eve joining for season two. After a film based on Iron Fist was in the works at Marvel Studios for over a decade, development for the series began in late 2013 at Marvel Television with inspiration taken from martial arts films. Buck was hired as showrunner in December 2015, Jones was cast as Rand in February 2016, and Brett Chan served as the stunt coordinator for the first season. Metzner was revealed to be showrunning the second season in July 2017, with Clayton Barber taking over as the fight coordinator. Filming took place in New York City.

The first, 13-episode season was released in its entirety on Netflix on March 17, 2017. It received generally negative reviews from critics, but third-party data analytics determined that the series had strong viewership. A second, 10-episode season was released on September 7, 2018, to mixed but improved reviews. Netflix cancelled Iron Fist on October 12, 2018. All of the Marvel Netflix series were removed from Netflix on March 1, 2022, after Disney regained the license for them. They began streaming on Disney+ from March 16. Jones will reprise his role in the third season of the Marvel Studios Disney+ series Daredevil: Born Again in 2027.

== Premise ==
In the first season, after being presumed dead for 15 years, Danny Rand returns to New York City to reclaim his family's company, Rand Enterprises, from Harold Meachum and his children Ward and Joy. When a threat emerges, Rand must choose between his family's legacy and his duties as the Iron Fist. In the second season, after the events of The Defenders (2017), Rand steps up to protect New York in Matt Murdock's absence, until a new enemy threatens Rand's identity and those he cares about.

== Cast and characters ==
- Finn Jones as Danny Rand / Iron Fist:
  A billionaire Buddhist monk and martial artist, master of kung-fu, with the ability to call upon the mystical power of the Iron Fist. Jones described the character as "someone struggling to find his identity". He identifies with the character's loneliness because he, too, is an orphan. He noted that "Danny gets really stressed and really pissed off sometimes, and I understand that ... [his] optimism and where that comes from." In preparation for the role, Jones studied kung fu, wushu, and tai chi, along with weight training, Buddhist philosophy, and meditation. Toby Nichols portrays a young Danny Rand.
- Jessica Henwick as Colleen Wing:
  An ally of Rand, a martial artist who runs her own dojo, Chikara Dojo, in New York City. Henwick felt the word that defined Wing most was "alone", saying, "She doesn't want to be anyone's love interest and open herself up in that way." In her portrayal, Henwick also tried "to pull out that sort of very dry humor that [Wing] has, and that no-bullshit New-Yorker demeanor" from the comics' version of the character.
- Tom Pelphrey as Ward Meachum:
  The son of Harold Meachum, a childhood acquaintance of Rand. His work building up Rand Enterprises with his sister Joy is threatened by Rand's return. Although Ward is a character from the comics, Pelphrey noted "we're not necessarily beholden to representing him [in the series] exactly as he appears in the comic book." Stroup said that Ward would experience some "male angst" on Rand's return, because "Ward would have been the one who picked on [Rand] when he was little, so as pure and innocent and great as Iron Fist is, he comes in and he causes some problems" there. Ilan Eskenazi portrays a teenage Ward Meachum.
- Jessica Stroup as Joy Meachum:
  The daughter of Harold Meachum, a childhood acquaintance of Rand. Her work building up Rand Enterprises with her brother Ward is threatened by Rand's return. Stroup said that Joy "absolutely loves" Rand, and his return to New York is "like this rebirth of what she once was, and she gets to ask these questions about herself because he's posing them to her." Stroup said that Joy would initially be unsure whether Rand is who he says he is. Aimee Laurence portrays a young Joy Meachum.
- Ramón Rodríguez as Bakuto: A leader of a faction of the Hand and Colleen Wing's sensei.
- Sacha Dhawan as Davos:
  A skilled martial artist who is the son of Lei Kung. Rand's former best friend in K'un-Lun, Davos grew envious when Rand became the Iron Fist. Dhawan first appeared in the ninth episode of the first season; he noted that the majority of Davos' storyline would be explored in a potential second season.
- Rosario Dawson as Claire Temple: A former nurse from Hell's Kitchen who joins Wing's dojo. Dawson reprises her role from other Marvel Netflix series.
- David Wenham as Harold Meachum:
  A ruthless corporate leader, co-founder of Rand Enterprises. He was partners with Rand's parents at the time of their deaths. Regarding Harold's relationship with his children, Joy and Ward, Wenham said the dynamic between the three of them "is complex, to say the least. It's multilayered, it's multidimensional, it's surprising, and it's forever changing, depending on the circumstances."
- Simone Missick as Misty Knight: A Harlem NYPD Detective with a strong sense of justice, an ally of Rand and Wing. Missick reprises her role from other Marvel Netflix series.
- Alice Eve as Mary Walker: A mysterious woman with hidden abilities.

== Episodes ==
Season	Episodes	Originally released
1	13	March 17, 2017
2	10	September 7, 2018

=== Season 1 (2017) ===
No. overall	No. in season	Title (Note: Each episode is named after Shaolin kung fu sequences.)	Directed by	Written by	Original release date
1	1	"Snow Gives Way"	John Dahl	Scott Buck	March 17, 2017
2	2	"Shadow Hawk Takes Flight"	John Dahl	Scott Buck	March 17, 2017
3	3	"Rolling Thunder Cannon Punch"	Tom Shankland	Quinton Peeples	March 17, 2017
4	4	"Eight Diagram Dragon Palm"	Miguel Sapochnik	Scott Reynolds	March 17, 2017
5	5	"Under Leaf Pluck Lotus"	Uta Briesewitz	Cristine Chambers	March 17, 2017
6	6	"Immortal Emerges from Cave"	RZA	Dwain Worrell	March 17, 2017
7	7	"Felling Tree with Roots"	Farren Blackburn	Ian Stokes	March 17, 2017
8	8	"The Blessing of Many Fractures"	Kevin Tancharoen	Tamara Becher-Wilkinson	March 17, 2017
9	9	"The Mistress of All Agonies"	Jet Wilkinson	Pat Charles	March 17, 2017
10	10	"Black Tiger Steals Heart"	Peter Hoar	Quinton Peeples	March 17, 2017
11	11	"Lead Horse Back to Stable"	Deborah Chow	Ian Stokes	March 17, 2017
12	12	"Bar the Big Boss"	Andy Goddard	Scott Reynolds	March 17, 2017
13	13	"Dragon Plays with Fire"	Stephen Surjik	Scott Buck & Tamara Becher-Wilkinson & Pat Charles	March 17, 2017

=== Season 2 (2018) ===
No. overall	No. in season	Title (Note: Each episode is named after the issue title of various comics Danny Rand has appeared in.)	Directed by	Written by	Original release date
14	1	"The Fury of Iron Fist"	David Dobkin	M. Raven Metzner	September 7, 2018
15	2	"The City's Not for Burning"	Rachel Talalay	Jon Worley	September 7, 2018
16	3	"This Deadly Secret..."	Toa Fraser	Tatiana Suarez-Pico	September 7, 2018
17	4	"Target: Iron Fist"	M. J. Bassett	Jenny Lynn	September 7, 2018
18	5	"Heart of the Dragon"	Mairzee Almas	Declan de Barra	September 7, 2018
19	6	"The Dragon Dies at Dawn"	Philip John	Matthew White	September 7, 2018
20	7	"Morning of the Mindstorm"	Stephen Surjik	Rebecca Dameron	September 7, 2018
21	8	"Citadel on the Edge of Vengeance"	Julian Holmes	Melissa Glenn	September 7, 2018
22	9	"War Without End"	Sanford Bookstaver	Daniel Shattuck	September 7, 2018
23	10	"A Duel of Iron"	Jonas Pate	M. Raven Metzner	September 7, 2018

== Production ==
=== Development ===
An Iron Fist film had been in development at Marvel Studios since 2000, originally to be cofinanced by Artisan Entertainment. Ray Park was hired to star, but the project went through multiple directors and ultimately did not come to fruition. Development continued after Marvel Studios began to self-finance their films in the middle of the decade, with Marvel hiring a group of writers to develop some of their "lesser-known properties", including Iron Fist. In 2010, Rich Wilkes was hired to write a new draft for the film, and by May 2013, Iron Fist was said to be one of the "projects on the horizon" for Marvel.

In October 2013, Deadline Hollywood reported that Marvel Television was preparing four drama series and a miniseries, totaling 60 episodes, to present to video on demand services and cable providers, with Netflix, Amazon, and WGN America expressing interest. A few weeks later, Marvel and Disney announced that Marvel Television and ABC Studios would provide Netflix with live action series centered around Iron Fist, Daredevil, Jessica Jones, and Luke Cage, leading up to a miniseries based on the Defenders. In April 2015, the official title was revealed to be Marvel's Iron Fist. That November, Marvel Television head and executive producer Jeph Loeb addressed unconfirmed rumors that Marvel was having a difficult time balancing Iron Fist's mystical elements in its grounded world, and that the series could be replaced with a film or a Punisher series. He explained that Marvel and Netflix deliberately held off on Iron Fist news until Marvel's Jessica Jones premiered so that series, revolving around a character largely unknown to the general audience, got the spotlight. Loeb promised that news on a showrunner would be coming, and Marvel announced that Scott Buck would serve in the role a month later. The series was originally intended to be the third of the announced series from Netflix, debuting after Jessica Jones, but was switched with Marvel's Luke Cage after Luke Cage became a breakout star of Jessica Jones and Marvel wanted to "follow the momentum". John Dahl, Cindy Holland, Allie Goss, Alison Engel, Kris Henigman, Alan Fine, Stan Lee, Joe Quesada, Dan Buckley, Jim Chory, Loeb and Buck serve as executive producers on the series. A second season was announced in July 2017, with Raven Metzner announced as the new showrunner for the season, replacing Buck. Loeb felt Metzner's "love of all things Iron Fist and his extensive knowledge of martial arts films made him the perfect choice" for new showrunner.

=== Writing ===
Buck stated the series would have a lighter tone to it than the previous Marvel Netflix series, given that "Danny Rand himself is a much lighter character. He's someone that has optimism and hope, and despite whatever the odds are, everything is always going to work out." On first discovering Rand's powers, Buck described them as "not the greatest superpowers. All he can do is punch really hard ... you can use it in some ways but in rest of his life, it's not really all that significant. His greatest gift is his martial arts skills, and that's something he suffered and worked for." The writers and producers approached "scientists to discuss how someone could potentially have that type of super strength in the real world." Loeb described the series as "Marvel's foray into martial arts films", and Buck stated that the comics were just "a starting-off point" for the series, which would be "very grounded [and] character driven". Jones felt the series was "actually a feminist television show" calling the female characters "incredibly strong, incredibly unique, and they really hold the men up in that world... All the men in our show are falling apart. They need these women to hold them up".

Each episode of the first season is named after Shaolin Kung Fu sequences, while each episode title in the second season is named after the issue title of various comics Danny Rand has appeared in.

=== Casting ===
Casting for Iron Fist began by November 2015, with Finn Jones being cast as Danny Rand / Iron Fist in February 2016, but not officially confirmed by Marvel until March. On casting Jones, Buck said, "we saw him and I think we all just knew immediately this is our guy... He just seemed to be able to display [the character's youthful optimism and badass attitude] when needed and sometimes all at once, so he was very capable and flexible as he brought the character to life." By April, Jessica Henwick, David Wenham, Jessica Stroup and Tom Pelphrey were cast as Colleen Wing, Harold Meachum, Joy Meachum, and Ward Meachum, respectively, and by June, Sacha Dhawan had been cast as Davos, though he was not revealed to be in the role until March 2017. In October 2016, it was revealed that Rosario Dawson would reprise her role of Claire Temple from previous Marvel/Netflix series. Ramón Rodríguez also stars as Bakuto.

Jones, Henwick, Pelphrey, Stroup, and Dhawan reprise their roles in the second season. They are joined by Simone Missick as Misty Knight, reprising her role from previous Marvel Netflix series, and Alice Eve as Mary Walker.

=== Design ===
Stephanie Maslansky is the costume designer for Iron Fist, after serving the same role for the previous Marvel Netflix series. Maslansky noted one of the differences in the series compared to the other Marvel Netflix series was the neighborhoods it spent time in ("the wealthier neighborhoods; Midtown, Upper East Side, that sort of thing") compared to Hell's Kitchen for Daredevil and Jessica Jones and Harlem for Luke Cage. As such, Rand wears more suits than the other heroes, and given the amount of fighting he does in the series, a good amount of spandex was added to increase the suits' flexibility. The monk costumes and Rand's warrior costume was based on "real Shaolin warrior monk costumes... I took that distinctive silhouette from the Shaolin warrior monk clothing, and we combined it with the traditional colors of the Iron Fist, green and gold." The series opening title sequence was created by Elastic.

=== Filming ===
Filming for the series takes place in New York City, in addition to sound stage work. Manuel Billeter served as director of photography for the first season, after doing the same for seasons of Jessica Jones and Luke Cage, and Brett Chan was the series' stunt-coordinator and second unit director in the first season. The first season was filmed in high dynamic range (HDR), which Billeter stated added "a learning curve" to his work, forcing him to rethink how he would shoot certain scenes. For the second season, Niels Alpert served as director of photography, while Clayton Barber took over as the fight coordinator.

=== Music ===
In late October 2016, Trevor Morris was revealed to be composing the music for the first season. A soundtrack album featuring Morris's score for the first season was released by Marvel digitally on March 17, 2017, coinciding with the release of the season. Robert Lydecker composed the score for the second season.

=== Marvel Cinematic Universe tie-ins ===
Iron Fist is the fourth of the ordered Netflix series, after Marvel's Daredevil, Jessica Jones and Luke Cage, which lead to the miniseries The Defenders. In November 2013, Disney CEO Bob Iger stated that if the characters prove popular on Netflix, "It's quite possible that they could become feature films," which Sarandos echoed in July 2015. In August 2014, Vincent D'Onofrio, Wilson Fisk in Daredevil, stated that after the "series stuff with Netflix", Marvel has "a bigger plan to branch out". In March 2015, Loeb spoke on the ability for the series to crossover with the MCU films and the ABC television series, saying, "It all exists in the same universe. As it is now, in the same way that our films started out as self-contained and then by the time we got to The Avengers, it became more practical for Captain America to do a little crossover into Thor 2 and for Bruce Banner to appear at the end of Iron Man 3. We have to earn that. The audience needs to understand who all of these characters are and what the world is before you then start co-mingling in terms of where it's going."

== Marketing ==
Disney Consumer Products created a small line of products to cater to a more adult audience given the show's edgier tone. Paul Gitter, senior VP of Marvel Licensing for Disney Consumer Products, explained the marketing focus would be more on older teens and adults than youth, with products at outlets like Hot Topic. Additionally, a Marvel Knights merchandise program was created to support the series, which creates new opportunities for individual product lines and collector-focused products. Licensing partners wanted to pair up with Marvel, despite this not being a film, given its previous successes.

== Release ==
=== Streaming ===
Iron Fist was released on the streaming service Netflix, in all territories where it is available, in Ultra HD 4K and HDR. The episodes for each season were released simultaneously, as opposed to a serialized format, to encourage binge-watching, a format that has been successful for other Netflix original series. Despite being branded as a "Netflix Original", Iron Fist was licensed to Netflix from Disney.

Iron Fist was removed from Netflix on March 1, 2022, along with the other Marvel Netflix series, due to Netflix's license for the series ending and Disney regaining the rights. Disney opted not to have Netflix pay a large licensing fee to retain the distribution rights for the series, and instead announced that all the series would be made available on Disney+ on March 16 in the United States, Canada, United Kingdom, Ireland, Australia, and New Zealand, and in Disney+'s other markets by the end of 2022. In the United States, revised parental controls were introduced to the service to allow the more mature content of the series to be added, similarly to the controls that already exist for other regions that have the Star content hub.

=== Home media ===
Season	DVD release dates			Blu-ray release dates	
Season	Region 1	Region 2	Region 4	Region A	Region B
1	—N/a	June 4, 2018	May 30, 2018	January 1, 2018	May 30, 2018
2	—N/a	—N/a	—N/a	—N/a	—N/a

== Reception ==
=== Audience viewership ===
As Netflix does not reveal subscriber viewership numbers for any of their original series, Karim Zreik, senior vice president of original programming at Marvel Television, provided some viewership demographics for Iron Fist in August 2017, noting that the series has attracted mainly younger viewers. Also in the month, Netflix released viewing patterns for the Marvel Netflix series. The data, which came from Netflix's "1,300 'taste communities' around the world, where subscribers are grouped based on what they watch", showed that viewers would not watch the series in chronological order by release, rather starting with Jessica Jones, then Daredevil, Luke Cage and finally Iron Fist. Todd Yellin, Netflix's vice president of product innovation, noted that audiences watch the series "in order of how they're interested in them and how they learn about them." Netflix's data also showed that a viewer watching Luke Cage would most often then move on to Iron Fist, while other series with "coming-of-tales" such as 13 Reasons Why, Love and The 100 led viewers to starting Iron Fist. In October 2018, Crimson Hexagon, a consumer insights company, released data that examined the "social-media buzz" for the series to try to correlate it with potential viewership. The data showed that when the first season premiered in March 2017, the season had over 120,000 Twitter and Instagram posts regarding it, and when the second season was released in September 2018, the posts had declined dramatically to under 20,000.

=== Critical response ===
Critical response of Iron Fist
Season	Rotten Tomatoes	Metacritic
1	20% (85 reviews)	37 (21 reviews)
2	56% (48 reviews)	39 (6 reviews)

The review aggregation website Rotten Tomatoes reported the first season has a 20% approval rating, based on 86 reviews, with an average rating of 4.2/10. The website's critical consensus reads, "Despite some promising moments, Iron Fist is weighed down by an absence of momentum and originality." Metacritic, which uses a weighted average, assigned a score of 37 out of 100 based on reviews from 21 critics, indicating "generally unfavorable reviews".

For the second season Rotten Tomatoes reported a 55% approval rating, based on 48 reviews, with an average rating of 5.7/10. The website's critical consensus reads, "Better action scenes and tighter pacing elevate Iron Fist's second season, but it remains a lesser light among MCU shows." On September 7, 2018, Rotten Tomatoes announced that Iron Fist had the largest increase in approval ratings between the first and second season, increasing 33% at the time. Metacritic assigned a score of 39 out of 100 based on reviews from six critics, indicating "generally unfavorable reviews".

=== Accolades ===
Iron Fist was nominated in the category of Best New Media Superhero Series at the 44th Saturn Awards. The series received a nomination for Best Original Score TV Spot/Trailer/Teaser for a Series at the 2019 Golden Trailer Awards.

== Cancellation and future ==
On October 12, 2018, Netflix canceled the series, despite Marvel wanting to have the series continue on the platform. Marvel said the characters from the series would "live on" despite the cancellation, and continue to appear in the MCU. Deadline Hollywood also reported that Disney was considering reviving the series on its streaming service, Disney+. However, Variety reported that, per the original deal between Marvel and Netflix for the series, the characters cannot appear in any non-Netflix series or films for at least two years following the cancellation of Iron Fist. Kevin A. Mayer, chairman of Walt Disney Direct-to-Consumer and International, noted that, while it had not yet been discussed, it was a possibility that Disney+ could revive the series. In February 2019, Hulu's senior vice president of originals Craig Erwich said that the streaming service was open to reviving the series, along with the other former Netflix series.

Jones and Metzner had both believed a third season would be ordered and had planned the storyline for it, with Jones feeling the season had promise. Jones said it would have featured Rand and Meachum traveling the world in a buddy story, with Rand "fully charged up (and) fully in control", and finally assuming the role of Iron Fist. Wing, remaining in New York, would have been struggling to come to terms with her identity and newfound power before reuniting with Rand and becoming a couple. In December 2021, Henwick revealed that she was offered the role of Xialing in the Marvel Studios film Shang-Chi and the Legend of the Ten Rings (2021), but turned it down because she wanted to reprise the role of Wing in a future MCU production.

Ahead of Charlie Cox's appearance as Daredevil in Echo, which released in January 2024, Marvel Studios' head of streaming Brad Winderbaum acknowledged that Marvel Studios had previously been "a little bit cagey" about what was part of their Sacred Timeline, noting how there had been the corporate divide between what Marvel Studios created and what Marvel Television created. He continued that as time has passed, Marvel Studios has begun to see "how well integrated the [Marvel Television] stories are" and personally felt "confident" in saying Daredevil specifically was part of the Sacred Timeline. With Echo's release, all of the Netflix series were retroactively added to the MCU Disney+ timeline, with Iron Fist placed alongside the Phase Two content of the MCU, after Ant-Man (2015). An update to the Disney+ timeline split out the series by season, with Iron Fist's second season placed between Doctor Strange (2016) and Thor: Ragnarok (2017).

Jones will reprise his role in the third season of the Disney+ series Daredevil: Born Again (2027).
