= Sacha Dhawan =

English actor (born 1984)

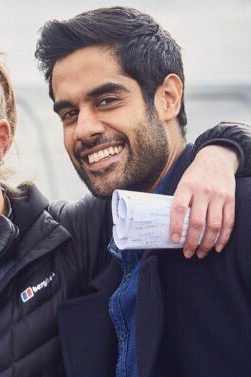
- Dhawan on the set of The Boy with the Topknot in 2016
- Born: 1 May 1984 (age 42); Bramhall, Stockport, England
- Occupation: Actor
- Years active: 1998–present
- Spouse: Anjli Mohindra (m. 2025)

Sacha Dhawan (/dəˈwɒn/) (born 1 May 1984) is a British actor. He began his career in the ITV series Out of Sight (1997–1998), The Last Train (1999), and Weirdsister College (2001–2002). He originated the role of Akthar in the play The History Boys (2004–2006) and reprised his role in its film adaptation (2006).

Dhawan has since played Paul Jatri in the BBC One comedy-drama Last Tango in Halifax (2012), Waris Hussein in the BBC Two docudrama An Adventure in Space and Time (2013), Davos in the Marvel series Iron Fist (2017–2018), Count Orlo in The Great (2020–2023) on Hulu, and The Master in the science fiction series Doctor Who (2020, 2022).

== Early life and education ==
Sacha Dhawan was born in 1984 in Bramhall, Stockport, to Indian parents from Jalandhar, Punjab, India.

Dhawan trained at the Laine-Johnson Theatre School in Manchester, and started acting at the age of twelve. He attended the Roman Catholic school Aquinas College in Stockport.

== Career ==
=== Television and film ===
Dhawan has appeared in a number of television shows in the United Kingdom. He had recurring roles in Weirdsister College, in which he played Azmat Madaridi, and series two and three of the children's TV series Out of Sight. He appeared in the miniseries The Last Train (1999), and has guest starred in episodes on EastEnders, Altogether Now, and City Central. He also appeared in 2008 ITV drama, Wired, as Ben Chandrakar, alongside Jodie Whittaker and Laurence Fox. He was part of an ensemble cast on the NBC sitcom Outsourced, which aired during the 2010–2011 season. In November 2013, Dhawan portrayed director Waris Hussein in An Adventure in Space and Time, a BBC Two biographical television film on the creation of the BBC science fiction television series Doctor Who as part of its 50th Anniversary celebration. He also appeared as Paul Jatri, a 22-year-old man involved with a woman twice his age, in the first series of BBC One's Last Tango in Halifax. He plays the part of Davos in the Netflix series Iron Fist in both the seasons. He starred as Sathnam Sanghera in the critically acclaimed The Boy with the Topknot, shown on BBC 2 in 2017. He appeared in four episodes of the twelfth series of Doctor Who as the latest incarnation of the renegade Time Lord known as the Master, acting opposite Jodie Whittaker as the Thirteenth Doctor. He reprised the role in the 2022 special The Power of the Doctor, Whittaker's last episode. From 2020 to 2023, he played the role of Count Orlo, advisor to Catherine the Great, in comedy-drama TV series The Great.

Dhawan was cast as the title character in the BBC crime drama Virdee, adapted from the novels by A A Dhand. He was later replaced in the role by Staz Nair.

=== Theatre ===
Dhawan originated the role of Akthar in Alan Bennett's play The History Boys. After playing Akthar in the original stage production he reprised the role in the Broadway, Sydney, Wellington and Hong Kong productions, and radio and film versions of the play.

In July 2018, Dhawan reunited with History Boys playwright Alan Bennett and co-star Samuel Barnett for Bennett's new play Allelujah! at the Bridge Theatre.

== Personal life ==
As of 2018, Dhawan was in a relationship with actress Anjli Mohindra. The couple became engaged during a trip to Machu Picchu in 2024. On 30 August 2025, they married in a Hindu ceremony in Tuscany.

== Filmography ==
=== Film ===
Year	Title	Role	Notes
2006	The History Boys	Akthar	
2010	Splintered	Sam	
2012	Girl Shaped Love Drug	Him	
2012	The Mystery of Edwin Drood	Neville Landless	Miniseries
2013	After Earth	Hesper Pilot	
2015	The Lady in the Van	Doctor at Gloucester Crescent	
2018	National Theatre Live: Allelujah!	Dr. Valentine	
2023	The Glassworker	Vincent Oliver	Voice

=== Television ===
Year	Title	Role	Notes
1997–1998	Out of Sight	Ali Pantajali	Main role; 20 episodes
1998	City Central	Tony	Episode: "Picking Up the Pieces"
1999	The Last Train	Leo Nixon	Main role; 6 episodes
2001–2002	Weirdsister College	Azmat Madari	Main role; 13 episodes
2003	EastEnders: Perfectly Frank	DC Wayne Atkins	TV movie
2006	Bradford Riots	Karim	TV movie
2008	Wired	Ben	3 episodes
2008–2021	Chuggington	Eddie	Voice (UK version)
2009	Paradox	Jaz Roy	Series 1, episode 4
2010	The Deep	Vincent	5 episodes
2010	Five Days	Khalil Akram	4 episodes
2010–2011	Outsourced	Manmeet	Main role; 22 episodes
2012	Last Tango in Halifax	Paul Jatri	6 episodes
2012	Being Human	Pete	Episode: "Hold the Front Page"
2012	Welcome to India	Narrator	TV documentary
2013	The Tractate Middoth	William Garrett	Television film
2013	An Adventure in Space and Time	Waris Hussein	Television film
2014	Utopia	Paul	2 episodes
2014	24: Live Another Day	Naveed Shabazz	4 episodes
2014	In the Flesh	Amir	Series 2, episode 3
2014	Line of Duty	Manish Prasad	3 episodes
2014	Mr Selfridge	Jimmy Dillon	Main role; 9 episodes
2014–2016	In the Club	Dev Sidhwa	Main role; 12 episodes
2015	No Offence	Majid Hassan	Series 1, episode 3
2015	Bugsplat!	Mohammed Mohammed	Television film
2015	Not Safe for Work	Danny	6 episodes
2015	The Interceptor	Astin Ray	Episode 3
2017	Sherlock	Ajay	Episode: "The Six Thatchers"
2017	The Boy with the Topknot	Sathnam Sanghera	BBC Two
2017–2018	Marvel's Iron Fist	Davos	Main role; 15 episodes
2020	Dracula	Dr. Sharma	1 episode
2020	Thunderbirds Are Go	Stew	Voice; episode: "Upside Down"
2020, 2022	Doctor Who	The Master	5 episodes
2020–2023	The Great	Count Orlo	Main role
2021	The Prince	Teddy / Dinesh	Voice; 12 episodes
2022	Suspect	Jaisal	8 episodes
2023	Wolf	Honey	6 episodes
2023	Summer Camp Island	Miracle Rabbit	Voice; episode: "Miracle Rabbit"
2025	The Iris Affair	Alfie Bird	4 episodes

=== Audio drama ===
Year	Title		Role	Notes
2014	Doctor Who: Dark Eyes 3	Episode: "The Reviled"	Jaldam / Vaughan	
2016	Doctor Who: Classic Doctors, New Monsters 1	Episode: "Fallen Angels"	Joel Finch	
2017	Torchwood: Aliens Among Us Part 2	Episode: "Zero Hour"	Hasan	
2018	Doctor Who: The Monthly Adventures	Episode: "Ghost Walk"	Matthew	
2021	First Action Bureau: Series 1		Benjamin Saal	
2025–present	Call Me Master	Inner Demons	The Master	
2025–present	Call Me Master	Monsters	The Master	
2025	Harry Potter: The Full-Cast Audio Editions	Harry Potter and the Philosopher's Stone	Quirinus Quirrell	

=== Video games ===
Year	Title	Role	Notes
2010	Gray Matter	Malik	Voice
2012	Warhammer Online: Wrath of Heroes	Durrig	Voice
2014	Game of Thrones: A Telltale Games Series	Gryff Whitehill	Voice
2017	Mass Effect: Andromeda	Additional voices	Voice
2017	Lego Marvel Super Heroes 2	Steel Serpent	Voice
2018	Dragon Quest XI: Echoes of an Elusive Age	Prince Faris, additional voices	Voice (English version)
2024	Dragon Age: The Veilguard	Elek Tavor	

=== Radio and theatre ===
Year	Title	Role	Notes
1998	Chocky	Matthew Gore	Radio play, BBC Radio 4
2001	East is East	Sajid	Live theatre, Haymarket Theatre, Leicester
2002	The Witches	Boy	Live theatre, Haymarket Theatre, Leicester
2004–2006	The History Boys	Akthar	Live theatre, Lyttelton Theatre, Royal National Theatre, London
2004–2006	The History Boys	Akthar	Live theatre, Broadhurst Theatre, Broadway
2004–2006	The History Boys	Akthar	Live theatre, Sydney Theatre, Sydney
2004–2006	The History Boys	Akthar	Live theatre, St. James Theatre, Wellington
2004–2006	The History Boys	Akthar	Live theatre, Lyric Theatre, Hong Kong Academy for Performing Arts, Hong Kong
2007	The Prospect	Hanif	Radio play, BBC Radio 4
2007	Pretend You Have Big Buildings	Danny	Live theatre, Royal Exchange Theatre, Manchester
2007	Borstal Boy		Live theatre, Edinburgh Festival Fringe
2008	Pornography		Live theatre, Traverse Theatre, Edinburgh
2009	England People Very Nice	Norfolk Danny/Carlo/Aaron/Mushi	Olivier Theatre, National Theatre
2018	Allelujah! by Alan Bennett	Dr. Valentine	Live theatre, Bridge Theatre
2022	Tom Clancy's Splinter Cell: Firewall by James Swallow	Charlie Cole	Radio drama, BBC Radio 4
