= Night Nurse (comics) =

Marvel Comics series

- Night Nurse #1 (Nov. 1972). Cover art by Win Mortimer.

Publication information
- Publisher: Marvel Comics
- Genre: Superhero
- Publication date: Nov. 1972 – May 1973

Creative team
- Created by: Jean Thomas; Win Mortimer
- Written by: Jean Thomas; Linda Fite (issue 4)
- Penciller: Win Mortimer
- Inker: Win Mortimer
- Colorist: George Roussos
- Editor: Roy Thomas

Night Nurse is a comic-book series published by Marvel Comics in the early 1970s. Linda Carter, one of the series' three central characters, previously was the lead of an earlier Marvel series, Linda Carter, Student Nurse, published in 1961. Other central characters included Georgia Jenkins and Christine Palmer; both Carter and Palmer would later be incorporated into the larger 616 Marvel Universe comics.

Carter later adopted the name Night Nurse for herself, and in this incarnation, first appeared in Daredevil #58 (May 2004), as a medical professional specializing in helping injured superheroes.

Dr. Strange: The Oath, by writer Brian K. Vaughan and artist Marcos Martín, is a 2007 five part limited series that co-starred Linda Carter as Night Nurse alongside Doctor Strange.

Christine Palmer appears in the Marvel Cinematic Universe films Doctor Strange (2016) and Doctor Strange in the Multiverse of Madness (2022), portrayed by Rachel McAdams. Additionally, McAdams voiced an alternate timeline version in the Disney+ animated series What If...? (2021). Elements of Linda Carter are incorporated into the character Claire Temple (portrayed by Rosario Dawson), who appeared in the Marvel's Netflix Daredevil series.

== Publication history ==
Night Nurse is a Marvel Comics title that lasted four issues (cover-dated Nov. 1972–May 1973). The medical drama/romance series focused on the adventures of three female roommates who worked the night shift at the fictional Metropolitan General Hospital in New York City: Linda Carter, Georgia Jenkins, and Christine Palmer.

Night Nurse was one of a trio of Marvel Comics of the time that were aimed at a female audience, alongside The Claws of the Cat and Shanna the She-Devil. Marvel writer-editor Roy Thomas recalled in 2007 that editor-in-chief Stan Lee "had the idea, and I think the names, for all three. He wanted to do some books that would have special appeal to girls. We were always looking for way to expand our franchise. My idea...was to try to get women to write them".

The series was written by writer Jean Thomas, who was at the time married to Roy Thomas, and by artist Winslow Mortimer. The stories, unlike most of Marvel's offerings at the time, contain no superheroes or fantastic elements. However, the night nurses encounter "danger, drama and death", as the cover tag proclaims, as they work to foil bomb plots, expose incompetent surgeons, and confront mob hitmen. Night Nurse #4, the final issue, took place away from Metro General and New York City, instead featuring Christine embroiled in a gothic adventure, complete with a foreboding mansion, dusty secret passageways, and mysterious lights.

In a 2010 interview, Jean Thomas offered her theory on the series' early cancellation:

Night Nurse was an attempt to create a comics book for the same audience of young girls who read such book series as Cherry Ames, Sue Barton, and Nancy Drew. Maybe the comic-book format just didn't appeal to that group. It may also have been difficult to distribute or display: too serious to be with romance comics but not male-action oriented enough to be with superhero comics, so, regrettably, low sales led to cancellation.

Linda Carter reappeared as a medical professional specializing in helping injured superheroes in Daredevil (vol. 2) #58 (May 2004), written by Brian Michael Bendis and drawn by Alex Maleev. Matt Murdock / Daredevil refers to her then as "the night nurse ... [who is] sympathetic to ... costumed persons who get a little nicked up in ... the call of duty."

Christine Palmer reappeared in Nightcrawler vol. 3, #1 (Sept. 2004). Series writer Roberto Aguirre-Sacasa explained he was "a huge fan" of Night Nurse, and brought back the character when he realized his first Nightcrawler story would take place in a hospital.

A one-shot issue, Night Nurse vol. 2, #1 (July 2015), reprinted the 1970s series' four issues, as well as Daredevil (vol. 2) #80 (February 2006).

Prior to Night Nurse, writer-editor Stan Lee and artist Al Hartley created the series Linda Carter, Student Nurse for Atlas Comics, Marvel's 1950s precursor. It ran nine issues (Sept. 1961–Jan. 1963).

== Characters ==
While the three roommates initially bicker amongst themselves, they soon bond over their shared loneliness, and become best friends. Originally, none of the three nurses then used "night nurse" as a label, though the "Next Issue" box in Night Nurse #1 stated, "More true-to-life adventures of Linda Carter, Night Nurse!".

=== Linda Carter ===
- First appearance: As Linda Carter: Linda Carter, Student Nurse #1 (September 1961) As Night Nurse: Daredevil #58 (May 2004)
- Created by: Stan Lee; Al Hartley

Linda Carter is the daughter of a doctor in Allentown, New York. After moving to New York City and moving in with roommates Christine Palmer and Georgia Jenkins, she meets and falls in love with Marshall Michaels, a wealthy businessman. When he forces her to choose between marrying him or staying at Metro General as a nurse, she chooses her career. In the following two issues of the series, Linda demonstrates that her skills are not limited to nursing practice, as she performs detective work to help expose an incompetent surgeon and prevents a hitman from murdering a patient. By the time the series was canceled, she had started a budding romance with Dr. Jack Tryon, a young resident doctor. Palmer is the protagonist of Night Nurse #4, with Carter making a one-panel cameo and Jenkins not appearing at all.

Carter reappears in Daredevil (vol. 2) #58 (May 2004), takes care of the seriously injured hero following his defeat by the Yakuza. Having been rescued by a superhero and wanting to pay the superhuman community back by ministering to heroes' health, often pro bono, she comes to provide off-the-record medical care for superheroes. During the superhero "Civil War" over government registration, Night Nurse takes Captain America's side against the registration act, and joins his resistance group. Carter teams with Doctor Strange in the five-issue miniseries Doctor Strange: The Oath (December 2006-April 2007). By the end, Carter and Strange enter into a relationship, which later ends.

=== Georgia Jenkins ===
- First appearance: Night Nurse #1 (November 1972)
- Created by: Jean Thomas; Win Mortimer

Georgia Jenkins is an African-American nurse who comes from an inner city neighborhood, blocks away from Metro General Hospital. On her days off from work, she provides free medical care to the people on her old block. She discovers that her older brother Ben was conned into nearly blowing up the hospital generator. Even though Ben has a change of heart and is shot while trying to protect the nurses, Georgia finds out in issue #3 that Ben has been sentenced to 10-to-20 years in prison. She angrily compares the harshness of his sentence to the fact that powerful mob criminals walk around freely.

=== Christine Palmer ===
- First appearance: Night Nurse #1 (November 1972)
- Created by: Jean Thomas; Win Mortimer

Christine Palmer leaves her home in "an exclusive Midwestern suburb" against her father's wishes, intending to "make a new life without her father's money". In issue #2, her father comes to New York to try to convince her to return to her life as a debutante, threatening that "if you don't come home by Thanksgiving, then don't come home at all!". Though she considers his offer, she elects to stay in New York and becomes a surgical nurse for Dr. William Sutton. When Sutton's career ends in disaster, she leaves New York City and her friends behind, and travels the country, finding a job as a private nurse for a paraplegic at a spooky mansion. However, this particular position is short-lived and Palmer ends up returning to Metropolitan General Hospital.

== In other media ==
=== Marvel Cinematic Universe ===
- Christine Palmer appears in media set in the Marvel Cinematic Universe (MCU), portrayed by Rachel McAdams. This version is a fellow surgeon, ex-girlfriend, and ally of Stephen Strange who appears in the live-action films Doctor Strange (2016) and Doctor Strange in the Multiverse of Madness (2022). Additionally, McAdams portrays a redheaded alternate timeline variant of Palmer in the latter film and voices a separate variant in the Disney+ animated series What If...?.
- Elements of Linda Carter and the Night Nurse series are incorporated into the MCU version of Claire Temple (portrayed by Rosario Dawson). Series showrunner Steven S. DeKnight noted that the character was originally "going to be the actual Night Nurse from the comics ... we had her name in a script and it came back that it was possible [Marvel Studios] was going to use her" in the Marvel Cinematic Universe and "had plans for her down the road", necessitating the change to the more obscure comics character Claire Temple. DeKnight later added "We just switched to another character that was very much kind of the same realm of Night Nurse".

=== Video games ===
An unidentified Night Nurse appears as an unlockable character in Marvel Strike Force. This version utilizes a gun that fires hypodermic needles.
