= Dan Buckley =

American entertainment executive

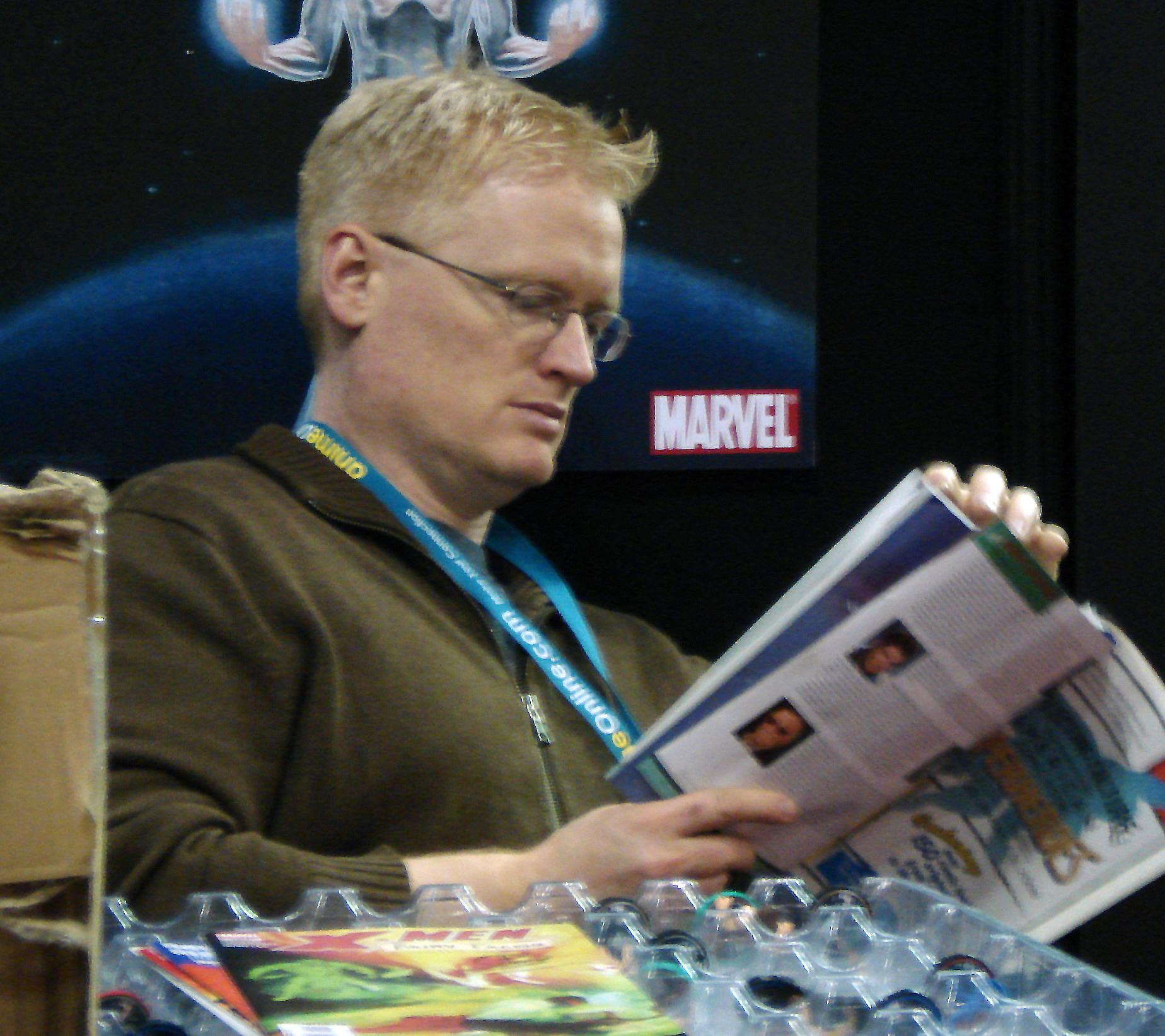
Buckley at the 2007 New York Comic Con

Dan Buckley is an American publishing executive, who is known for his work as Publisher, and then as President of Marvel Entertainment from January 2017 until it was disbanded and folded into various other divisions of The Walt Disney Company in 2023. He served as President of Marvel Comics and Franchise from 2023 until his departure from the company.

== Early life ==
Dan Buckley was raised in northern New York and later a New York city resident. He graduated in 1989 with a Bachelor of Arts degree in economics from St. Lawrence University. Buckley continued his studies at Rensselaer Polytechnic Institute which granted him an MBA in Marketing and International Relations in 1991. As a part of his studies at Rensselaer, he took a stint through MBA Exchange Program with the International University of Japan which allowed him to study in Japan.

== Career ==
In 1990, Buckley joined Marvel Enterprise, where he served in different positions from new product development to international publishing. His last position was as vice president of marketing services in 1997.

In 1997, Buckley left for a position at Omnicom's Radiate Group, Inc. His last position at Radiate was as vice president of operations and communications in 2003. At that time, he resided in Florida.

Buckley returned to the New York Metro area from Florida in October 2003 when he was named Marvel Enterprises publisher in 2003. By June 28, 2010, Buckley added the position of president of the print, animation & digital divisions of Marvel Worldwide to his publisher title. On January 18, 2017, he was promoted to President of Marvel Entertainment from president for TV, publishing and brand. Following the disbandment of Marvel Entertainment in 2023, his title was changed to President of Marvel Comics and Franchise. On May 18, 2026, it was announced that Buckley would be departing the company in mid-2027 following Brad Winderbaum's promotion to Head of Marvel Television, Animation, Comics & Franchise at Marvel.

On June 19, 2026, it was reported that Buckley would be take on the role of Executive Editor of the Midnight Universe for Marvel Comics, in addition to his current responsibilities.
