= Iron Fist season 1 =

Iron Fist
- Season 1
- Promotional poster
- Showrunner: Scott Buck
- Starring: Finn Jones; Jessica Henwick; Tom Pelphrey; Jessica Stroup; Ramón Rodríguez; Sacha Dhawan; Rosario Dawson; David Wenham
- No. of episodes: 13

Release
- Original network: Netflix
- Original release: March 17, 2017

Season chronology
- Next → Season 2

The first season of the American streaming television series Iron Fist, which is based on the Marvel Comics character of the same name, follows Danny Rand as he returns to New York City after being presumed dead for 15 years and must choose between his family's legacy and his duties as the Iron Fist. It is set in the Marvel Cinematic Universe (MCU), sharing continuity with the films and other television series of the franchise. The season was produced by Marvel Television in association with ABC Studios and Devilina Productions, with Scott Buck serving as showrunner.

Finn Jones stars as Rand, alongside Jessica Henwick, Tom Pelphrey, Jessica Stroup, Ramón Rodríguez, Sacha Dhawan, Rosario Dawson, and David Wenham. Development for the series began in late 2013, with Buck hired as the series' showrunner in December 2015 and Jones cast as Rand in February 2016. Filming took place in New York City from April to October 2016, with a focus placed on exploring the "One Percent of the One Percent" through story, location, and costume design. The character's martial arts background is also explored, and each episode is named after Shaolin kung fu sequences. As the last of several Marvel Netflix seasons to release before the crossover miniseries The Defenders, it features set-up for that event and references to those prior seasons.

The season premiered on March 15, 2017, in New York City, with the full season of 13 episodes released on Netflix on March 17. It received generally negative reviews from critics, particularly for its pace and storytelling, and Jones's performance. The appropriateness of his casting and storyline in terms of race was also widely discussed, while the season's fight sequences were criticized as an important element that were poorly acted, choreographed, and edited. Conversely, Henwick's performance and the use of established characters Claire Temple and Jeri Hogarth did receive some praise. Third-party data analytics determined the series had strong initial viewership, but this dropped within a week. The series was renewed for a second season in July 2017.

== Episodes ==
No. overall	No. in season	Title (Note: Each episode is named after Shaolin kung fu sequences.)	Directed by	Written by	Original release date
1	1	"Snow Gives Way"	John Dahl	Scott Buck	March 17, 2017
After being presumed dead for 15 years, when his family were the victims of a plane crash in the Himalayas, Danny Rand returns to New York City and goes to Rand Enterprises to meet with Harold Meachum, the partner of Rand's now dead father Wendell Rand. Rand is turned away by security, but uses martial arts to fight his way to Harold's children Ward and Joy. The Meachums reveal that Harold has been dead for years, and do not believe that Rand is who he says he is. Rand is also turned down by Colleen Wing, who he wishes to work for at her newly opened dojo. The Meachums believe that "Danny"'s appearance is a ploy by their rivals to create a leadership struggle ahead of their planned expansion to China, and Ward hires mercenaries to kill Rand. Wing witnesses him overpower them. Ward meets with Harold, who had faked his death and considers the possibility that Rand survived the plane crash. Rand attempts to tell Joy about Ward's actions, but she drugs him and has him institutionalized.
2	2	"Shadow Hawk Takes Flight"	John Dahl	Scott Buck	March 17, 2017
Rand is assigned to psychiatrist Paul Edmonds, to whom Rand reiterates his true identity. Harold watches Rand through the hospital's surveillance system, and sends Ward to offer Wing money in exchange for her testimony against Rand; she refuses after talking to Rand in the hospital. Harold secretly visits Rand and learns that Rand has become the Iron Fist and sworn enemy of the Hand. Rand is able to convince Joy of his identity, but Ward is not convinced. Rand explains to Edmonds that following the plane crash, he was saved by two monks and taken to K'un-Lun, another dimension that is connected to the Earth periodically. It was there that he trained in martial arts and gained the power of the Iron Fist. Edmonds is not convinced, and diagnoses Rand as suffering from post-traumatic stress disorder. Harold asks Ward to move Rand to a safe place where he can be useful, but Ward instead orders his men, disguised as patients at the hospital, to kill Rand. The latter uses the power of the Iron Fist to overpower them and escape.
3	3	"Rolling Thunder Cannon Punch"	Tom Shankland	Quinton Peeples	March 17, 2017
In his martial arts training at K'un-Lun, the young Rand survived brutal treatment at the hands of the monks. Now, the mysterious Madame Gao punishes Harold for leaving his secret penthouse to visit Rand. Wing is attacked by Ward's security personnel, whom she overpowers before giving shelter to Rand. He also visits Joy again and she offers him money to change his identity and leave. Rand refuses, and meets with his family's lawyer Jeri Hogarth who promises to reclaim his identity in exchange for a permanent contract between her firm and Rand Enterprises. After attacking an impolite student at Wing's dojo, Rand is forced to stay elsewhere and is gifted the use of an apartment by Hogarth. The lawyer uses fingerprint evidence to prove Rand's identity to Joy and Ward, and promises to present it in court if they stop Rand from retaking his family's company. Deducing that Harold is alive, Rand follows Ward and climbs up the side of the penthouse but is pushed off it. Harold forces Ward to buy a specific pier, which he does with help from Joy.
4	4	"Eight Diagram Dragon Palm"	Miguel Sapochnik	Scott Reynolds	March 17, 2017
After falling unconscious, Rand wakes up in the penthouse. Harold explains that the cancer which he "died" from was secretly cured by the Hand, who demanded his loyalty in return and allowed him to reveal the truth only to Ward. Harold asks Rand to destroy the Hand in order to free him, and orders Ward to accept Rand's return to the company where his return is announced in a press conference. In a board meeting, Rand uses his position as the majority shareholder to enforce his decision to cheaply sell a newly developed drug in order to save more lives. At his apartment, Joy is attacked and wounded by Triad operatives, whom Rand overpowers. He takes her to Wing's dojo before confronting the Triad leader, Hai-Qing Yang, who holds a grudge against Joy for taking the pier. However, he stands down when Rand reveals the involvement of the Hand. As a reward for securing the pier, the Hand allows Harold to remotely observe Joy. He sees that she has been wounded, and kills the Triad member responsible.
5	5	"Under Leaf Pluck Lotus"	Uta Briesewitz	Cristine Chambers	March 17, 2017
A new synthetic heroin appears in New York, which Rand connects to the Hand. After a chemical factory owned by Rand Enterprises is linked to cancer, Rand personally apologizes to an aggrieved citizen and is recorded by a lawyer who distributes it to the media. In a board meeting that Rand is absent from, Ward convinces the shareholders to stand against the accusations instead of accepting responsibility. However, the anxiety of always being watched by Harold causes Ward to try the new heroin. Rand convinces Wing to help him infiltrate the pier, where they find containers apparently loaded with normal supplies. Inside one he discovers Radovan Bernivig, the chemist who was forced to create the heroin as the Hand held his daughter hostage. Rand fights off a guard to free Bernivig, but the latter is stabbed by the guard. At Wing's dojo, student Claire Temple is able to provide aid as a former nurse with experience working alongside powered heroes. Wing vows to help Rand defeat the Hand, while Gao kills the guard for failing.
6	6	"Immortal Emerges from Cave"	RZA	Dwain Worrell	March 17, 2017
Joy convinces Ward to throw away the drugs he is using. Rand and Ward start searching Rand warehouses for clues as to the Hand's operation, and find the severed head of Bernivig's guard as a message challenging Rand to a combat. Rand sends Ward to deal with a crisis management meeting about the video of his apology while Rand accepts the challenge: Rand will fight to free Bernivig's daughter Sabina, and leave his company to the Hand's machinations if he loses. Rand faces Andrei and Grigori Veznikov, the Bride of Nine Spiders, and Scythe, besting them all in turn with the spiritual help of his K'un-Lun mentor Lei Kung; however, Rand refuses to kill Scythe as Lei Kung orders. Gao frees Sabina, reveals that she has been to K'un-Lun and knew Wendell, and easily overpowers Rand telekinetically. Bernivig's condition becomes critical, forcing Temple and Wing to take him to a hospital where he is abducted by the Hand. Ward goes into withdrawal at the meeting, and is only stopped from causing further trouble by Joy.
7	7	"Felling Tree with Roots"	Farren Blackburn	Ian Stokes	March 17, 2017
Two Hand operatives interrogate Harold, who fights them off with Rand's help. Harold kills them, and has Ward dump the bodies in a river. Rand begins to develop a romantic relationship with Wing, and starts investigating his father. Gao arrives at Rand Enterprises, advising Rand to stay out of her way. Rand sees her discussing business with a Rand employee, and later convinces the latter to leave the city and give him her password. Rand and Wing persuade Yang to help them fight the Hand, while Joy convinces Ward to take a break from the company. In a board meeting, Rand announces his decision to close the Staten Island plant while keeping the workers on payroll; the board decides to oust Rand, Ward, and Joy. Rand, Wing, and Yang's operatives attack a Hand facility and find a dying Bernivig. He reveals that Gao has gone to Anzhou, China, which is where the Rands were going when their plane crashed. Harold discovers Ward's plan to leave and takes his money; Ward confronts his father, and kills him, dumping his body in the river.
8	8	"The Blessing of Many Fractures"	Kevin Tancharoen	Tamara Becher-Wilkinson	March 17, 2017
Rand deduces that his father was going to Anzhou to shut down Gao's operations, but their plane was targeted by her on the way with the Hand poisoning the pilots. Rand, Wing, and Temple travel to Anzhou themselves, where they acquire information from a nearby beggar. They infiltrate the Hand facility there as Gao arrives. Rand engages with the drunken Zhou Cheng, who has been training to fight the student of Lei Kung. Rand almost beats Cheng to death, until the intervention of Temple and Wing. Gao and her men engage the trio, and Rand is able to use the power of the Iron Fist to best them and capture Gao. The board offers Ward and Joy a severance deal to help convince them to leave, and the desperate Ward attempts to accept it. Joy refuses for the pair of them and hires a private investigator to find evidence that she can use to blackmail the board members and allow them to stay on. Learning of this, Ward decides to tell Joy about Harold and takes her to the penthouse, but changes his mind due to the guilt of killing their father.
9	9	"The Mistress of All Agonies"	Jet Wilkinson	Pat Charles	March 17, 2017
Rand takes Gao to Wing's dojo, where Temple suggests they use truth serum to force her to talk. Rand steals some from Rand Enterprises, and Gao begins to talk about Rand's parents before revealing that she is lying and can resist the influence of the serum. Wing reveals to the others that she was poisoned in Anzhou, and contacts her mentor Bakuto. Gao's operatives attack the dojo, but are defeated, and Bakuto soon arrives. He teaches Rand how to use the power of the Iron Fist to heal Wing, before taking Wing, Rand, and Gao away. Meanwhile, Harold reawakens from death and over several hours regains relatively normal mental functions. He finds Ward at the penthouse and feigns absolution. Ward learns from Yang that those revived by the Hand become more psychotic after each revival and attack those closest to them first. Harold kills his assistant Kyle and places heroin in Ward's car to frame him. Ward is given to the care of Edmonds at the psychiatric hospital, while Joy reunites with Harold at the penthouse.
10	10	"Black Tiger Steals Heart"	Peter Hoar	Quinton Peeples	March 17, 2017
Rand wakes up at an academy run by Bakuto, who teaches him how to recharge his "chi". Rand grows suspicious and infiltrates a restricted area where he learns from an imprisoned Gao that Bakuto is a Hand leader himself. Rand confronts Wing, who insists that their faction of the Hand is "good" and in opposition to Gao's "bad" faction. Bakuto visits Harold and offers a partnership. Rand learns that Bakuto's Hand is conducting mass surveillance, and attempts to escape from the academy. He is aided in this by his childhood friend Davos. Bakuto stabs Rand with an unknown object before he and Davos fight their way to the academy gates. Rand is now unable to summon the power of the Iron Fist to open the gate, but Wing is able to open it and offers a distraction to allow the duo to escape. Davos tells Rand that they must return to K'un-Lun. Acting on Joy's blackmail material, Harold kills a member of the board but stages it as suicide and denies his involvement to Joy. She convinces the board to reinstate the Meachums and Rand.
11	11	"Lead Horse Back to Stable"	Deborah Chow	Ian Stokes	March 17, 2017
Rand refuses to return to K'un-Lun until the Hand is destroyed, and Davos questions his motives. He and Davos visit Temple, where she is able to remove the shrapnel of Bakuto's weapon from Rand's wound but does not have the antibiotics required to control the infection. Wing arrives and tries to reason with Rand. She tries to prove her feelings for him by using her connection to a Hand member at a hospital to get antibiotics for his wound. Rand goes to the penthouse, where Joy has discovered that Bakuto has been transferring Rand Enterprises's money to his own accounts. Harold decides to kill Bakuto and formulates a plan to flush him and his operatives out of the compound by having Joy freeze their accounts. Rand agrees to help Harold kill Bakuto, but Joy is against this. The Hand captures Wing and takes her to the compound, where Rand and Davos wait for Bakuto to emerge. Wing frees herself, escapes, and Rand rushes to her rather than waiting for Bakuto, revealing his feelings for her to Davos.
12	12	"Bar the Big Boss"	Andy Goddard	Scott Reynolds	March 17, 2017
Ward escapes the hospital and goes to the penthouse where he tries to get Joy away from Harold. Bakuto and his operatives arrive, with the former shooting Joy and giving Rand half an hour to arrive at the penthouse to save the Meachums. Against Davos's objections, Rand decides to go and arrives before Bakuto can decapitate Harold (which would kill him for good). Rand uses the power of the Iron Fist to fight off the Hand operatives as Davos and Wing arrive to help. Wing confronts Bakuto, overpowering him but refusing to kill him. Rand also refuses, but Davos does it. An enraged Rand attacks Davos and defeats him, but spares him. Davos reveals his jealousy that Rand was chosen to be the Iron Fist, and his rage that Rand abandoned the sacred duty of the Iron Fist to protect K'un-Lun. Davos leaves. Rand and Wing find Bakuto's body missing. Harold and Ward take Joy to a hospital. The next day, Ward warns Rand that he has been set up by Harold, just as DEA agents arrive at the dojo. Rand and Wing fight them off and escape.
13	13	"Dragon Plays with Fire"	Stephen Surjik	Scott Buck & Tamara Becher-Wilkinson & Pat Charles	March 17, 2017
Harold takes control of Rand Enterprises. Rand and Wing go to the academy, now abandoned by the Hand, where Gao reveals that Harold masterminded the plane crash that killed Rand's parents. Ward tells Joy about Harold's actions, and she confronts him about it. Harold denies framing Rand, and Joy decides to leave. Ward allies with Rand, Wing, and Temple to help defeat Harold. He goes to Rand Enterprises, where he is wounded by Harold, but is able to find evidence of Rand's innocence. Temple creates a distraction so that Rand and Wing can infiltrate the building, and the pair is able to fight off Harold's operatives. Rand follows Harold to the rooftop, where they fight. Ward arrives and shoots Harold, who falls from the building to his death. Ward has the body cremated to ensure he does not return. Joy meets with Davos, who tells her that Rand must be killed. This is overheard by Gao. Rand convinces Wing to accompany him to K'un-Lun, but they arrive at the gate to find it shut off from the Earth, and surrounded by dead Hand operatives.

== Cast and characters ==
=== Main ===
- Finn Jones as Danny Rand / Iron Fist
- Jessica Henwick as Colleen Wing
- Tom Pelphrey as Ward Meachum
- Jessica Stroup as Joy Meachum
- Ramón Rodríguez as Bakuto
- Sacha Dhawan as Davos
- Rosario Dawson as Claire Temple
- David Wenham as Harold Meachum

=== Recurring ===
- David Furr as Wendell Rand
- Barrett Doss as Megan
- Alex Wyse as Kyle
- Marquis Rodriguez as Darryl
- Wai Ching Ho as Gao
- Ramon Fernandez as Kevin Singleton
- Clifton Davis as Lawrence Wilkins
- John Sanders as Donald Hooper
- Elise Santora as Maria Rodriguez

=== Notable guests ===
- Carrie-Anne Moss as Jeri Hogarth
- Tijuana Ricks as Thembi Wallace
- Suzanne H. Smart as Shirley Benson

== Production ==
=== Development ===
In October 2013, Deadline reported that Marvel Television was preparing four drama series and a miniseries, totaling 60 episodes, to present to video on demand services and cable providers, with Netflix, Amazon, and WGN America expressing interest. A few weeks later, Marvel and Disney announced that Marvel Television and ABC Studios would provide Netflix with live action series centered around Iron Fist, Daredevil, Jessica Jones, and Luke Cage, leading up to a miniseries based on the Defenders. In April 2015, the official title was revealed to be Marvel's Iron Fist, and that December, Marvel announced that Scott Buck would serve as showrunner. John Dahl, Cindy Holland, Allie Goss, Alison Engel, Kris Henigman, Alan Fine, Stan Lee, Joe Quesada, Dan Buckley, Jim Chory, Jeph Loeb and Buck serve as executive producers on the series.

=== Writing ===
Each episode of the season is named after Shaolin kung fu sequences. Quesada stated in July 2016 that "there's a lot going on" in the season, with Buck and the season's writers weaving together "some great legends from Marvel present and past" including what Quesada believed to be the most antagonists in a single season of a Marvel Netflix series. Buck likened Iron Fist to a mystery, saying, "It's very much about how do you go about proving who you are when there's no way to do that, and that's not just the story, that's also the theme of it". The season begins with Danny Rand returning to New York after having been missing, presumed dead, for 15 years. Buck said that much of the season was "about a journey of finding self ... in terms of what he wants to be as far as 'Who is Danny Rand? What is the Iron Fist?' and then, 'How do these things get together?'" Loeb described the structure of the season as building "through a series of sort of metaphorical fights, which is very important in a martial arts film, to sort of show how the character needs to grow from the innocent, wide-eyed person to someone who has to come to terms with 'this is the way the outside world works—how am I going to make it work for me?'".

Continuing on the idea from the previous Marvel Netflix series that New York City is a "fifth Defender", Loeb said the season would examine the high-end financial world of New York City, examining "the One Percent of the One Percent and how that affects our world on a day-to-day basis... high-level corporation, Big Pharma, things like that". Actor Finn Jones added the season examined "corporate corruption and corporate responsibility in the modern world, and... how much do corporations have impact on society? And what we actually look at in the show is the heroin epidemic of the city, and how corporations maybe actually fund the heroin epidemic, and what that means to society". In terms of Rand donning a comic-based costume in the season, Buck stated, "There was no good reason we could imagine to put Danny Rand in a costume. Because Danny Rand is still discovering who he is as a hero and where he is going to be, so he's not yet ready to put on a mask or a costume. [A]t the same time he is someone who is rather well known as a billionaire, so he can't necessarily go out in public and do the things he does without being recognized. It does become an issue for the character."

=== Casting ===
The main cast for the season includes Finn Jones as Danny Rand / Iron Fist, Jessica Henwick as Colleen Wing, Tom Pelphrey as Ward Meachum, Jessica Stroup as Joy Meachum, Ramón Rodríguez as Bakuto, Sacha Dhawan as Davos, Rosario Dawson as Claire Temple, and David Wenham as Harold Meachum. Dawson reprises her role from previous Marvel Netflix series.

Recurring throughout the season are David Furr as Wendell Rand, Danny's father; Barrett Doss as Megan, a Rand Enterprises secretary; Alex Wyse as Kyle, Harold Meachum's personal assistant; and Ramon Fernandez as Kevin Singleton, Harold Meachum's bodyguard. Wai Ching Ho as Gao, reprising her role from Daredevil, and Marquis Rodriguez as Darryl, reprising his role from Luke Cage. Clifton Davis, John Sanders, and Elise Santora portray Lawrence Wilkins, Donald Hooper, and Maria Rodriguez, respectively, members of the Rand Enterprise board. Also returning from previous Marvel Netflix series are Carrie-Anne Moss as Jeri Hogarth, Tijuana Ricks as Thembi Wallace, and Suzanne H. Smart as Shirley Benson.

=== Design ===
Stephanie Maslansky is the costume designer for Iron Fist, after serving the same role for the previous Marvel Netflix series. Maslansky noted one of the differences with the season compared to the other Marvel Netflix series, was the neighborhoods it spent time in ("the wealthier neighborhoods; Midtown, Upper East Side, that sort of thing") compared to Hell's Kitchen for Daredevil and Jessica Jones and Harlem for Luke Cage. As such, Rand wears more suits than the other heroes, and given the amount of fighting he does in the season, a lot of spandex was added to increase the suits' flexibility. Rand's look evolves throughout the season, with Maslansky noting, "When we first meet him he's clearly traveled a long way. I wanted people to look at Danny and not be sure exactly what he was. A backpacker, or a homeless man. His look needed to reflect a variety of culture [and almost feel] otherworldly." Once Rand enters the corporate world, he settles on an "Urban Cali" style, which is "a little looser, little more relaxed. But it's still a suit. His tie is never tied tightly and he always wears sneakers." This relaxed style for Rand also provided "a strong contrast" to Ward Meachum who is a "far more corporate looking person." The monk costumes and Rand's warrior costume was based on "real Shaolin warrior monk costumes... I took that distinctive silhouette from the Shaolin warrior monk clothing, and we combined it with the traditional colors of the Iron Fist, green and gold." Regarding Gao, Maslansky stated "Her particular look is influenced by ancient China," particularly the Terracotta Army and further progresses the "villainy" look of the Marvel Netflix series of "surround[ing] themselves with [money], with beautiful things."

=== Filming ===
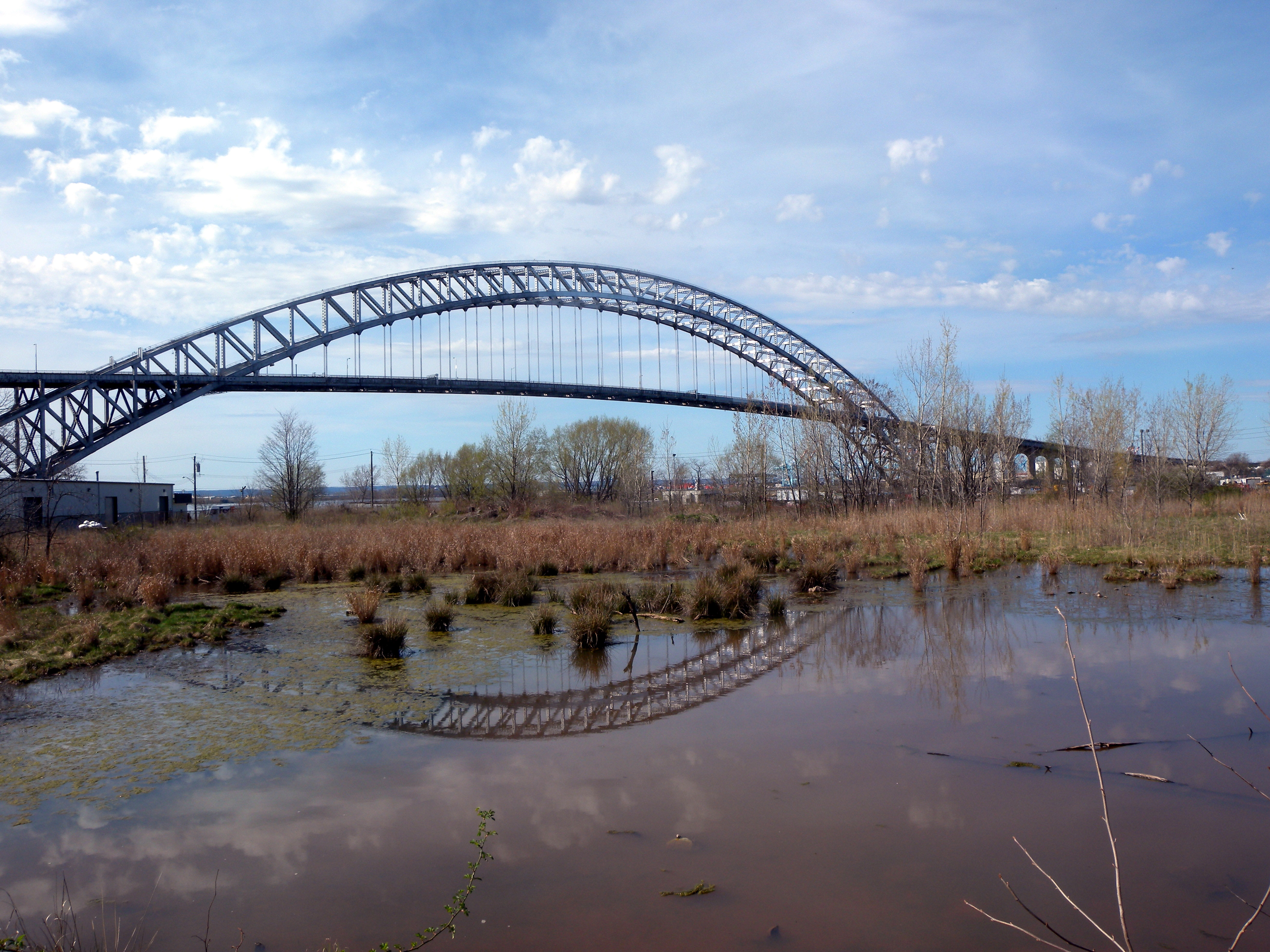
Bayonne Bridge doubled as Anzhou, China during production

Marvel announced in February 2014 that the series would be filmed in New York City, with Quesada stating in April that the show would be filming on location in addition to sound stage work. Photography began in April 2016 in New York City, with the working title Kick. Manuel Billeter served as director of photography after doing the same for the first seasons of Jessica Jones and Luke Cage.

Filming locations included Mariners Harbor and Sailors' Snug Harbor on Staten Island, which served as Bakuto's compound; 28 Liberty Street for the exterior of Rand Enterprises, while some interiors were filmed in the MetLife Building; 19 Gramercy Park South for Joy Meachum's home; City Hall Park; Chinatown, including Mott Street; the lobby of the General Electric Building for Harold Meachum's penthouse; the Manhattan Bridge; Green-Wood Cemetery; Bank of America Tower; Bryant Park; the Presidential Suite in the InterContinental New York Barclay Hotel, serving as Rand's temporary apartment; the STK Midtown restaurant; Brooklyn Navy Yard; Pelham Bay Park; the Bayonne Bridge, which doubled as Anzhou, China; and Sutton Place Park. Filming wrapped on October 8, 2016.

Iron Fist was filmed in high dynamic range (HDR), which Billeter stated added "a learning curve" to his work, forcing him to rethink how he would shoot certain scenes, such as a car lights or street lights, which become much brighter in HDR than previously. To compensate, lights would be painted on set to help "bring down the highlights". Post-production vendor Deluxe worked on the season to adjust colors the filming team did not have the chance to tweak on set.

==== Fight training and choreography ====
Brett Chan was the stunt-coordinator, fight choreographer, and second unit director for the season, having "full involvement in all the episodes". Buck wanted the fighting in the series to be mostly Wing Chun but with the animal styles of kung fu as well, and Chan worked alongside Buck and other Marvel executives during development of the fights. As a second unit director, the amount of creative input that Chan had depended on the episodic director he was working with. Chan was influenced by the works of the Shaw Brothers, Jackie Chan, Stephen Chow, Bruce Lee, and Yuen Woo-ping, but avoided being "floaty or wire-like" per a request from Marvel; wire work and CGI were used minimally for fights.

Chan worked closely with Jones during early preparation for the season, but during filming spent most of his time either choreographing sequences or working on-set. Chan noted that Jones had a very busy schedule, and it was difficult to find the time to train him in martial arts which Chan felt was "a lifestyle" and "isn't something you can just pick up, or train for every once in a while. It's something you need to be really involved in". He did note that Henwick trained for six hours every day regardless if she was scheduled to train that day or if she was filming. Jones elaborated that he had three weeks before filming began to train for the season, during which time he would spend two and a half hours a day training in martial arts before doing weight training in the afternoons. Once filming began, Jones had a day and a half during weekends in which he could continue his training, and otherwise would have to learn fight choreography 15 minutes before filming an action sequence. He described this process as "a baptism of fire and I just learned on the job".

=== Music ===
The executive producers wanted the score to feel modern, and composer Trevor Morris agreed not to use an orchestra. He did try some instruments to represent the Asian influence on the series, but these were deemed "too traditional" by the producers. Only some "heavily affected" Japanese flutes were ultimately used. Morris also looked to avoid using themes for different characters in a traditional way. He did write a theme for Rand, which is heard in the series' title sequence, as well as a theme for the Hand, but in general focused on environmental music. Additional music heard in the season includes "So Fresh, So Clean" by Outkast, "Krystal Karrington" by Camp Lo, "Heat of the Moment" by Killah Priest, "Black Mags" by The Cool Kids, "Hang N' Bang" by Vince Staples, "Blockbuster Night, Pt. 1" by Run the Jewels, and music from A Tribe Called Quest.

A soundtrack album featuring Morris's score was released by Marvel digitally on March 17, 2017, coinciding with the release of the season. Also included is the album-only single "Come Down", by Anderson .Paak. All music by Trevor Morris, except where noted:

Iron Fist (Original Soundtrack)
No.	Title	Length
1.	"Come Down" (by Anderson .Paak)	2:47
2.	"Iron Fist Main Titles"	1:15
3.	"Bad Tea"	1:46
4.	"We Got You, Danny"	1:03
5.	"Meditation Time"	2:33
6.	"Circus Bribe"	1:01
7.	"Circus Was in Town"	1:01
8.	"M&M Delivery"	1:24
9.	"The Iron Fist"	2:44
10.	"Dojo Intruders"	1:45
11.	"Close"	1:04
12.	"New Digs"	2:04
13.	"Brass Nuckles"	2:17
14.	"Unexpected Guests"	2:29
15.	"Gao DIY"	1:54
16.	"I Am the Weapon"	6:43
17.	"Please Stay"	2:19
18.	"The Gift of Anger"	2:47
19.	"Time Is Up, Danny"	2:03
20.	"Our Future"	2:04
21.	"New Duty"	2:10
22.	"Brother vs. Brother"	3:44
23.	"New Family"	1:18
24.	"Abandoned Academy"	1:36
25.	"The Battle is Won"	7:36
26.	"Things Changed"	2:57

=== Marvel Cinematic Universe tie-ins ===
In working around the other Marvel Netflix series, Buck described "a fair amount of freedom", but "because we are leading into The Defenders, we have to leave our show in a very specific place with our character, because we do sort of plant seeds and stories that will then come to fruition in The Defenders. There does have to be a lot of cooperation between all the different [series' showrunners]. But other than that, we work distinctly by ourselves." The season makes references to the events of The Avengers, the Hulk, Stark Industries, Jessica Jones, Daredevil, Luke Cage, and Seagate Prison, and mentions the Dogs of Hell biker gang, New York Bulletin editor-in-chief Mitchell Ellison and reporter Karen Page, Roxxon Oil and Midland Circle. The events of the second season of Daredevil, such as the Hand's attack on Metro General Hospital, are noted throughout the season, and the Hand's blood draining facility from that season is also seen.

== Marketing ==
In October 2016, Buck and the season's main cast promoted the season at New York Comic Con, debuting exclusive footage from the season and the first look at the first trailer. In early February 2017, the official trailer for the season was released. David Betancourt, reacting to the trailer for The Washington Post, compared the story it presents to that of Batman Begins (2005), and questioned the fact that Iron Fist's comic costume was not shown. Eric Francisco at Inverse noted that the trailer was widely criticized on Twitter for the season's depiction of Rand as an "insufferable college hippie". On March 15, 2017, the season held its premiere at the Tribeca Performing Arts Center in New York City.

== Release ==
The first season of Iron Fist was released on March 17, 2017, on the streaming service Netflix worldwide, in Ultra HD 4K and high dynamic range. The season, along with the additional Iron Fist season and the other Marvel Netflix series, was removed from Netflix on March 1, 2022, due to Netflix's license for the series ending and Disney regaining the rights. The season became available on Disney+ in the United States, Canada, United Kingdom, Ireland, Australia, and New Zealand on March 16, ahead of its debut in Disney+'s other markets by the end of 2022.

== Reception ==
=== Audience viewership ===
Netflix does not reveal subscriber viewership numbers for their series, but Parrot Analytics determined that the season generated over 63 million "Demand Expressions" at its peak, behind only Luke Cage's 69 million in terms of all the Marvel Netflix series, with Parrot calculating expressions "by evaluating streaming video, P2P-sharing, social chatter, and more." 7Park Data, which measures the number of streams on subscription video services, determined Iron Fist to be the most binge-watched premiere for Netflix in 2017 with 54.7% of Iron Fist streams on March 17, 2017, being of three episodes or more. The average score was 46.9%. 7Park Data also determined that Iron Fist accounted for 14.6% of all Netflix streams on its premiere date, the highest percentage of any series premiere measured by the company including previous Marvel Netflix premieres.

Parrot later revealed that demand for Iron Fist a week after it launched was halved. This was the largest drop in retention for a Marvel Netflix series, indicating "that people started binge-watching the show in its first few days and then didn't come back to finish the season the next weekend." The marketing analytics firm Jumpshot determined the season was the third-most viewed Netflix season in the first 30 days after it premiered, garnering 28% of the viewers that the second season of Daredevil received, which was the firm believed was the most viewed season. Jumpshot, which "analyzes click-stream data from an online panel of more than 100 million consumers", looked at the viewing behavior and activity of the company's U.S. members, factoring in the relative number of U.S. Netflix viewers who watched at least one episode of the season.

=== Critical response ===
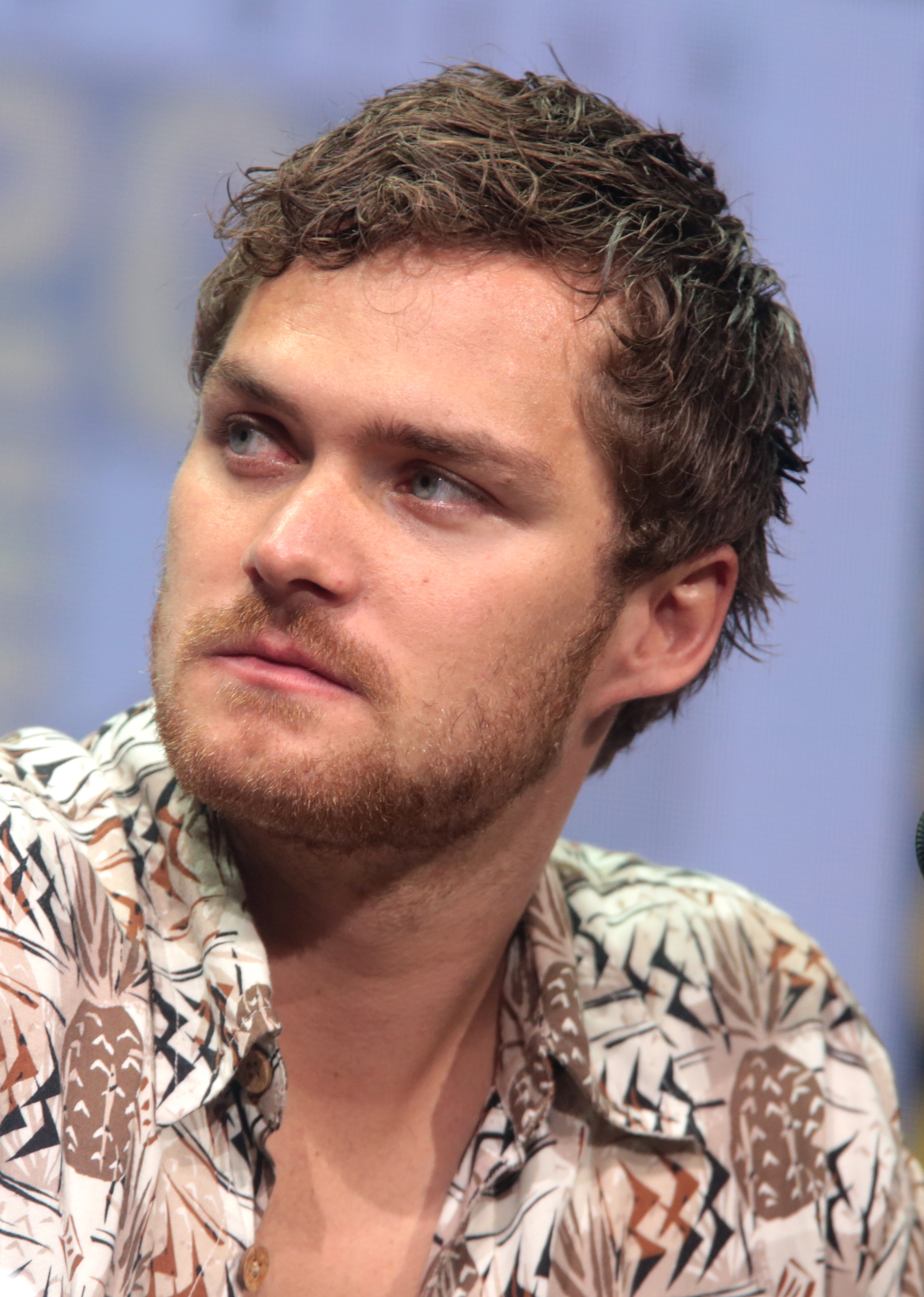
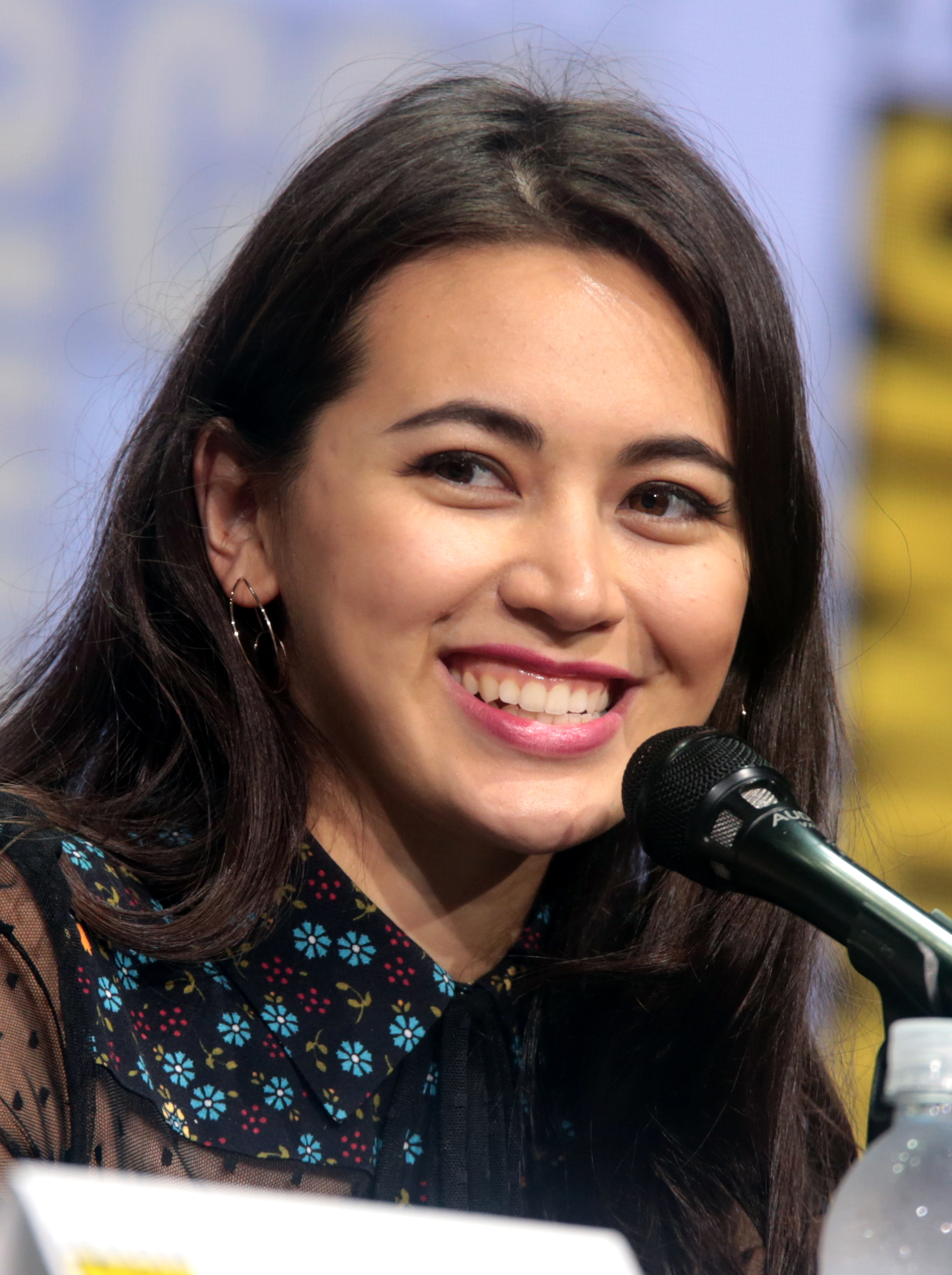
Series' lead Finn Jones (L) was criticized for his performance, but Jessica Henwick (R) was widely praised for hers.

The review aggregator website Rotten Tomatoes reported a 20% approval rating with an average rating of 4.20/10 based on 85 reviews. The website's critical consensus reads, "Despite some promising moments, Iron Fist is weighed down by an absence of momentum and originality." Metacritic, which uses a weighted average, assigned a score of 37 out of 100 based on reviews from 21 critics, indicating "generally unfavorable" reviews.

Reviewing the first six episodes of the season, Daniel Fienberg of The Hollywood Reporter found Iron Fist to be the "first big misstep" for Marvel and Netflix, lacking the "street-level authenticity" that their previous series had. Fienberg felt Jones was unable to elevate the material, instead coming across as "a spoiled frat boy". He said the season lacked basic character archetypes such as "a worthy adversary to our hero", comic relief, or a "voice of wise authority". Variety's Maureen Ryan gave a negative review for the first two episodes, calling them "ferociously boring" and "inessential". After criticizing the pacing, action, general characterization, production design, cinematography, and dialogue, Ryan suggested that Henwick should have been the star of the season instead of Jones.

Rob Sheffield of Rolling Stone criticized Jones' performance, calling him "totally devoid of charisma, more cub than lone wolf." He also felt the character was missing humor and inner turmoil, and said Rand's "mystic Zen quotes go over like a Wayne's World set-up minus the punch line." Allison Keene of Collider awarded the season 3 stars out of 5 after seeing the first six episodes. She said the season had a good cast and great origin story, but had a "glacial pace" and choppy editing. She did find Jones charming, but agreed with Fienberg that the season was lacking a villain, and felt that Temple was "shoe-horned" into the season. In his review for ScreenCrush, Kevin Fitzpatrick stated, "Iron Fist needed to be so much weirder than it actually is, akin to how Doctor Strange (2016) essentially re-told the Iron Man (2008) story with enough out-there visuals and eccentric supporting characters to paper over any shortcomings. Iron Fist starts to show signs of life in its sixth episode... but the slog in getting there is too great an ask, especially when the vast majority of the principal characters [are so] underdeveloped." Fitzpatrick felt that Colleen Wing was the better of the supporting characters, and praised Henwick's performance.

Uproxx's Alan Sepinwall felt of the first six episodes, "It's easily the worst of the Netflix Marvel shows", criticizing the pacing and "miscasting" of Jones. He was more positive about Moss and Dawson's roles. Sepinwall concluded, "the biggest problem with the new show is that no one involved seems to have any kind of take on the material. They're just making a mostly faithful but personality-free adaptation because someone at Marvel decided four years ago that Danny had to be [in The Defenders, and as a result,] we got a show that's so lifeless that I have no interest in finishing out the season". Dan Jolin also gave 3 stars out of 5 in his review for Empire. He felt it was beneficial that Iron Fist released after Doctor Strange introduced the MCU to "all his Eastern-mystical baggage", and called Iron Fist "a fresh presence" compared to "moody, conflicted heroism" of the other Defenders. Jolin did criticize that Buck had "no sense of connection to his subject" as previous Marvel Netflix showrunners had, and felt it was not until the sixth episode "that you really feel the pulp martial-arts-movie-riffing origins" thanks to episodic director RZA who "finally gives the show a proper sense of flair ... It's enough to make you wish they made him the showrunner." Jolin concluded, "Iron Fist works some fantastical flavor into the MCU's down-to-earth Defenders nook, but it needs more proper kung-fu flair than showrunner Buck allows."

Responding to these reviews, Jones said that "these shows are not made for critics, they are first and foremost made for the fans ... when the fans of the Marvel Netflix world and fans of the comic books view the show through the lens of just wanting to enjoy a superhero show, then they will really enjoy what they see." Jones later attributed the negative reviews to the fact that his character, "a white American billionaire", was similar to Donald Trump who had become "public enemy number one, especially in the US" between the making of the season and its release. In an article for Vox, Alex Abad-Santos said Jones was just attempting to "pass the blame" away from himself when the real problem with the season was "no one thought about what makes the character human". Abad-Santos suggested that the season be a warning to others telling stories about superheroes, who he thought needed to ensure they were "using established characters to touch on other topics—mental illness, parenthood, race, trauma—instead of simply rehashing old plots."

==== Fight scene criticisms ====
Feinberg, in his review, criticized the fight sequences in the season, calling them "weakly staged and all-too-brief, without any effort to even pretend that the show's leading man is doing any of his own stunts" and felt "Danny's strength and his enhanced abilities are barely explained and inconsistently depicted." Sepinwall described the fighting in the season as "both brief and unconvincing", criticizing Jones' ability to perform the fights as well as the way they were filmed and edited. One fight sequence, featuring 56 cuts for just 35 seconds of footage, was highlighted by some fans and critics as emblematic of the season's fight problems, with The Independent's Christopher Hooton saying the editing created this "disorientating, messy and ultimately not particularly impactful sequence". He compared it to what he believed to be the superior work of Jackie Chan, citing a single take fight scene featuring that performer, as well as the fight scenes from Daredevil which "had great success with a more considered shot selection and more minimal cutting than Iron Fist".

Aloysius Low at CNET also compared Jones's fighting in the season to that of Chan as well as Jet Li, saying, "There's none of that elegance I expect from a kung fu master, and he gets hit way too easily for a trained expert." Low also criticized the fact that Jones was unable to fight with both of his fists in the season, while noting that what he believed to be the best fight of the season was when Jones was faced with the drunken fist technique and was losing because of it with Rand only winning that fight due to "the inevitable invincibility of [his] plot armor". Brook H. at Pop Culture Uncovered felt that many of the season's fight scene issues stemmed from a decision to model Iron Fist on the American action films of the 1980s and 1990s, rather than updating the style of 1970s Hong Kong films: the season has "no fluidity, variety, interesting styles, or back-and-forth between combatants. These fights were an American interpretation of martial arts, using the visage of kung fu to mask nothing more than straightforward brawling." Brook H.'s piece noted that Brett Chan had extensive experience working as a stunt coordinator, but limited time working as a fight choreographer before joining the series, while a professional fight choreographer discussing the season felt the choreography was not the problem as "I can see where the choreographers were going" but the actors, particularly Jones, were just not skilled enough to deliver on them. The quick cut editing was also criticized, again, as well as attempts to "slow-down Wachowski-style, only to speed right back up" which "failed miserably".

=== Casting controversy ===
Following the announcement of the series, Russ Burlingame noted for ComicBook.com that Marvel may have been tempted to change Danny Rand from white to a person of Asian descent, especially given that the other Marvel Netflix series Jessica Jones and Luke Cage already set a precedent of increasing diversity by exploring a female and African-American lead, respectively. However, Burlingame was against this happening, wanting to see "the classic" version of the character, and feeling that making the character Asian simply because he is a martial artist was itself "quietly, subtly racist". This situation, of casting either a white or Asian-American actor in the role, was described as "lose/lose" by Devin Faraci of Birth.Movies.Death, while Albert Ching at Comic Book Resources was strictly against casting an Asian-American. He said that any extra Asian-American representation onscreen would be positive, but that he was not comfortable with the idea of the first major Asian superhero in film or television being a martial artist. Ching questioned why this discussion had not been raised with any other character, and suggested that a non-white, non-Asian actor be cast instead to avoid either issues. He highlighted the casting of Chloe Bennet and Ming-Na Wen in the MCU series Agents of S.H.I.E.L.D., both in "non-stereotypical roles", as examples of what roles he would rather have Asian-Americans be cast in.

In response to this, Keith Chow at The Nerds of Color specifically asked Marvel to cast an Asian-American in the role. Chow focused on the lack of Asian-American representation in mainstream television and films, the fact that the character's story would not have to change to accommodate this difference, and how it would stop elements of the "white savior" trope being depicted where a "white-guy-is-better-at-being-Asian-than-the-Asians". Chow did not feel it was equivalent to simply add a different Asian hero to the series such as Shang-Chi as there is a difference between the experience of an Asian character and an Asian-American, with the latter still being able to have a "fish out of water" storyline as Rand does in the comics. Chow disagreed that it was racist to have an Asian-American martial artist, as martial arts are a natural part of an Asian-American's heritage and would not be the only thing the character does; he gave the example of Daniel Wu in Into the Badlands, the only other Asian American lead of a mainstream martial arts series, who agreed to star in that series despite the perceived stereotypes because of the characterization beyond fighting, and because his "culture did create kung fu, so is that a stereotype? No it's part of [my] history". Chow started the hashtag #AAIronFist on Twitter, beginning a movement that received support from "high profile people" such as Lexi Alexander and Gail Simone.

Marvel and Netflix became aware of the movement to cast an Asian-American as Danny Rand, particularly after Chow began writing on the subject in March 2014, and considered several Asian-American actors for the role. This included Lewis Tan, who went on to guest star as the villain Zhou Cheng in the season. However, by the time Buck was announced as showrunner in December 2015, the studios were "leaning toward keeping Iron Fist white." Jones, who is white, was cast in February 2016.

Following the casting, io9's Rob Bricken spoke out against commentators who accepted Jones's casting because Marvel had been in a "damned if they do, damned if they don't" situation, feeling this was not true because the benefits that could have come from casting an Asian-American actor—including having the character "reclaim his Asian heritage, instead of taking it from others"—outweighed just copying the stereotypes from the comics. His colleague Katharine Trendecosta later added, after watching the completed season, that an Asian-American Danny Rand would have been more interesting than the final version, especially in being able to explore how he felt about returning to America having become more of a stereotype, and feeling out of place in K'un Lun due to being American while feeling out of place among the high-society circles of America due to being Asian. In response to these criticisms, Jones agreed that "there needs to be more diversity in film and television" but was confused why Iron Fist in particular had been targeted by internet commentators and said that they should get angry at "real problems in the world" instead. After the irony of him championing diversity through his Twitter account was raised with Jones in March 2017, he added that the producers chose to lean in to the problematic aspects of the character and surround him with "one of the most diverse" casts of the Marvel Netflix series to create a "socially progressive story" without alienating the comic fan base. Jones subsequently took down his Twitter account.

In response to specific criticisms that Rand is a "white savior", Buck said that he had approached the character without knowing of the racial issues surrounding him and his comic history, and that "I can say most definitively Danny Rand is no white saviour. He's trying to save himself, if anything." Jones agreed, saying, "Danny Rand is not a white savior. Danny Rand can hardly save himself, let alone an entire race of people. He is a very complicated, vulnerable individual." Jones felt that changing K'un Lun to be a multi-cultural place for the series aided in lessening the white savior narrative, while stating, "It's up to the writers to address thematic and narrative choices. And it's up to us as actors to try and breathe life into these characters as truthfully and as honestly and with [as much] genuine passion as possible." Roy Thomas, co-creator of the character, also defended the season following accusations of cultural appropriation, saying that the character was created for a less "PC" time and that K'un Lun was always meant to be a mythical place rather than a representation of Asia. Thomas added that he would not be bothered if the character had been changed to Asian-American, but was not "ashamed" that Rand remained white.

=== Accolades ===
The season was nominated for Best New Media Superhero Series at the 44th Saturn Awards, but lost to Marvel's own The Punisher.
