= List of Iron Fist characters =

Iron Fist is an American streaming television series created for Netflix by Scott Buck, based on the Marvel Comics character of the same name. It is set in the Marvel Cinematic Universe (MCU), sharing continuity with the films of the franchise, and is the fourth in a series of shows that lead up to a Defenders crossover miniseries.

The series stars Finn Jones as Danny Rand / Iron Fist, with Jessica Henwick, Tom Pelphrey, Jessica Stroup, and Sacha Dhawan also starring. They are joined by Ramón Rodríguez, Rosario Dawson and David Wenham in the first season, with Simone Missick and Alice Eve starring in the second. In addition to original characters, several characters based on various Marvel properties also appear throughout the series.

Jones reprises the role in the Marvel Studios Disney+ series Daredevil: Born Again (2025–present).

== Overview ==
Character	Portrayed by	Appearances		
Character	Portrayed by	First	Season 1	Season 2
Main characters
Danny Rand Iron Fist	Finn Jones	"Snow Gives Way"	Main	Main
Colleen Wing	Jessica Henwick	"Snow Gives Way"	Main	Main
Ward Meachum	Tom Pelphrey	"Snow Gives Way"	Main	Main
Joy Meachum	Jessica Stroup	"Snow Gives Way"	Main	Main
Bakuto	Ramón Rodríguez	"Felling Tree with Roots"	Main	
Davos	Sacha Dhawan	"The Mistress of All Agonies"	Main	Main
Claire Temple	Rosario Dawson	"Under Leaf Pluck Lotus"	Main	
Harold Meachum	David Wenham	"Snow Gives Way"	Main	
Misty Knight	Simone Missick	"Target: Iron Fist"		Main
Mary Walker	Alice Eve	"The Fury of Iron Fist"		Main
Recurring characters
Wendell Rand	David Furr	"Snow Gives Way"	Recurring	
Megan	Barrett Doss	"Snow Gives Way"	Recurring	
Kyle	Alex Wyse	"Snow Gives Way"	Recurring	
Darryl	Marquis Rodriguez	"Shadow Hawk Takes Flight"	Recurring	
Gao	Wai Ching Ho	"Rolling Thunder Cannon Punch"	Recurring	
Kevin Singleton	Ramon Fernandez	"Rolling Thunder Cannon Punch"	Recurring	
Lawrence Wilkins	Clifton Davis	"Eight Diagram Dragon Palm"	Recurring	
Donald Hooper	John Sanders	"Eight Diagram Dragon Palm"	Recurring	
Maria Rodriguez	Elise Santora	"Eight Diagram Dragon Palm"	Recurring	
Bethany	Natalie Smith	"The Fury of Iron Fist"		Recurring
BB	Giullian Yao Gioiello	"The Fury of Iron Fist"		Recurring
Ryhno	Jason Lai	"The Fury of Iron Fist"		Recurring
Torx	Jowin Marie Batoon	"The City's Not for Burning"		Recurring
Hex	Sydney Mae Diaz	"The City's Not for Burning"		Recurring
Sherry Yang	Christine Toy Johnson	"The City's Not for Burning"		Recurring
Sam Chung	James C. Chen	"The City's Not for Burning"		Recurring
Chen Wu	Fernando Chien	"The City's Not for Burning"		Recurring

== Main characters ==
=== Danny Rand / Iron Fist ===
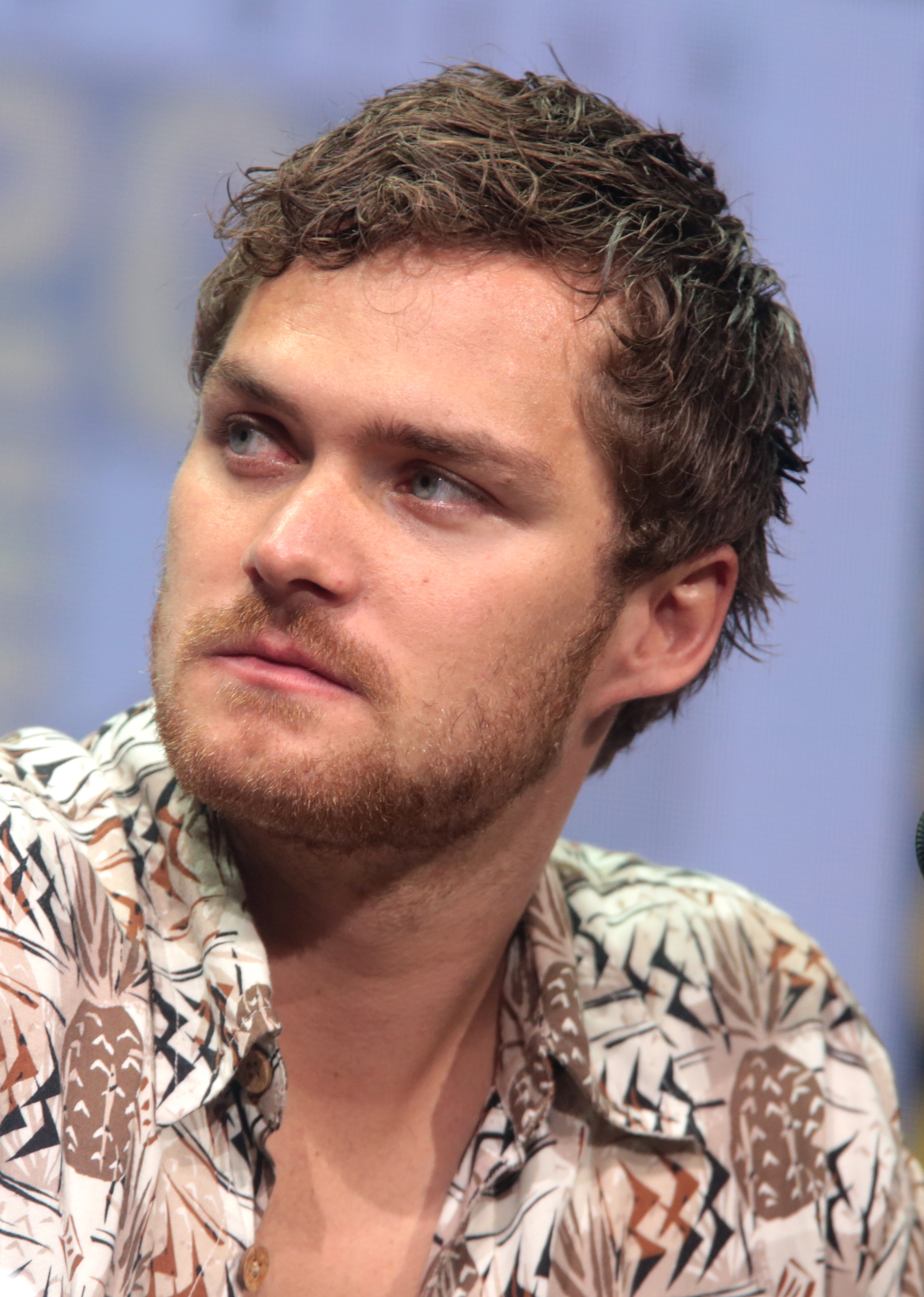
Finn Jones

Daniel "Danny" Rand / Iron Fist (portrayed by Finn Jones) is a billionaire Buddhist monk and martial artist proficient in kung-fu, with the ability to call upon the mystical power of the Iron Fist.

Jones described the character as "someone struggling to find his identity", and identified with the character's loneliness being an orphan like Rand. He noted that "Danny gets really stressed and really pissed off sometimes, and I understand that ... [his] optimism and where that comes from." In preparation for the role, Jones studied kung fu, wushu, and tai chi, along with weight training, Buddhist philosophy, and meditation. Toby Nichols portrays a young Danny Rand.

Jones is set to reprise the role in the third season of the Marvel Studios Disney+ series Daredevil: Born Again (2027).

=== Colleen Wing ===
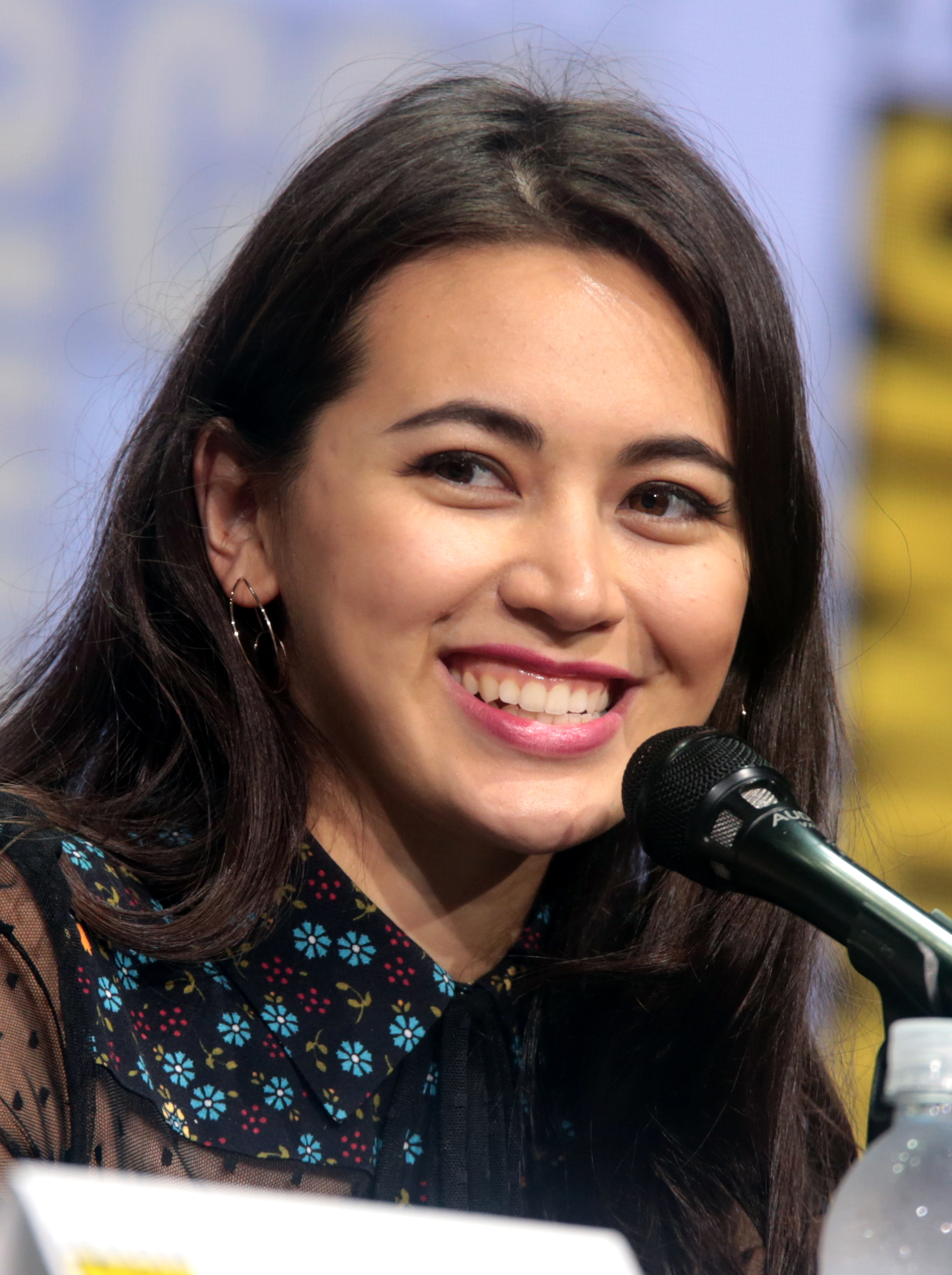
Jessica Henwick

Colleen Wing (portrayed by Jessica Henwick), a bushido master, is sensei of Chikara Dojo in New York City, and is integral to Daniel Rand's reintegration into society, foiling an attempt by Ward Meacham to have Rand indefinitely committed to Birch Psychiatric Hospital.

Henwick felt the most defining word for Wing was "alone", saying, "She doesn't want to be anyone's love interest and open herself up in that way." Henwick also tried "to pull out that sort of very dry humor that [Wing] has, and that no bullshit New Yorker demeanor" from the comics version in her portrayal.

=== Ward Meachum ===
Ward Meachum (portrayed by Tom Pelphrey) is the son of Harold and childhood acquaintance of Rand, whose work building up Rand Enterprises with his sister Joy is threatened to be undone with Rand's return.

Ward is a character from the comics, but with altered familial connections. As Pelphrey noted, "we're not necessarily beholden to representing him [in the series] exactly as he appears in the comic book." Stroup said that Ward would experience some "male angst" on Rand's return, because "Ward would have been the one who picked on [Rand] when he was little so as pure and innocent and great as Iron Fist is, he comes in and he causes some problems" there. Ilan Eskenazi portrays a teenage Ward Meachum.

=== Joy Meachum ===
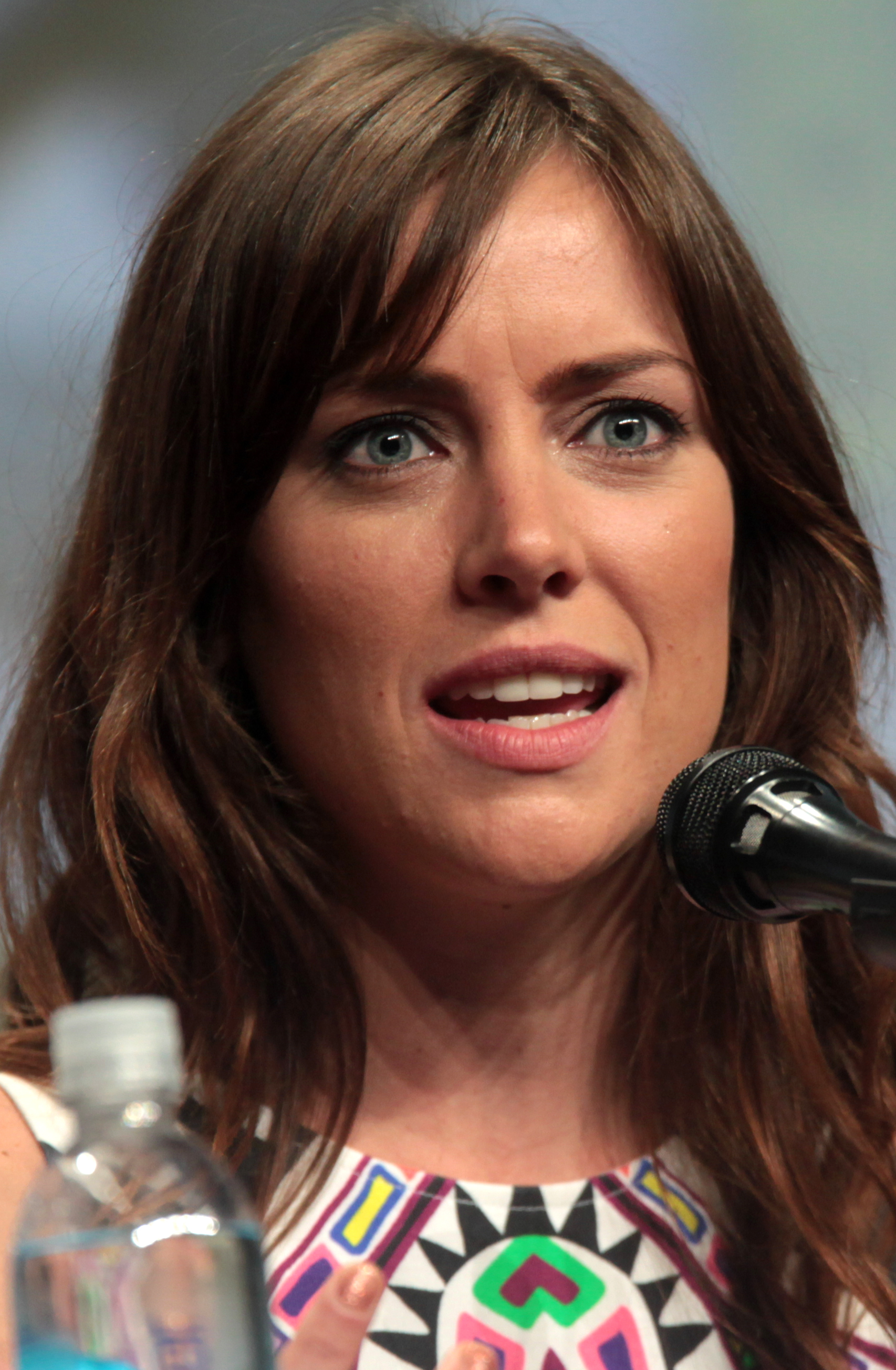
Jessica Stroup

Joy Meachum (portrayed by Jessica Stroup) is the daughter of Harold and childhood acquaintance of Rand, whose work building up Rand Enterprises with her brother Ward is threatened to be undone with Rand's return.

Stroup said that Joy "absolutely loves" Rand, and his return to New York is "like this rebirth of what she once was, and she gets to ask these questions about herself because he's posing them to her." Stroup said that Joy would initially be unsure whether Rand is who he says he is. Aimee Laurence portrays a young Joy Meachum.

=== Bakuto ===
Bakuto (portrayed by Ramón Rodríguez) is a leader of a faction of The Hand and Colleen Wing's sensei.

Bakuto at first appears to be a benevolent person, aiding Danny Rand in his abilities and showing him footage of the previous Iron Fist, but soon it becomes apparent that he wishes to use Danny for his own purposes and especially has plans for the Meachums. After shooting Joy Meachum, he and his men take Danny, but end up fighting him along with Colleen and Davos. Bakuto battles Colleen with swords, but he is stabbed by his former pupil. Colleen refuses to kill Bakuto, so Davos does it for her. His body then disappears. Colleen assumes that Bakuto's people took it, but Danny recalls that Harold Meachum managed to come back from the dead.

=== Davos ===
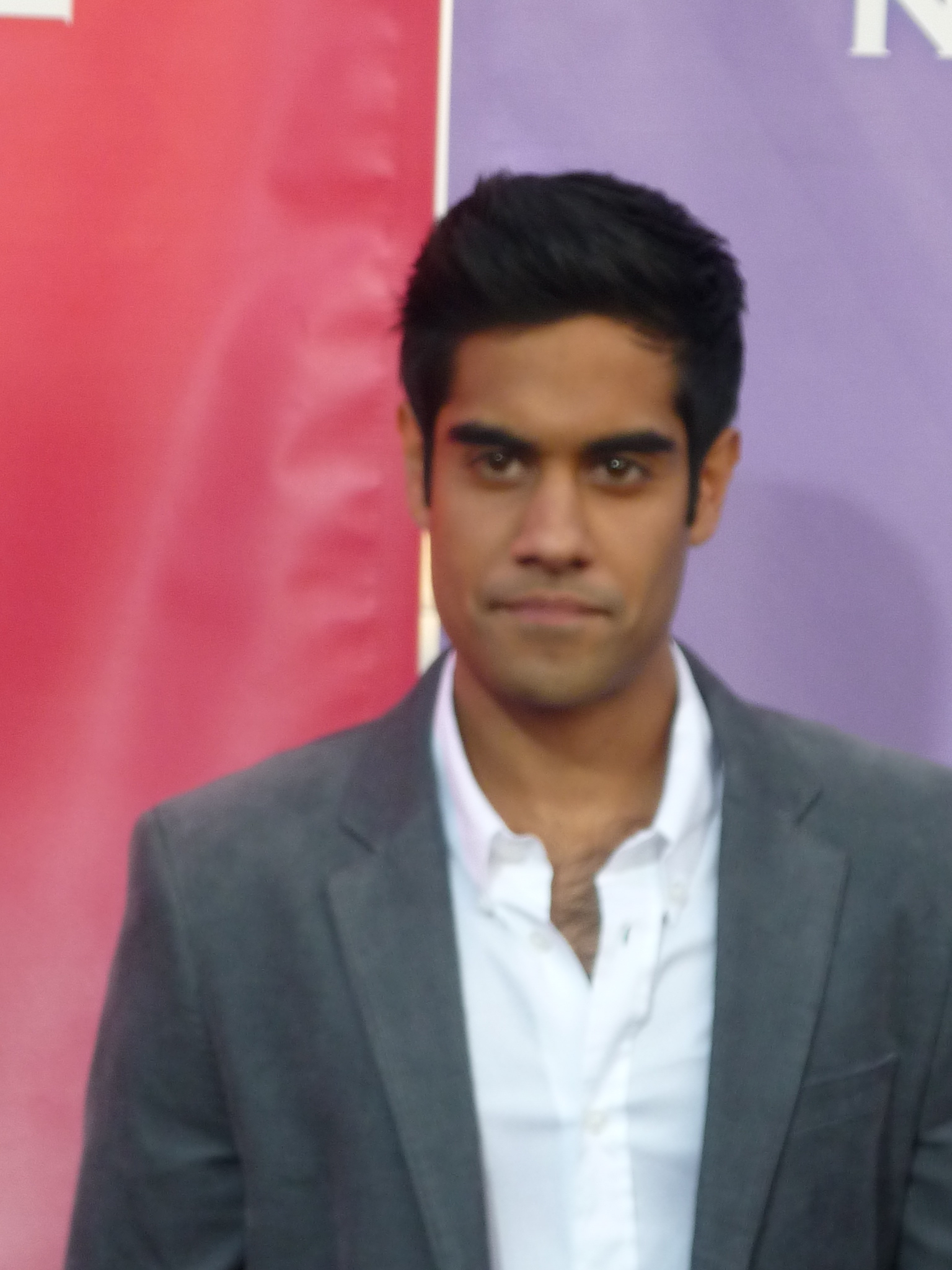
Sacha Dhawan

Davos (portrayed by Sacha Dhawan) is a skilled martial artist who is the son of Lei Kung and Rand's former best friend in K'un-Lun, who grew envious when Rand became the Iron Fist.

Although Dhawan first appeared in the ninth episode of the first season, Dhawan noted that the majority of Davos' storyline was intended to be explored in the second season.

=== Claire Temple ===
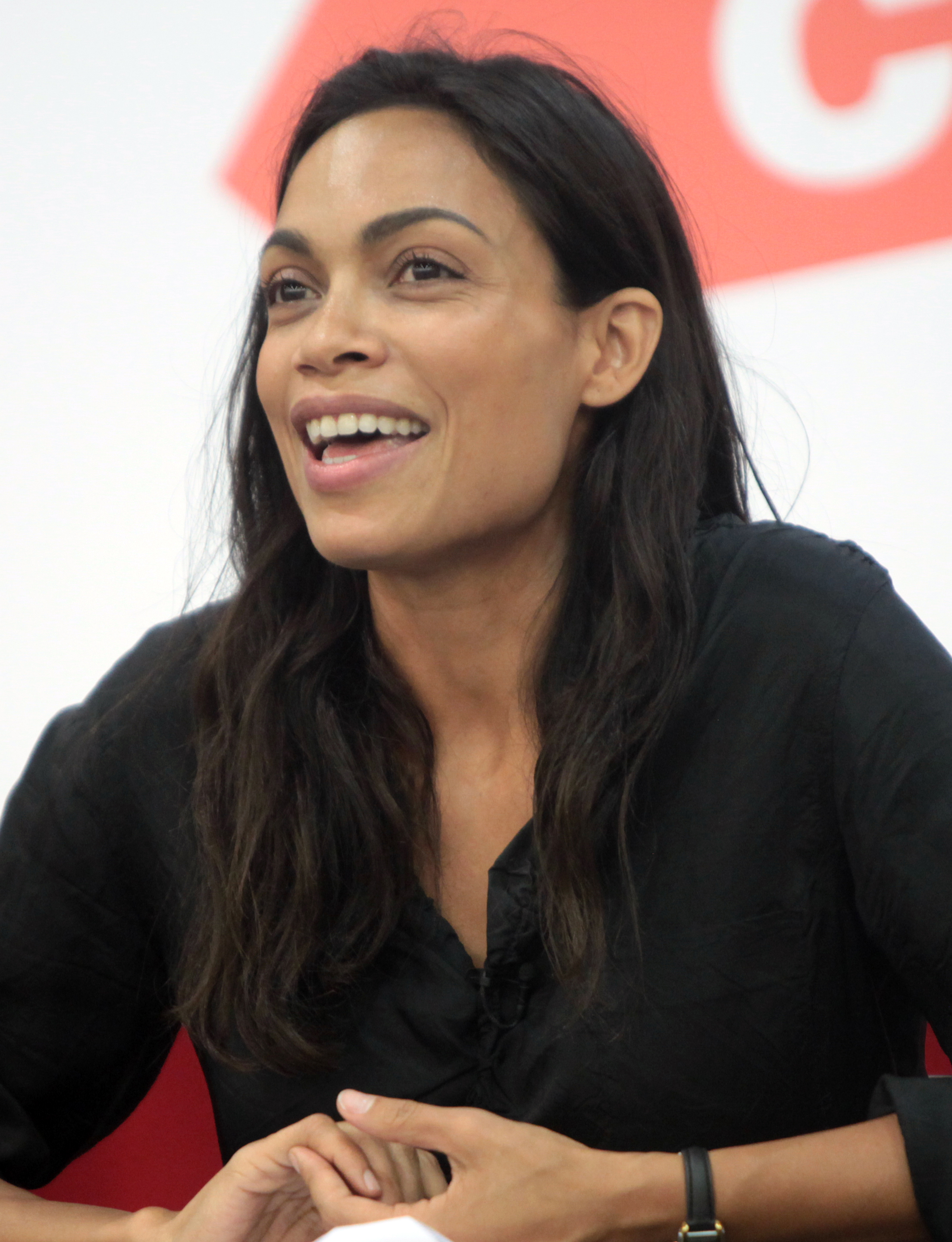
Rosario Dawson

Claire Temple (portrayed by Rosario Dawson) is a former nurse from Hell's Kitchen who joins Wing's dojo.

Dawson reprises her role from previous Marvel Netflix series.

=== Harold Meachum ===
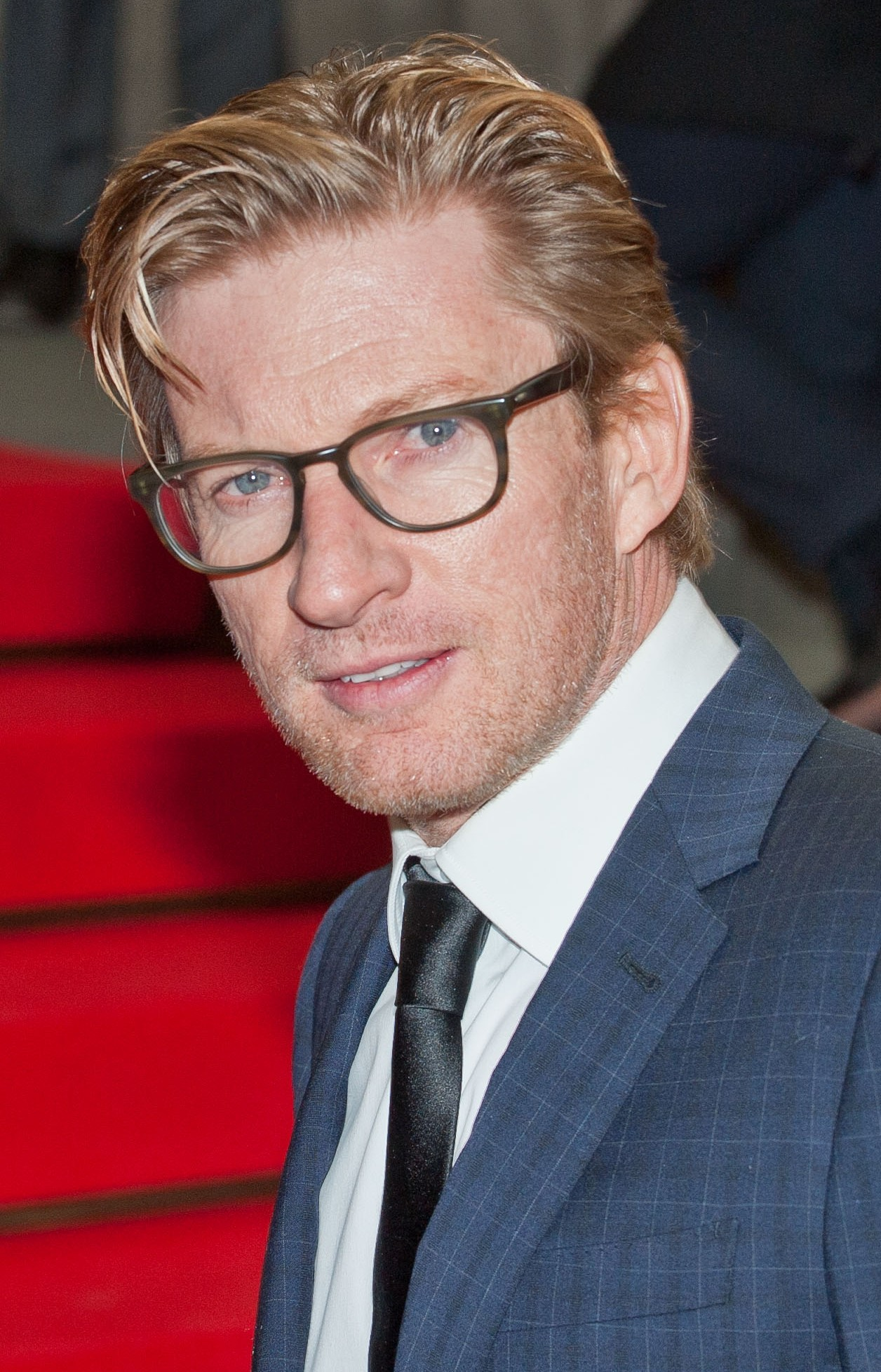
David Wenham

Harold Meachum (portrayed by David Wenham) is a ruthless corporate leader and co-founder of Rand Enterprises who was partners with Rand's parents at the time of their deaths.

Regarding Harold's relationship with his children, Joy and Ward, Wenham said the dynamic between the three of them "is complex, to say the least. It's multilayered, it's multidimensional, it's surprising and it's forever changing, depending on the circumstances."

=== Misty Knight ===
Mercedes "Misty" Knight (portrayed by Simone Missick) is a Harlem NYPD Detective with a strong sense of justice, and an ally of Rand and Wing.

Missick reprises her role from previous Marvel Netflix series.

=== Mary Walker ===
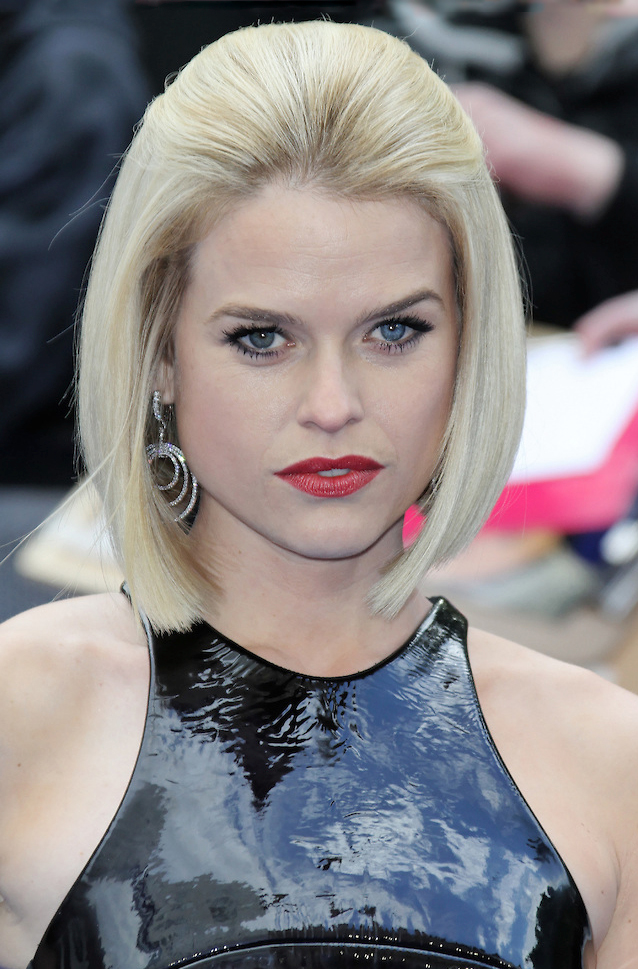
Alice Eve

Mary Walker (portrayed by Alice Eve) is a woman with a split personality.

Eve was cast in the role in December 2017.

== Recurring characters ==
The following is a list of guest characters that have recurring roles throughout the series. The characters are listed by the MCU media or season in which they first appeared.

=== Introduced in other TV series ===
==== Darryl ====
Darryl (portrayed by Marquis Rodriguez) is a student at Wing's dojo. Rodriguez reprises his role from Luke Cage.

==== Gao ====
Gao (portrayed by Wai Ching Ho) is an accomplished woman and former ally of Wilson Fisk with her own heroin trade in Hell's Kitchen who has connections with The Hand. Ho reprises her role from Daredevil.

=== Introduced in season one ===
==== Wendell Rand ====
Wendell Rand (portrayed by David Furr) is Danny's father and co-founder of Rand Enterprises.

==== Megan ====
Megan (portrayed by Barrett Doss) is a secretary to Danny Rand and the Meachums at Rand Enterprises.

==== Kyle ====
Kyle (portrayed by Alex Wyse) is Harold Meachum's personal assistant.

==== Kevin Singleton ====
Kevin Singleton (portrayed by Ramon Fernandez) is Harold Meachum's loyal bodyguard.

==== Lawrence Wilkins ====
Lawrence Wilkins (portrayed by Clifton Davis) is a member of the Rand Enterprises board of directors.

==== Donald Hooper ====
Donald Hooper (portrayed by John Sanders) is a member of the Rand Enterprises board of directors.

==== Maria Rodriguez ====
Maria Rodriguez (portrayed by Elise Santora) is a member of the Rand Enterprises board of directors.

=== Introduced in season two ===
==== Bethany ====
Bethany (portrayed by Natalie Smith) is the sponsor of Ward Meachum's NA group and is in a sexual relationship with him.

==== BB ====
BB (portrayed by Giullian Yao Gioiello) is a member of Ryhno's gang who sympathizes with Colleen.

==== Crank ====
Crank (portrayed by Sky Lakota-Lynch) former member of Ryhno's gang. Later becomes the co leader his own cult killing many including BB and Ryhno.

==== Rhyno ====
Rhyno (portrayed by Jason Lai) is the leader of the local China Town district gang.

==== Torx ====
Torx (portrayed by Jowin Marie Batoon) is a member of Ryhno's gang.

==== Hex ====
Hex (portrayed by Sydney Mae Diaz) is a member of Ryhno's gang.

==== Sherry Yang ====
Sherry Yang (portrayed by Christine Toy Johnson) is the wife of Hai-Qing Yang. She becomes the leader of the Yangsi Gonshi following her husband's death.

==== Sam Chung ====
Sam Chung (portrayed by James Chen) is a member of Bayard and a friend of Colleen Wing.

==== Chen Wu ====
Chen Wu (portrayed by Fernando Chien) is a high-ranking member of the Golden Tigers. Based on the comic character who appeared in Iron Fist #8 (October 1976).

== Guest characters ==
The following is a supplementary list of guest stars that appear in lesser roles or make significant cameo appearances. The characters are listed by the MCU media or season in which they first appeared.

=== Introduced in other TV series ===
- Jeri Hogarth (portrayed by Carrie-Anne Moss; first appears in season one): An attorney who helps Rand once he returns to New York. Loeb noted that "Carrie-Anne obviously lives in a different kind of world [from the optimistic Danny], and so being able to see those two worlds collide is just the beginning of the many obstacles that he goes through."
- Thembi Wallace (portrayed by Tijuana Ricks; first appears in season one): A reporter from for WJBP-TV.
- Shirley Benson (portrayed by Suzanne H. Smart; first appears in season one): An administrator at Metro-General Hospital and Temple's former boss.
- Donnie Chang (portrayed by Andrew Pang; first appears in season two): A detective of the NYPD's 29th Precinct working undercover as a Golden Tiger gang member.
- Turk Barrett (portrayed by Rob Morgan; first appears in season two): A minor criminal who sells guns.

=== Introduced in season one ===
- Heather Rand (portrayed by Victoria Haynes): Danny's mother.
- Shannon (portrayed by Esau Pritchett): The chief of security at Rand Enterprises who is loyal to Ward Meachum.
- Paul Edmonds (portrayed by Murray Bartlett): A psychiatrist at the mental hospital where Rand is first sent. Based on the comic character who appeared in The Avengers #227 (January 1983).
- Caleb (portrayed by Donte Grey): A student at Wing's dojo.
- Craig Geraghty as the ringmaster of an underground fight club.
- Hai-Qing Yang (portrayed by Henry Yuk): The leader of the Yangsi Gonshi triad whose pier was bought out by Joy Meachum.
- Becca Woo (portrayed by Samantha Herrera): One of Wing's students who trains to become a doctor with the help of The Hand.
- Jim Pierce (portrayed by Jay Hieron): One of the fighters that Colleen Wing takes on in the cage match.
- Radovan Bernivig (portrayed by Olek Krupa): A chemist who creates a synthetic heroin used by The Hand.
- Sandi Ann (portrayed by Shirine Babb): A Rand Enterprises employee who helps Danny with lab work.
- Sophia (portrayed by Jeanna de Waal): A sales representative for The Hand at Rand Enterprises, selling their synthetic heroin throughout New York.
- Lei Kung (portrayed by Hoon Lee): Rand's mentor in K'un-Lun and Davos' father.
- Andrei Veznikov (portrayed by Nikita Bogolyubov): A Russian butcher who fights with his brother Grigori for The Hand.
- Grigori Veznikov (portrayed by Stan Demidoff): A Russian butcher who fights with his brother Andrei for The Hand.
- Bride of Nine Spiders (portrayed by Jane Kim): An arachnologist warrior who fights for The Hand. Based on the comic character who first appeared in The Immortal Iron Fist #8 (October 2007).
- Scythe (portrayed by David Sakurai): A skilled Japanese mercenary who fights for The Hand. Based on the comic character who appeared in Marvel Premiere #16 (July 1974).
- Zhou Cheng (portrayed by Lewis Tan): A servant of Ch'i-Lin who is tasked to protect Madame Gao's heroin factory in Anzhou, China. He proficiently uses the Drunken Fist martial art style. Tan originally auditioned for the role of Danny Rand.

Stan Lee makes a cameo appearance through an on-set photograph, the same seen in previous Marvel Netflix series, as NYPD Captain Irving Forbush.

=== Introduced in season two ===
- Albert (portrayed by James Hiroyuki Liao): A friend and fellow employee of Danny's at Royal Al Moving.
- Henry Yip (portrayed by Chil Kong): The owner of the Silver Lotus who is harassed by the Golden Tigers for protection money.
- Spokes (portrayed by Jason Ng and Lenny Cruz): A member of Ryhno's gang.
- Wiz (portrayed by Nate Hitpas): A member of Ryhno's gang.
- Chain (portrayed by Micah Karns): A member of Ryhno's gang. As his name implies, he utilizes a chain when he fights.
- Crank (portrayed by Sky Lakota-Lynch): An unstable member of Ryhno's gang who betrays Ryhno.
- Mika Prada (portrayed by Julee Cerda): A wealthy socialite and rival to Joy Meachum.
- Yü-Ti (portrayed by James Saito): A member of the Order of the Crane Mother.
- Priya (portrayed by Gita Reddy): A member of the Order of the Crane Mother and Davos' mother.
- Liu (portrayed by Andrew Cao): Sherry Yang's security chief and member of the Yangsi Gnoshi.
- Aiko (portrayed by Jean Tree): One of the Crane Sisters who aids Davos in stealing the Iron Fist from Danny.
- Avalon (portrayed by Lori Laing): One of the Crane Sisters who aids Davos in stealing the Iron Fist from Danny.
- D. K. (portrayed by Lauren Mary Kim): One of the Crane Sisters who aids Davos in stealing the Iron Fist from Danny.
- Ho (portrayed by Marcus Ho): The leader of the Golden Tigers triad.
- James Wong (portrayed by Jeff Kim): An accountant working for the Yangsi Gonshi.
- Frank Choi (portrayed by Les J.N. Mau): Henry Yip's cousin and former member of the Golden Tigers.

== See also ==
- Daredevil cast and characters
- Jessica Jones cast and characters
- Luke Cage cast and characters
- The Defenders cast and characters
