= Marvel's Netflix television series =

2015–2019 superhero streaming shows

- Pentaptych promotional poster for the five individual series with their respective main characters
- Genre: Superhero
- Based on: Characters published by Marvel Comics
- Starring: See below
- Country of origin: United States
- Original language: English
- No. of seasons: 13 (across 6 series)
- No. of episodes: 161

Production
- Executive producers: Alan Fine; Stan Lee; Joe Quesada; Jim Chory; Jeph Loeb
- Running time: 41–69 minutes
- Production companies: ABC Studios; Marvel Television

Original release
- Network: Netflix
- Release: April 10, 2015 – June 14, 2019

Related
- Daredevil: Born Again; The Punisher: One Last Kill

Marvel's Netflix television series are a set of interconnected American television series created for the streaming service Netflix, based on characters that appear in publications by Marvel Comics. Produced by Marvel Television and ABC Studios, they are set in the Marvel Cinematic Universe (MCU), sharing continuity with the franchise's films and other television series. Head of Marvel Television Jeph Loeb revealed the group of shows were known internally as the "Marvel Street-Level Heroes" or "Marvel Knights" series.

A deal between Marvel and Netflix to produce several interconnected series was announced in November 2013, with the individual series Daredevil (2015–2018), Jessica Jones (2015–2019), Luke Cage (2016–2018), and Iron Fist (2017–2018) culminating in the crossover miniseries The Defenders (2017). A spin-off from Daredevil, The Punisher (2017–2019), was ordered in April 2016. The series were all filmed in New York State, forming the state's largest television production commitment across 161 episodes. They star Charlie Cox as Matt Murdock / Daredevil, Krysten Ritter as Jessica Jones, Mike Colter as Luke Cage, and Finn Jones as Danny Rand / Iron Fist, who all star together in The Defenders, as well as Jon Bernthal as Frank Castle / Punisher. Many actors have roles across the different series, including Rosario Dawson who signed a special deal to portray Claire Temple.

The series are believed to have generated strong viewership for Netflix, which did not release exact viewership details at the time, and received positive reviews for their casts and darker take on the MCU. There were some common criticisms of the series, such as for their pacing. Netflix had cancelled all of the series by February 2019, when Marvel's parent company Disney was preparing its own streaming service, Disney+. The series were all removed from Netflix on March 1, 2022, after Disney regained the licenses for them, and they began streaming on Disney+ from March 16, where they were collected under the title "The Defenders Saga".

Contractually, Marvel had to wait two years before they could use the characters without Netflix. Vincent D'Onofrio and Cox were the first actors to reprise their roles in Marvel Studios-produced MCU projects, starting in December 2021. A new Daredevil series, titled Daredevil: Born Again, premiered in 2025 on Disney+, with Cox, D'Onofrio, Bernthal, and other Daredevil cast members returning. Ritter, Colter, and Jones returned for subsequent seasons. Additionally, The Punisher: One Last Kill, a Marvel Television Special Presentation television special starring Bernthal, was released in 2026.

== Development ==
By October 2013, Marvel Television was preparing four drama series and a miniseries, totaling 60 episodes, to present to video on demand services and cable providers, with Netflix, Amazon, and WGN America expressing interest. In November 2013, Marvel's parent company Disney was set to provide Netflix with live-action series based on Daredevil, Jessica Jones, Iron Fist, and Luke Cage, leading up to a crossover miniseries based on the Defenders. Disney CEO Bob Iger explained that Disney had chosen Netflix to air the shows when they realized that the audience of the streaming service would provide a way to "grow the popularity of the characters".

Marvel Television head Jeph Loeb later stated that Marvel was not "interested in making four pilots and then hoping someday that they could all get together. Netflix really understood what it is we wanted to do. They're very open to directors that might not have that same opportunity in broadcast television. The notion of having all 13 episodes at one time, particularly in serialized storytelling, is very appealing." Loeb also added that the four characters "lent [themselves] to a world" due to their relationships and shared locale of New York City in the comics but that the individual series would be different from one another because "the characters have different issues, different problems, different feelings about them". Loeb gave as an example the Marvel Cinematic Universe (MCU) films Captain America: The Winter Soldier and Guardians of the Galaxy (both 2014), on which he said, "I cannot think of two films that are more different in tone" than them, and yet "they feel very Marvel ... like, 'Oh, it is still the same universe that I'm in.'" Despite being branded as "Netflix Originals", the series were licensed to Netflix from Disney.

Marvel's Joe Quesada confirmed in April 2014 that the Netflix series would be set within the MCU. Loeb explained that "within the Marvel universe there are thousands of heroes of all shapes and sizes, but the Avengers are here to save the universe and Daredevil is here to save the neighborhood ... It does take place in the Marvel Cinematic Universe. It's all connected. But that doesn't necessarily mean that we would look up in the sky and see [Iron Man]. It's just a different part of New York that we have not yet seen in the Marvel movies." In January 2015, Netflix COO Ted Sarandos said Netflix planned to release a Marvel series approximately a year apart from each other after Daredevil's April 2015 release. A year later, Sarandos noted that the release schedules of the Marvel Netflix series are dependent on the "long production times and long post times. In some cases, when we have characters crossover, it makes it more difficult to manage production. It's not the goal to put out more than one or two [each] year ... The complex one is really The Defenders. The Defenders' production schedule will determine a lot of the season 2 and 3 output of those shows." He also noted on potential spin-offs that "all the characters in the universe could also spin out" into their own series at some point, with Netflix ordering The Punisher, a spin-off from Daredevil, in April 2016.

In May 2015, after starring as Claire Temple in the first season of Daredevil, Rosario Dawson signed with Marvel to return for the second season of the series as part of an "exclusive TV deal" that also allowed her to appear in any other Marvel Netflix series as Claire Temple. Dawson went on to appear in all of the series except The Punisher, linking them together similarly to Samuel L. Jackson's Nick Fury in the MCU films. Dawson explained that she signed on with Marvel each year for a certain number of episodes, and found out which series the episodes were for closer to the time of filming. Sarandos stated in July 2016 that Netflix was trying to close the gap between releases of Marvel seasons and was considering expanding to new series, but would always prioritize the quality of the shows over having more series and more releases per year. That month, Marvel and Netflix committed to completing production on 135 episodes by the end of 2017, making the deal the largest television production commitment in New York State. Production for the different series engaged 500 local vendors and small businesses for various stages of development and required over 14,000 production-related hires. Sarandos later stated that the original deal with Marvel was "the biggest deal in the history of television. No one will ever touch it."

== Series ==
Netflix television series from Marvel Television
Series	Season	Episodes	Originally released	Showrunner(s)
Daredevil	1	13	April 10, 2015	Steven S. DeKnight
Daredevil	2	13	March 18, 2016	Douglas Petrie and Marco Ramirez
Daredevil	3	13	October 19, 2018	Erik Oleson
Jessica Jones	1	13	November 20, 2015	Melissa Rosenberg
Jessica Jones	2	13	March 8, 2018	Melissa Rosenberg
Jessica Jones	3	13	June 14, 2019	Melissa Rosenberg and Scott Reynolds
Luke Cage	1	13	September 30, 2016	Cheo Hodari Coker
Luke Cage	2	13	June 22, 2018	Cheo Hodari Coker
Iron Fist	1	13	March 17, 2017	Scott Buck
Iron Fist	2	10	September 7, 2018	M. Raven Metzner
The Defenders	1	8	August 18, 2017	Marco Ramirez
The Punisher	1	13	November 17, 2017	Steve Lightfoot
The Punisher	2	13	January 18, 2019	Steve Lightfoot

=== Daredevil (2015–2018) ===
Lawyer-by-day Matt Murdock uses his heightened senses from being blinded as a young boy to fight crime at night on the streets of Hell's Kitchen as Daredevil, juxtaposed with the rise of crime lord Wilson Fisk. Murdock eventually crosses paths with Frank Castle / Punisher, a vigilante with far deadlier methods, and sees the return of his old girlfriend, Elektra Natchios. When Wilson Fisk is released from prison, Murdock must decide between hiding from the world or embracing his life as a hero vigilante.

In December 2013, Marvel announced that Drew Goddard would be the executive producer and showrunner for Daredevil, and would write and direct the first episode, though at the end of May 2014, Goddard was no longer set to be the showrunner for the series and was replaced by Steven S. DeKnight. Goddard, who wrote the first two episodes, remained with the show as an executive producer. A few days later, Charlie Cox was cast as Daredevil. A second season was ordered on April 21, 2015, with Douglas Petrie and Marco Ramirez taking over as showrunners from DeKnight, who could not return to the series due to a prior commitment. A third season was ordered in July 2016, with Erik Oleson taking over as showrunner of the series in October 2017.

The first season, which debuted in its entirety on April 10, 2015, features references to The Avengers (2012) and mentions Carl "Crusher" Creel, a character from the MCU series Agents of S.H.I.E.L.D. The insignia for the Iron Fist antagonist Steel Serpent is also seen in the season. The second season, which premiered on March 18, 2016, features the motorcycle gang Dogs of Hell, who also appeared on Agents of S.H.I.E.L.D., along with numerous references to the events of the first season of Jessica Jones. Jon Bernthal co-stars as Frank Castle / Punisher, before headlining his own series, while Michelle Hurd and Carrie-Anne Moss reprise their roles of Samantha Reyes and Jeri Hogarth from Jessica Jones. The third season was released on October 19, 2018.

=== Jessica Jones (2015–2019) ===
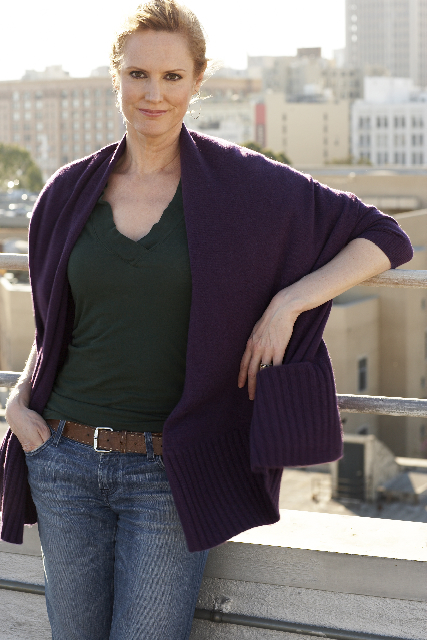
Melissa Rosenberg is Jessica Jones' creator and showrunner.

Jessica Jones has post-traumatic stress disorder, so she opens her own detective agency to help people. She begins to put her life back together after her encounter with Kilgrave, taking on a new case that makes her reluctantly confront her past.

In November 2013, Melissa Rosenberg was announced as the writer and executive producer of the series, and the following March, Loeb stated that filming would begin after Daredevil. In December 2014, Krysten Ritter was cast as Jessica Jones in the series. A second season was ordered on January 17, 2016, and a third on April 12, 2018. Scott Reynolds joined Rosenberg as co-showrunner for the third season.

The first season, which debuted in its entirety on November 20, 2015, features references to the events and characters of The Avengers and co-stars Mike Colter as Luke Cage before he headlined his own series. Rosario Dawson reprises her Daredevil role of Claire Temple, as does Royce Johnson in his role of Brett Mahoney. The second season, which was released on March 8, 2018, sees Elden Henson reprise his role of Franklin "Foggy" Nelson, as well as Rob Morgan as Turk Barrett, and Tijuana Ricks as Thembi Wallace. The third season was released on June 14, 2019. Both the second and third seasons reference the events of Captain America: Civil War (2016), including mentions of the Raft prison.

=== Luke Cage (2016–2018) ===
When a sabotaged experiment gives him super strength and unbreakable skin, Luke Cage becomes a fugitive attempting to rebuild his life in Harlem and must soon confront his past and fight a battle for the heart of his city. After clearing his name, Cage becomes a hero and celebrity in Harlem, only to encounter a new threat that makes him confront the line between hero and villain.

Colter reprises his role as Luke Cage in his own series. In March 2014, Loeb stated that the series would begin filming after Iron Fist, being the fourth of the individual series. By March 2015, it was instead slated to be the third of the individual series, beginning production after Jessica Jones. The series was switched with Iron Fist after the positive reception Luke Cage received on Jessica Jones, becoming that series' breakout star and Marvel wanting to "follow the momentum". Also in March, Cheo Hodari Coker was announced as showrunner and executive producer of the series. A second season was ordered on December 3, 2016.

The first season, which premiered on September 30, 2016, features references to The Avengers, the second season of Daredevil, the first season of Jessica Jones, and a flier for Colleen Wing's martial arts class mentions Justin Hammer, Wilson Fisk, and Frank Castle. Reprising their roles in the season are Dawson as Temple, Morgan as Barrett, Rachael Taylor as Trish Walker, Stephen Rider as Blake Tower, Parisa Fitz-Henley as Reva Connors, and Danny Johnson as Ben Donovan. The second season, which premiered on June 22, 2018, features a reference to Detective Brigid O'Reilly from the MCU series Cloak & Dagger. Finn Jones, Jessica Henwick, and Henson reprise their roles as Danny Rand, Colleen Wing, and Foggy Nelson in the season.

=== Iron Fist (2017–2018) ===
Danny Rand returns to New York City, after being missing for fifteen years, to reclaim his family's company. However, when a threat emerges, Rand must choose between his family's legacy and his duties as the Iron Fist.

In March 2014, Loeb stated that the series would begin filming after Jessica Jones as the third of the individual series. By March 2015, it was expected to be the fourth of the individual series, entering production following Luke Cage. The series was switched with Luke Cage after the positive reception Luke Cage received on Jessica Jones, becoming that series' breakout star and Marvel wanting to "follow the momentum". In December 2015, Marvel announced that Scott Buck would serve as showrunner and executive producer of the series. In February 2016, Finn Jones was cast as Rand. A second season was revealed to be in development in July 2017, with Raven Metzner announced as the new showrunner for the season, replacing Buck.

The first season, which premiered on March 17, 2017, makes references to the events of The Avengers, the Hulk, Stark Industries, Jessica Jones, Daredevil, Luke Cage, and Seagate Prison, and mentions the Dogs of Hell biker gang, New York Bulletin editor-in-chief Mitchell Ellison and reporter Karen Page, Roxxon Oil, and Midland Circle. Events from the second season of Daredevil are also noted throughout. Reprising their roles in the season are Moss as Hogarth, Dawson as Temple, Wai Ching Ho as Gao, Marquis Rodriguez as Darryl, Tijuana Ricks as Thembi Wallace, and Suzanne H. Smart as Shirley Benson. The second season, which was released on September 7, 2018, sees Simone Missick reprise her role as Misty Knight, and makes reference to Sokovia.

=== The Defenders (2017) ===
The superheroes Daredevil, Jessica Jones, Luke Cage, and Iron Fist team up in New York City.

The Defenders sees Cox, Ritter, Colter, and Jones reprise their roles as Matt Murdock / Daredevil, Jessica Jones, Luke Cage, and Danny Rand / Iron Fist, respectively, from the previous television series. In March 2014, Loeb stated that the miniseries would begin filming after Iron Fist. In April 2016, Marvel announced that Douglas Petrie and Marco Ramirez would act as showrunners for The Defenders. However, by the start of filming in New York City in October 2016, Petrie had left the series as co-showrunner. Filming concluded in March 2017. The eight-episode event premiered on August 18, 2017.

The miniseries also sees many supporting characters from the individual series reprise their roles, including, Deborah Ann Woll, Henson, Scott Glenn, Élodie Yung, Eka Darville, Moss, Taylor, Simone Missick, Jessica Henwick, Dawson, Ho, Ramón Rodríguez, Peter McRobbie, Morgan, Amy Rutberg, Susan Varon, and Nichole Yannetty as Karen Page, Foggy Nelson, Stick, Elektra Natchios, Malcolm Ducasse, Jeri Hogarth, Trish Walker, Misty Knight, Colleen Wing, Claire Temple, Gao, Bakuto, Lantom, Turk Barrett, Marci Stahl, Josie and Nicole, respectively. Midland Circle, which was referenced in previous Netflix series, is revealed to be an operation of the Hand, who bought the building to search for the life substance hidden beneath the property. The miniseries also references the events of The Avengers.

=== The Punisher (2017–2019) ===
Frank Castle is haunted and hunted after the murder of his family and becomes a vigilante known in the criminal underworld as "the Punisher" who aims to fight crime by any means necessary.

By January 2016, ahead of the debut of Bernthal as armed vigilante Frank Castle / Punisher in the second season of Daredevil, Netflix was in "very early development" on a spin-off series and was looking for a showrunner. The series would be centered on Bernthal as Castle and was described as a stand-alone series, outside of the series leading up to The Defenders. Loeb implied that Marvel Television had not instigated the development of the spin-off and was focusing on making "the best 13 episodes of Daredevil season two" at the time but did say, "I'm never going to discourage a network from looking at one of our characters and encouraging us to do more... If we are lucky enough that through the writing, through the direction, through the actor that people want to see more of that person, terrific." In April 2016, Marvel and Netflix ordered The Punisher, along with confirming Bernthal's involvement and naming Steve Lightfoot as showrunner. Filming began in Brooklyn, New York in October 2016, and concluded in April 2017. A second season was ordered on December 12, 2017.

In the first season, which was released on November 17, 2017, Woll and Morgan reprise their roles as Karen Page and Turk Barrett, respectively. The second season was released on January 18, 2019.

== Recurring cast and characters ==
List indicators
This section includes characters who have appeared in at least two series and as a member of the main cast for at least one of those.
- A dark grey cell indicates the character was not in the series.
- An ^{F} indicates the character appears in a film.
- A ^{G} indicates a guest appearance in the series.
- An ^{MS} indicates the character appears in a Marvel Studios television series.
- An ^{R} indicates a recurring role in the series.
- An ^{SP} indicates the character appears in a Marvel Studios Special Presentation.
- A ^{V} indicates a voice-only role.

Character	Daredevil	Jessica Jones	Luke Cage	Iron Fist	The Defenders	The Punisher
Bakuto				Ramón Rodríguez	Ramón Rodríguez	
Luke Cage^{MS}		Mike Colter	Mike Colter		Mike Colter	
Frank Castle Punisher^{F} ^{MS} ^{SP}	Jon Bernthal					Jon Bernthal
Malcolm Ducasse		Eka Darville			Eka Darville	
Jeri Hogarth	Carrie-Anne Moss^{G}	Carrie-Anne Moss		Carrie-Anne Moss^{G}	Carrie-Anne Moss^{G}	
Jessica Jones^{MS}		Krysten Ritter			Krysten Ritter	
Mercedes "Misty" Knight			Simone Missick	Simone Missick	Simone Missick	
Matt Murdock Daredevil^{F} ^{MS}	Charlie Cox				Charlie Cox	
Elektra Natchios^{MS}	Élodie Yung				Élodie Yung	
Franklin "Foggy" Nelson^{MS}	Elden Henson	Elden Henson^{G}	Elden Henson^{G}		Elden Henson	
Karen Page^{MS}	Deborah Ann Woll				Deborah Ann Woll	Deborah Ann Woll
Danny Rand Iron Fist^{MS}			Finn Jones	Finn Jones	Finn Jones	
Stick	Scott Glenn^{R}				Scott Glenn	
Claire Temple^{F}	Rosario Dawson	Rosario Dawson^{G}	Rosario Dawson	Rosario Dawson	Rosario Dawson	
Blake Tower	Stephen Rider		Stephen Rider^{G}			
Patricia "Trish" Walker Hellcat		Rachael Taylor	Rachael Taylor^{G}^{V}		Rachael Taylor	
Colleen Wing			Jessica Henwick	Jessica Henwick	Jessica Henwick	

== Music ==
Albums for Netflix series
Series	Title	U.S. release date	Length	Composer(s)	Labels	Ref.
Daredevil	Original Soundtrack Album	April 27, 2015	41:45	John Paesano	Hollywood Records; Marvel Music	
Daredevil	Season 2 (Original Soundtrack Album)	July 15, 2016	50:49	John Paesano	Hollywood Records; Marvel Music	
Daredevil	Season 3 (Original Soundtrack Album)	October 19, 2018	75:03	John Paesano	Hollywood Records; Marvel Music	
Jessica Jones	Original Soundtrack	June 3, 2016	59:53	Sean Callery	Hollywood Records; Marvel Music	
Jessica Jones	Season 2 (Original Soundtrack)	March 16, 2018	51:75	Sean Callery	Hollywood Records; Marvel Music	
Jessica Jones	Season 3 (Original Soundtrack)	July 19, 2019	57:51	Sean Callery	Hollywood Records; Marvel Music	
Luke Cage	Original Soundtrack Album	October 7, 2016	95:09	Adrian Younge and Ali Shaheed Muhammad	Hollywood Records; Marvel Music	
Luke Cage	Season 2 (Original Soundtrack Album)	June 22, 2018	90:21	Adrian Younge and Ali Shaheed Muhammad	Hollywood Records; Marvel Music	
Iron Fist	Original Soundtrack	March 17, 2017	62:00	Trevor Morris	Hollywood Records; Marvel Music	
Iron Fist	Season 2 (Original Soundtrack)	September 7, 2018	39:12	Robert Lydecker	Hollywood Records; Marvel Music	
The Defenders	Original Soundtrack Album	August 17, 2017	49:15	John Paesano	Hollywood Records; Marvel Music	
The Punisher	Original Soundtrack	November 17, 2017	42:52	Tyler Bates	Hollywood Records; Marvel Music	
The Punisher	Season 2 (Original Soundtrack)	January 18, 2019	51:52	Tyler Bates	Hollywood Records; Marvel Music	

In October 2016, Mondo released a vinyl soundtrack album for the first season of Luke Cage. It is pressed on yellow vinyl and comes with collectible artwork by Matthew Woodson. The day after the album was released, Mondo announced that its entire initial pressing had already sold out. A month later, the company released vinyl soundtracks for the first seasons of Daredevil and Jessica Jones, pressed on red and purple vinyl, respectively. Each release was limited to 3000 copies, also comes with collectible artwork by Woodson, and was made available both online and at the Alamo Drafthouse Cinema in Brooklyn, New York. Mondo held an event at the House of Wax bar in Brooklyn on November 9, selling copies of all three albums to a live DJ set by Adrian Younge. Additionally, Mondo released screen print posters of Woodson's art. Mondo released a vinyl soundtrack for the first season of Iron Fist in August 2017, pressed on green and black vinyl. The release once again included original art by Woodson, which was also released as a poster. In March 2018, Mondo released a vinyl soundtrack album for The Defenders featuring collectible art by Johnny Dombrowski. The first disc is pressed on half-red, half-yellow vinyl and the second disc is pressed on half-purple, half-green vinyl.

== Reception ==
Critical response of Marvel's Netflix television series
Title	Season	Rotten Tomatoes	Metacritic
Daredevil	1	99% (72 reviews)	75 (22 reviews)
Daredevil	2	81% (57 reviews)	68 (13 reviews)
Daredevil	3	97% (67 reviews)	71 (6 reviews)
Jessica Jones	1	94% (81 reviews)	81 (32 reviews)
Jessica Jones	2	82% (89 reviews)	70 (19 reviews)
Jessica Jones	3	73% (40 reviews)	65 (7 reviews)
Luke Cage	1	90% (72 reviews)	79 (30 reviews)
Luke Cage	2	86% (63 reviews)	64 (13 reviews)
Iron Fist	1	20% (85 reviews)	37 (21 reviews)
Iron Fist	2	56% (48 reviews)	39 (6 reviews)
The Defenders	1	78% (100 reviews)	63 (30 reviews)
The Punisher	1	68% (82 reviews)	55 (20 reviews)
The Punisher	2	61% (38 reviews)	58 (6 reviews)

With the release of the second season of Daredevil, Brian Lowery of Variety felt the Netflix series "have already leapfrogged ABC's forays into the Marvel universe in terms of their appeal, in part by tapping into the avid fan base that supports pay models and doesn't need to be spoon-fed plot points. In the process, they have demonstrated that it's possible to deliver a credible superhero show without a lot of pyrotechnics". Following the release of Jessica Jones, David Priest at c|net wrote that the series rescues "Marvel from itself ... Jessica Jones takes big steps forward in terms of theme, craft and diversity. It's a good story first, and a superhero show second. And for the first time, the MCU seems like it matters." For Paul Tassi and Erik Kain of Forbes, watching the series made them question the MCU, with Kain feeling that the "morally complex, violent, dark world of Jessica Jones has no place in the MCU ... right now, the MCU is holding back shows like Jessica Jones and Daredevil, while those shows are contributing absolutely nothing to the MCU." Tassi went so far as to wonder what "the point of the Marvel Cinematic Universe" is, lamenting the lack of major crossovers in the franchise and saying that Jessica Jones is "so far removed from the world of The Avengers, it might as well not be in the same universe at all ... [I] really don't understand the point of [the MCU] if they're going to keep everything within it separated off in these little boxes". Conversely, Eric Francisco of Inverse called Jessica Jones's lack of overt connections to the MCU "the show's chief advantage. Besides demonstrating how physically wide open the MCU's scope really is, Jessica Jones also proves the MCU's thematic durability."

After the release of the first season of Luke Cage, The Atlantic's David Sims highlighted the pacing of Marvel's Netflix series, a common complaint from critics of all the series, stating, "After two seasons of Daredevil, one of Jessica Jones, and now one of Luke Cage, the Netflix model feels fundamentally flawed, encouraging the kind of molasses-slow plotting comic books are designed to eschew. The problem isn't that these shows are bad, necessarily... But they all take far too long to get going, by which point many viewers will have already tuned out." He felt one of the problems was the fact that Netflix does not rely on viewers tuning into a particular series as broadcast series do each week, but rather subscribers who, if they lose interest, "can take as long as they want to catch up... as long as they keep paying their subscription fee every month." The Netflix series are also afforded the opportunity to explore elements in more detail, with Sims noting "A lot of this detail [is] good, but it could have been considerably compressed—none of the Marvel Netflix series, so far, would have lost much by being squeezed into 10 episodes, or even 8. If Netflix shaved the 60-minute running time down quite a bit, it would likely inspire more economical—and better—storytelling from its shows." Sims concluded by saying, "What's most frustrating of all is that Netflix isn't getting rid of this approach anytime soon. Daredevil season three, Jessica Jones season two, Iron Fist, and The Punisher are all on their way, and each will follow the same 13-episode structure... The only respite may come in the form of The Defenders, a planned crossover series... over the course of just eight episodes. Who knows? The show might even surprise viewers and explain its villain's motivations within the first hour. Until then, fans will be stuck needlessly giving over entire days to these series, while others are deterred from watching at all."

In her review for the first season of Iron Fist, Allison Keene of Collider spoke of the Marvel Netflix series' more grounded tone "than what we typically expect from a superhero show (like DC's candy-colored [Arrowverse] on The CW)", which misses a key element expected of superhero series: "this should be fantastical entertainment". With The Defenders, Jeff Jansen of Entertainment Weekly felt many improvements were made in response to the common complaints the previous seasons received. He said, "The Defenders is far from perfect. But it's an enjoyable superhero adventure distinguished by improvements and innovations that I hope Marvel will carry forward. Shorter seasons. More team-ups. Fewer shows. Start the consolidation by letting go of Iron Fist. If Danny Rand must persist, add him to the other shows and let the stronger players carry him."

== Potential projects and crossovers ==
=== Television series ===
Netflix CCO Ted Sarandos stated in January 2016 that "all the characters in the universe" could receive their own spin-off series, and that July he added that Netflix was open to exploring the MCU beyond the Defenders series, including potential crossovers with ABC's Marvel series. Netflix vice president of original content Cindy Holland reiterated in July 2018 that there were always ongoing discussions regarding creating more spin-offs for characters from their Marvel series. That September, Loeb stated that he would like to make a Daughters of the Dragon series for Netflix, featuring Jessica Henwick's Colleen Wing and Simone Missick's Misty Knight.

=== Feature films ===
When the Marvel-Netflix deal was announced in November 2013, Iger indicated that if the characters proved popular they could go on to star in feature films. In March 2015, Loeb stated that the series would start out self-contained since "the audience needs to understand who all of these characters are and what the world is before you then start co-mingling". In September 2015, Marvel Studios' Kevin Feige said the films referencing the television series was inevitable, but "the schedules do not always quite match up to make that possible [since] by the time we start doing a movie, they'd be mid-way through a season. By the time our movie comes out, they'd be [starting the next season]."

In April 2016, Marvel Studios revealed that Alfre Woodard would appear in Captain America: Civil War (2016), having already been cast as Mariah Dillard in Luke Cage the previous year. This "raised hopes that Marvel could be uniting its film and Netflix universes", with "one of the first and strongest connections" between the two. However, Civil War writers Christopher Markus and Stephen McFeely revealed that Woodard would instead be portraying Miriam Sharpe in the film, explaining that she had been cast on the suggestion of Robert Downey Jr., and they had not learnt of her casting in Luke Cage until afterwards. This was not the first instance of actors being cast in multiple roles in the MCU, but this casting was called more "significant", and seen by many as a "disappointing" indication of "the growing divide" and "lack of more satisfying cooperation" between Marvel Studios and Marvel Television following the September 2015 corporate reshuffling of Marvel Entertainment that saw Marvel Studios become its own entity under Disney.

Eric Carroll, producer on Spider-Man: Homecoming (2017), felt with the introduction of Queens-based Spider-Man to the MCU it "would be really fun" to make mention of the Defenders based in Manhattan, adding, "it's definitely a card I would love to see played, if not sooner rather than later." In January 2017, Vincent D'Onofrio, who portrays Wilson Fisk in Daredevil, said he "would love to switch over to the movies, but I think it's pretty much been said it's not going to happen. Or at least not for a very, very long time." D'Onofrio cited Feige's previous reasoning as well as the fact that the films already had difficulty "bringing big characters in that they have to service in the writing" and adding characters from the television series would be "just too many characters" since the films were "trying to figure out already how to individualize more and at the same time keep The Avengers going". Loeb said in October that the television series do not show Avengers Tower in New York City as the films do because Marvel Television wanted to be "less specific" about their characters' relationships to the tower and indicate that "this could be on any street corner ... where you would not be able to see the tower, even though it exists".

When Feige first announced the crossover film Avengers: Infinity War (2018), he said the opportunity "certainly" exists for characters in the Netflix series to appear in that film, and actors such as Krysten Ritter of Jessica Jones expressed interest in doing this. Daredevil's Charlie Cox revealed that he and other actors with Marvel Television were contractually obliged to appear in a Marvel film if asked. Infinity War co-director Anthony Russo stated that including television characters in Infinity War would be complicated by Marvel Studios and Marvel Television having separate oversight. The "briefest consideration" to including Daredevil and Luke Cage in the film was ultimately made, but the directors stated that it was "practically impossible", and decided to just focus on crossing-over the characters from previous films instead.

== Future ==
=== Cancellations and removal from Netflix ===
In October 2018, Netflix canceled Iron Fist, with Deadline Hollywood reporting that Disney was considering reviving the series on its streaming service Disney+. Sarandos confirmed that the series were Netflix's to renew or cancel if they wished, and the company was "super happy with [the other series'] performance so far". Despite this, Luke Cage was canceled by the streamer a week after Iron Fist was. Deadline Hollywood reported there were no plans to revive the series on Disney+ as with Iron Fist. Shortly after, at the end of November 2018, Netflix canceled Daredevil, with Deadline Hollywood again reporting there was the potential for the series to be revived on Disney+. Conversely, The Hollywood Reporter felt it was unlikely the series would be revived on Disney+ and also noted the two other remaining series at the time (Jessica Jones and The Punisher) would remain on Netflix "until they run their course". Variety added that, per the original deal between Marvel and Netflix for the series, the characters cannot appear in any non-Netflix series or films for at least two years following their cancellation. Kevin A. Mayer, chairman of Walt Disney Direct-to-Consumer and International, noted that, while it had not yet been discussed, it was a possibility that Disney+ could revive the cancelled Netflix series. Netflix canceled both Jessica Jones and The Punisher on February 18, 2019. Loeb stated in August 2019 that Marvel Television had been "blindsided" by the cancellation of the series which "weren't finished yet", and the company had believed that the situation could be an end for them until they had several new series ordered by Hulu in a similar model to the original Marvel-Netflix deal. Loeb said there were future series being developed by Marvel Television that could be classified as "Marvel Street-Level Heroes" or "Marvel Knights" series just like the Marvel-Netflix series. He added, "however history's going to remember the story, all that's important to us is that we had an opportunity to change television by putting together four heroes, who then joined together in a group". Sarandos later stated that Netflix clashed with Marvel Television whenever they wanted to "make the shows bigger or better". He said Marvel Television was "thrifty" and wanted to produce the group of series "as cheaply as possible", given they were the producers of the series and would keep whatever was not spent.

All of the series were removed from Netflix on March 1, 2022, due to Netflix's license for the series ending and Disney regaining the rights. Disney opted not to have Netflix pay a large licensing fee to retain the distribution rights for the series, and instead announced that all of the series would be made available on Disney+ on March 16 in the United States, Canada, United Kingdom, Ireland, Australia, and New Zealand, and in Disney+'s other markets by the end of 2022. In the United States, revised parental controls were introduced to the service to allow the more mature content of the series to be added, similarly to the controls that already exist for other regions that have the Star content hub. The Parents Television and Media Council (PTMC), a conservative-leaning advisory group, denounced the additions of the shows to the service despite said-parental control updates, with its president Tim Winter stating that it was "wildly 'off-brand'" for Disney since the platform had been "logically marketed itself as a family-friendly streaming service". He said the move would "forever tarnish [Disney's] family friendly crown". Disney+ grouped the series together under the title "The Defenders Saga", and removed the two mentions of Netflix from each series' opening credits.

=== Integration with Marvel Studios ===
In January 2021, Feige said "never say never" to potentially reviving the series, but Marvel Studios was focused on their new Disney+ series announced at that time. He also said "everything is on the board" in terms of the characters reappearing in Marvel Studios properties, and felt there were "some great characters and actors" from the Netflix series. In December 2021, Feige revealed that any upcoming Marvel Studios projects featuring Daredevil would have Cox reprise his role as the character, with the actor first appearing in the film Spider-Man: No Way Home (2021). Henwick said Cox had known about the potential to reprise his role for Marvel Studios years prior. Additionally, D'Onofrio first reprised his role as Kingpin in the Disney+ series Hawkeye (2021).

In March 2022, a Daredevil reboot series from Marvel Studios was reported to be in development, with Feige and Chris Gary serving as producers. The series was confirmed to be in development for Disney+ in late May, with Matt Corman and Chris Ord attached as head writers and executive producers. The series, titled Daredevil: Born Again, was officially announced in July, with Cox and D'Onofrio confirmed to return. Bernthal also reprises his role in Born Again. Ahead of Cox's appearance in Echo, which released in January 2024, Marvel Studios' head of streaming Brad Winderbaum acknowledged that Marvel Studios had previously been "a little bit cagey" about what was part of their Sacred Timeline, noting how there had been the corporate divide between what Marvel Studios created and what Marvel Television created. He continued that as time has passed, Marvel Studios has begun to see "how well integrated the [Marvel Television] stories are" and personally felt "confident" in saying Daredevil was part of the Sacred Timeline. Marvel Studios began looking at the Netflix series as a more integral part to the MCU once Born Again underwent a creative overhaul in September 2023, which now served as more of a continuation from the Netflix series and saw additional Daredevil actors reprising their role. With Echo's release, all of the Netflix series were retroactively added to the MCU Disney+ timeline, and were placed primarily alongside the Phase Two and Phase Three content of the MCU.

In February 2025, Winderbaum said Born Again was envisioned as a multi-season series, and the studio was exploring and "creatively extremely excited" about trying to reintroduce the other Defenders actors. Additionally, it was announced that Bernthal would star in a Marvel Television Special Presentation, The Punisher: One Last Kill, with Reinaldo Marcus Green directing and co-writing with Bernthal. In May 2025, it was announced that Ritter would appear in the second season of Born Again; Ritter had known about her return to the role for nearly two years. Iron Fists appear in Marvel Studios Animation series: Jorani, voiced by Jona Xiao, is the Iron Fist in 1400 China that appears in Eyes of Wakanda (2025), while Kwai Jun-Fan, voiced by Allen Deng, is an alternate version of the character in the Old West in 1872 that appears in the third season of the animated series What If...? (2024).

In January 2026, Colter said there had been conversations about him reprising his role. He was willing to give fans hope about a potential return because discussions were "in a better position to see this come into fruition faster than we think", and added that he had "unfinished business" with Luke Cage. Colter appears in the second season finale of Born Again, and will return with Ritter and Jones for its third season, which will be the series' final season. Henwick said in August 2026 that she had discussed reprising her role of Colleen Wing in the season, but she and the creative team decided against this because she would not have had a large role. Henwick was happy with the character's ending in the second season of Iron Fist and only wanted to return if there was a good story reason. Dawson filmed a scene for the film Spider-Man: Brand New Day (2026) reprising her role as Claire Temple that was cut from the final film, but appears in its extended cut, [Brand New] Brand New Day. The film does feature an appearance by members of the Hand.

== See also ==
- Marvel's ABC television series
- Marvel's young adult television series
- Adventure into Fear
