= The Visitor (2022 American film) =

2022 film by Justin P. Lange

- Official release poster
- Directed by: Justin P. Lange
- Written by: Adam Mason; Simon Boyes
- Produced by: Paige Pemberton; Paul Uddo
- Starring: Finn Jones; Jessica McNamee
- Cinematography: Federico Verardi
- Edited by: Andrew Wesman
- Music by: Gavin Brivik
- Production companies: Blumhouse Television; Epix; Divide/Conquer; Bradley Pilz Productions
- Distributed by: Paramount Home Entertainment
- Release date: October 7, 2022
- Running time: 89 minutes
- Country: United States
- Language: English

The Visitor is a 2022 American psychological horror film directed by Justin P. Lange and written by Adam Mason and Simon Boyes. The film stars Finn Jones and Jessica McNamee. Jason Blum serves as an executive producer through his Blumhouse Television banner.

The film was released digitally on October 7, 2022, by Epix and Paramount Home Entertainment.

== Plot ==
When Robert and his wife move to her childhood home, he discovers an old portrait in the attic of a man who looks just like him. He soon travels down a frightening rabbit hole as he tries to discover the true identity of his mysterious doppelgänger, only to realize that every family has its own terrifying secrets. And the rest goes on.

== Cast ==
- Finn Jones as Robert Burrows
- Jessica McNamee as Maia Eden
- Dane Rhodes as Joseph Ellis
- Donna Biscoe as Margaret Delacroix
- Thomas Francis Murphy as Maxwell Braun

== Production ==
In October 2021, The Visitor was announced as part of Blumhouse Television and Epix's TV movie deal, with Justin P. Lange directing with Adam Mason and Simon Boyes writing the screenplay, with Finn Jones and Jessica McNamee starring in the film.

== Release ==
The film was released digitally in the United States by Epix and Paramount Home Entertainment on October 7, 2022.

== Reception ==
=== Critical response ===
On the review aggregator website Rotten Tomatoes, 19% of 16 critics' reviews are positive, with an average rating of 4.7/10.
