= Anzhou, Hebei =

Town in Anxin County, Baoding, Hebei, China

Anzhou 安州
- Town
- Location in Hebei
- Coordinates: 38°52′35″N 115°49′27″E
- Country: China
- Province: Hebei
- Prefecture-level city: Baoding
- County: Anxin County
- Time zone: UTC+8 (China Standard)

Anzhou (Chinese: 安州; pinyin: Ānzhōu) is a town in Anxin County, Hebei, China. It is not far from Lake Baiyangdian. Now it belongs to Xiong'an New Area.
