= Finn Jones =

British actor (born 1988)

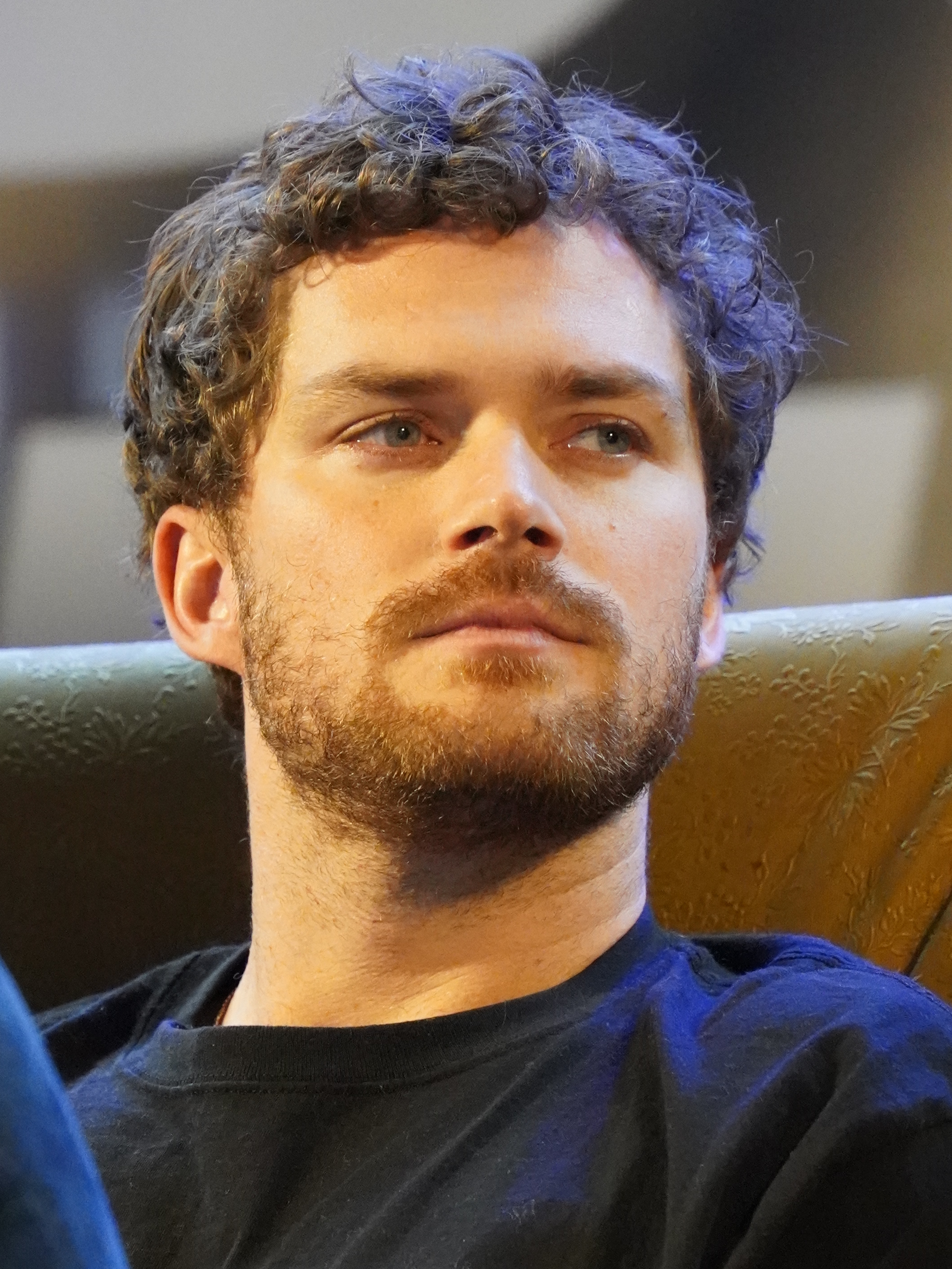
- Jones in 2023
- Born: Terence Jones; 24 March 1988 (age 38); London, England
- Occupation: Actor
- Years active: 2009–present
- Known for: Game of Thrones; Iron Fist
- Height: 1.83 m (6 ft 0 in)

Finn Jones (born Terence Jones; 24 March 1988) is an English actor known for his roles as Loras Tyrell in the HBO series Game of Thrones (2011–2016) and Danny Rand / Iron Fist in the Marvel Cinematic Universe since 2017, including in the series Iron Fist (2017–2018).

== Career ==
Jones trained at the Arts Educational Schools on a three-year acting course. Prior to this he was a Sixth Form student at Hayes School in Bromley.

In October 2009, Jones played Jamie, a young man who found love with Hannah Ashworth in the second series of Hollyoaks Later. Later, he returned to the Hollyoaks village to tie in with Emma Rigby's (Hannah Ashworth) departure in February 2010.

In January 2010, Jones appeared in the 11th series of Doctors. On 1 and 8 April 2010, he appeared in two episodes of The Bill playing Commander Lisa Kennedy's (played by Julie Graham) son Mark Kennedy, who was accused of murder. In the same month he finished filming for a new online drama called The Curfew commissioned by Channel 4 and produced by BAFTA award-winning company LittleLoud Productions.

Jones also played Santiago Jones in the Doctor Who spin-off The Sarah Jane Adventures in the story Death of the Doctor alongside Katy Manning as former Doctor Who companion Jo Grant and Matt Smith as the Eleventh Doctor.

On 19 June 2010, it was announced that Jones would be appearing in Game of Thrones, the HBO adaptation of George R. R. Martin's A Song of Ice and Fire novel series, as Ser Loras Tyrell. He also had a small role in the 2012 horror film Wrong Turn 5: Bloodlines.

In 2014, he starred in two films, Sleeping Beauty and The Last Showing. It was reported in February 2016, that Jones was cast as Danny Rand / Iron Fist for the Marvel Television/Netflix series, Iron Fist, set within the larger Marvel Cinematic Universe. In March 2016, Marvel officially confirmed that Jones was cast as Danny Rand. Jones reprised the role in The Defenders and the second season of Luke Cage and Iron Fist. Jones will reprise the role in the third season of Daredevil: Born Again.

In 2019, it was announced that Jones would join the second season of the Apple TV+ series Dickinson, playing Samuel Bowles.

== Personal life ==
Jones' birth name is Terence Jones. He changed it to avoid confusion with Terry Jones, a member of Monty Python.

In December 2015, Jones assisted Oxfam campaigners in raising money for their appeal to support Syrian refugees, by singing carols at a shopping centre in Islington. He appeared alongside Jeremy Corbyn, the Leader of the Labour Party, and later voiced his support for Corbyn in a post on Instagram.

== Filmography ==
=== Film ===
Year	Title	Role	Notes
2012	Wrong Turn 5: Bloodlines	Teddy	Direct-to-video
2014	Sleeping Beauty	Barrow	
2014	The Last Showing	Martin	
2017	Leatherface	Deputy Sorells	
2021	Awake	Brian	
2022	The Visitor	Robert Burrows	
TBA	As Deep as the Grave	Charles Lindbergh	Post-production

=== Television ===
Year	Title	Role	Notes
2009	Hollyoaks Later	Jamie	5 episodes
2010	Hollyoaks	Jamie	9 episodes
2010	The Sarah Jane Adventures	Santiago Jones	2 episodes
2010	The Bill	Mark Kennedy	2 episodes
2010–2011	Doctors	Tristan Bentley / Tim Hebdon	2 episodes
2011–2016	Game of Thrones	Loras Tyrell	Recurring role; 21 episodes
2015	Life in Squares	Julian Bell	3 episodes
2017–2018	Iron Fist	Daniel "Danny" Rand / Iron Fist	Lead role; 23 episodes
2017	The Defenders	Daniel "Danny" Rand / Iron Fist	Main role, miniseries; 8 episodes
2018	Luke Cage	Daniel "Danny" Rand / Iron Fist	Guest star; Episode: "The Main Ingredient"
2021	Dickinson	Samuel Bowles	Recurring role; 10 episodes
2022	Swimming with Sharks	Marty	Lead role; 6 episodes
2027	Daredevil: Born Again	Daniel "Danny" Rand / Iron Fist	Season 3; Post-production
