= Tijuana Ricks =

American actress

Tijuana Ricks (born in Metairie, Louisiana) is an American actress.

== Education ==
After graduating from Washington University in St. Louis where she received her degree in psychology and performing arts, she attended the Yale School of Drama and received her MFA in acting.

== Career ==
Ricks's most prominent roles have been recurring parts on Showtime's Billions as Tonelle “T” Burton, the Marvel Cinematic Universe TV series Luke Cage, Jessica Jones, and Iron Fist as reporter Thembi Wallace, Law & Order: Special Victims Unit as Dr. Marnie Aiken, OB/GYN, Law and Order as Sgt. Royce and Guiding Light as Nurse Maggie.

She had a small role in the film The Savages with Philip Seymour Hoffman and Laura Linney and has starred in many television and radio commercials.

Onstage, she originated the role of Cora Lee in the musical version of The Women of Brewster Place and made her Broadway debut in A Time to Kill as a court reporter named Norma.
