= Daredevil season 1 =

Daredevil
- Season 1
- Promotional poster
- Showrunner: Steven S. DeKnight
- Starring: Charlie Cox; Deborah Ann Woll; Elden Henson; Toby Leonard Moore; Vondie Curtis-Hall; Bob Gunton; Ayelet Zurer; Rosario Dawson; Vincent D'Onofrio
- No. of episodes: 13

Release
- Original network: Netflix
- Original release: April 10, 2015

Season chronology
- Next → Season 2

The first season of the American streaming television series Daredevil, which is based on the Marvel Comics character of the same name, follows the early days of Matt Murdock / Daredevil, a lawyer-by-day who fights crime at night, juxtaposed with the rise of crime lord Wilson Fisk. It is set in the Marvel Cinematic Universe (MCU), sharing continuity with the films and other television series of the franchise. The season was produced by Marvel Television in association with ABC Studios, DeKnight Productions and Goddard Textiles, with Steven S. DeKnight serving as showrunner, and series creator Drew Goddard acting as consultant.

Charlie Cox stars as Murdock, while Vincent D'Onofrio plays Fisk. They are joined by principal cast members Deborah Ann Woll, Elden Henson, Toby Leonard Moore, Vondie Curtis-Hall, Bob Gunton, Ayelet Zurer, and Rosario Dawson. Daredevil entered development in late 2013, with Goddard hired in December. DeKnight replaced him as showrunner and Cox was hired to star in May 2014. Filmed in New York City from July to December 2014, the season focuses on the darker, more mature elements of the source material. Stephanie Maslansky designed the costumes for the season, with the final red suit for Daredevil designed by Ryan Meinerding and the costume artists at Marvel Studios. The season features links and references to other MCU projects, including future Netflix series.

The first two episodes of the season premiered in Los Angeles on April 2, 2015, with the full season of 13 episodes released on Netflix on April 10 to an estimated high viewership. Critics praised the performances, particularly D'Onofrio's, and the darker tone and action sequences of the series compared to other properties set in the MCU. However, some of the pacing during the season and the final red Daredevil suit received criticism. The first season received three nominations at 67th Primetime Creative Arts Emmy Awards, for Outstanding Special Visual Effects from Shade VFX, Outstanding Sound Editing for a One-Hour Series, and for Outstanding Main Title Design. The series was renewed for a second season on April 21, 2015.

== Episodes ==
| No. overall | No. in season | Title | Directed by | Written by | Original release date |
|---|---|---|---|---|---|
| 1 | 1 | "Into the Ring" | Phil Abraham | Drew Goddard | April 10, 2015 |
Crime cartels, including the Russian mafia, Yakuza, and Chinese mob, have exploited Hell's Kitchen's circumstances since "the incident". (Note: "The incident" refers to the Battle of New York depicted in the film The Avengers (2012).) Blinded as a boy in an accident that gave him heightened senses, Matt Murdock starts fighting this rising criminal element by night as a costumed vigilante while opening a law firm with his friend, Foggy Nelson. Their first client is Karen Page, a secretary for construction company Union Allied, who has been framed for the murder of her co-worker, Daniel Fisher, after accidentally uncovering a money laundering scheme. Murdock stops Karen from being prosecuted and protects her from a professional hitman before exposing the scandal through Ben Urich at The New York Bulletin. Grateful for their help, Page offers to work for Murdock and Nelson. James Wesley covers up the involvement of his employer in the scandal, and orders Anatoly and Vladimir Ranskahov, the Russians' leaders, to handle Murdock ("the man in black"): they kidnap a young boy to lure him into a trap.
| 2 | 2 | "Cut Man" | Phil Abraham | Drew Goddard | April 10, 2015 |
When Murdock was a boy, his father was murdered by the Hell's Kitchen Irish Mob for winning a match he was told to throw. Now, after failing to rescue the kidnapped boy, a severely injured Murdock is found in a dumpster by nurse Claire Temple. Nelson meanwhile attempts to comfort Page following her recent traumatic experiences. Temple takes Murdock to her apartment, tends to his wounds, and removes his mask, discovering his blindness. He refuses to reveal his name, but does reveal his heightened senses when they alert him to a Russian who is searching the apartment building, giving Temple time to hide Murdock and convince the man that she knows nothing. Murdock realizes that the man did not believe her, and overpowers him, taking him to the roof. Murdock and Temple torture him into revealing the boy's location, before Murdock pushes him off the roof and into the same dumpster; Murdock says he will survive. Murdock enters the building where they are keeping the boy, defeats the guards, and rescues the boy.
| 3 | 3 | "Rabbit in a Snowstorm" | Adam Kane | Marco Ramirez | April 10, 2015 |
Wesley, having become aware of Nelson and Murdock because of their involvement with Page during the Union Allied scandal, hires them to defend John Healy, an assassin. Though Nelson wishes not to get involved with an obvious criminal element, Murdock wishes to use the case to discover who Wesley's employer is, and so accepts Wesley's offer, which includes a substantial sum to ensure their silence. Page receives a similar offer from Union Allied, who do not want her to talk to anyone else about the scandal, and threaten to sue her for leaking company secrets to the press if she does not agree. Despite this, Page goes to Urich, whose editor Mitchell Ellison is forcing him to write superfluous stories rather than the major crime breaks of his youth, and offers to tell him more about the Union Allied scandal. After successfully defending Healy, Murdock confronts him in costume and forces him to reveal Wesley's employer, Wilson Fisk. Healy commits suicide rather than be confronted by the consequences of revealing Fisk's identity.
| 4 | 4 | "In the Blood" | Ken Girotti | Joe Pokaski | April 10, 2015 |
Murdock is unable to find any record of Fisk, and so continues to interrogate criminals, searching for answers. Wesley informs the Ranskahovs of an offer Fisk has made to help with their operations, given their recent failures. Angered at this apparent slight, they attempt to stop the man in black once and for all by visiting in hospital the Russian whom Murdock threw from the roof. After the Russian tells them of Temple, they send men to kidnap her, but she manages to call Murdock in time to alert him of her kidnapping. The Russians attempt to torture Murdock's name out of Temple, but Murdock arrives and defeats the gangsters. Seeing the aftermath of this, the Ranskahovs decide to agree to Fisk's offer, with Anatoly going to tell Fisk personally, by barging into the restaurant where Fisk is having dinner with an art gallery curator named Vanessa Marianna. Fisk takes a confused Marianna home, and angered at this intrusion and embarrassment, Fisk brutally decapitates Anatoly and orders Wesley to send the body to Vladimir, framing Murdock.
| 5 | 5 | "World on Fire" | Farren Blackburn | Luke Kalteux | April 10, 2015 |
Fisk explains the situation to his allies, including Chinese leader Madame Gao, of whom he asks a special favor. Elena Cardenas, a renter of powerful businessman Armand Tulley, comes to Nelson and Murdock after Tulley, who wants to convert her apartment building, sends men to wreck her home. Nelson goes to Tulley's lawyers at Landman and Zack (where he and Murdock once interned), represented by Marci Stahl, Nelson's ex-girlfriend. She explains that Cardenas and her neighbors can either take a large settlement or be evicted. While looking for complaints against Tulley at the police station, Murdock realizes Detectives Carl Hoffman and Christian Blake are corrupt when he hears them kill a Russian. Murdock later incapacitates Blake and uses his cell phone to find Vladimir. Fisk pays Turk Barrett to reveal to Vladimir that Fisk killed Anatoly, and as they prepare for a war against Fisk, their forces are destroyed in a suicide attack by Gao's workers. Vladimir survives, but Murdock finds him, as they are surrounded by police.
| 6 | 6 | "Condemned" | Guy Ferland | Joe Pokaski & Marco Ramirez | April 10, 2015 |
Murdock takes out the police when they try to kill Vladimir on Fisk's orders, and takes Vladimir to an abandoned warehouse, hoping for answers about Fisk, while Nelson and Cardenas are injured in the bombings. With Temple's help, Murdock cauterizes Vladimir's wounds, alerting a non-corrupt police officer to their presence. The officer calls in Murdock and Vladimir's location, and the warehouse is soon surrounded. Blake and Hoffman take control of the situation, and await Fisk's orders. Fisk talks to Murdock via police radio, telling him of his admiration for what Murdock is trying to do, even though it clashes with Fisk's own plans to save the city. Fisk then frames the vigilante by having an ESU sniper open fire on other officers from the roof of the warehouse, critically wounding Blake and killing two other officers. Vladimir, in return for Murdock avenging Anatoly's death, gives him information on Leland Owlsley – the accountant for all of Fisk's operations – before giving his life so that Murdock can escape.
| 7 | 7 | "Stick" | Brad Turner | Douglas Petrie | April 10, 2015 |
Murdock tracks down Owlsley, but is distracted by the arrival of an elderly man: Murdock's mentor, Stick, who taught him to master his abilities as a child, but abandoned him when Murdock developed an attachment to him. Now, he enlists Murdock's help in destroying Black Sky, a weapon that the Japanese, led by Nobu Yoshioka, are bringing to New York. Stick agrees to refrain from killing, but breaks his promise when he kills Black Sky, who is actually a young boy. Murdock fights Stick and wins, so Stick agrees to leave the city. Urich, having agreed to help Page expose the further scandal and corruption surrounding Hell's Kitchen and Union Allied, explains that they need proof before they can publish anything. While searching for a connection between Tulley's men and Union Allied, Page is confronted by them. Nelson helps her escape them, so she and Urich explain their investigation to him. Stick later converses with a heavily scarred man about Murdock's role in events to come.
| 8 | 8 | "Shadows in the Glass" | Stephen Surjik | Steven S. DeKnight | April 10, 2015 |
Page and Nelson bring Murdock in on their plan, and he agrees as long as they stop putting themselves in harm's way, and use the legal system rather than underhanded tactics. Owlsley and Nobu, angry at being confronted by the vigilante and losing Black Sky, respectively, express their displeasure with Fisk, while he is also dealing with Blake, who wakes up in the hospital. Fisk convinces Hoffman to kill Blake before he can speak out against Fisk, but Hoffman is incapacitated by Murdock, who gets information on Fisk from Blake before he dies. Gao visits Fisk, warning him that he will have to get everything under control if he does not want to be side-stepped. An angry Fisk is later consoled by Vanessa, and he tells her of how, as a child, he murdered his father when he was beating Fisk's mother. She convinces him to stand up and go public with his intentions to save the city. This negates all of Murdock's information from Blake, which Urich was going to publish.
| 9 | 9 | "Speak of the Devil" | Nelson McCormick | Christos Gage & Ruth Fletcher Gage | April 10, 2015 |
In the wake of Fisk's public revelation, Murdock, Page, Nelson, and Urich begin searching for something from Fisk's past that they can use against him. Murdock visits Vanessa at her art gallery, hoping to gain insight into Fisk by speaking with her, and encounters Fisk himself. Nobu demands a promised city block from Fisk, who agrees on the condition Nobu provide him with a "specialist" to deal with the vigilante. The block, which Fisk has bought from Tulley, is where Cardenas lives, and she is one of the few tenants who stands in the way of Fisk gifting it to Nobu. When Cardenas is killed by a junkie, Murdock realizes that Fisk is behind it, and tracks him to an abandoned warehouse, where he is confronted by the specialist: Nobu. Murdock eventually defeats Nobu, accidentally causing him to burn alive, but sustains serious injuries. Fisk then confronts Murdock, beating him nearly to death. Murdock barely escapes, only to collapse at his home in front of Nelson.
| 10 | 10 | "Nelson v. Murdock" | Farren Blackburn | Luke Kalteux | April 10, 2015 |
After Temple tends to Murdock's wounds, Nelson confronts him about his "blindness" and vigilante activities. Murdock explains that after experiencing the twisted morals of Landman and Zack, Murdock took it upon himself to confront an abusive father with no legal evidence against him, but who Murdock had discovered through his heightened senses. Since then, he had been doing everything he could to make the city a better place whenever the law could not. Nelson, unable to look past Murdock's lies, leaves their firm. Urich, after the extension on his sick wife's hospital stay is denied and he is offered a better paying job as an editor rather than a reporter, decides to give up the investigation. Page, in an attempt to change his mind, takes him to a rest home she just discovered, where they meet Marlene Vistain, Fisk's mother, who tells them that Fisk killed his father. Fisk, meanwhile, is hosting a charity gala to publicly raise money for victims of the bombings. There, many of the guests, including Vanessa, are poisoned.
| 11 | 11 | "The Path of the Righteous" | Nick Gomez | Steven S. DeKnight & Douglas Petrie | April 10, 2015 |
Still recovering from his injuries, Murdock says goodbye to Temple, who is leaving for a time. Before she goes, Temple suggests that he get better protection if he is going to continue his crusade. With the help of Barrett, Murdock finds Melvin Potter, a mentally unbalanced engineer who has been coerced into creating armored clothing for Fisk, and asks him to make a suit of body armor in exchange for stopping Fisk from hurting anyone else. Page wishes to reveal the story of how Vistain is alive, and says that Fisk killed his father, but Urich explains that it is unreliable, given her state of mind. While Fisk will not leave Marianna's side as she recovers in hospital, Wesley receives a phone call from Vistain and learns that Page and Urich visited her. He confronts Page and attempts to blackmail her into not exposing Fisk, threatening to hurt her friends. When Fisk calls Wesley to find out where he is, the ringing distracts him long enough for Page to take his gun and kill him.
| 12 | 12 | "The Ones We Leave Behind" | Euros Lyn | Douglas Petrie | April 10, 2015 |
Using information from Urich, Murdock finds the base of Gao's heroin operation and dismantles it, with Gao, who can hold her own against Murdock, escaping and deciding to return to her homeland to think about the future. Fisk's men find Wesley, and the grieving Fisk realizes that the last person he talked to was Vistain. Wanting to keep those he loves safe by sending them out of the country, Fisk is unable to convince Marianna to leave him, but does get Vistain away, with the sick Vistain unable to tell him what her call to Wesley was about. Nelson continues his work without Murdock, and takes what they know to Stahl. Page, struggling to get over killing Wesley, convinces Urich to write the story, but it is rejected by Ellison. When Urich accuses Ellison of being paid off by Fisk, he gets fired. Urich decides to start his own blog to get Fisk's story out there, but Fisk's real informant in the New York Bulletin tells him that Urich visited Vistain, angering him to the point that he breaks into Urich's apartment and murders him.
| 13 | 13 | "Daredevil" | Steven S. DeKnight | Steven S. DeKnight | April 10, 2015 |
Murdock and Page attend Urich's funeral, while Fisk learns that Owlsley and Gao conspired to poison Marianna, whom they deemed a distraction, and that Owlsley has been hiding Hoffman as an insurance policy. When Owlsley tries to blackmail him, an infuriated Fisk kills Owlsley by throwing him into an open elevator shaft. Murdock and Nelson reconcile their differences, and begin building their case against Fisk. As the vigilante, Murdock finds Hoffman with information from Stahl and convinces him to testify against Fisk. Acting on this testimony, federal agents arrest Fisk and his co-conspirators, but Fisk's mercenaries and corrupt law enforcement officers manage to help free him from federal custody. Before he can flee the city, Murdock ambushes him, wearing the new armor formed for him by Potter. After a brutal fight, Murdock defeats Fisk and leaves him to the police. With Fisk arrested, Marianna leaves the city. Murdock, Nelson, and Page celebrate their success and resume their work. The vigilante is named "Daredevil" by the media.

== Cast and characters ==
=== Main ===
- Charlie Cox as Matt Murdock / Daredevil
- Deborah Ann Woll as Karen Page
- Elden Henson as Franklin "Foggy" Nelson
- Toby Leonard Moore as James Wesley
- Vondie Curtis-Hall as Ben Urich
- Bob Gunton as Leland Owlsley
- Ayelet Zurer as Vanessa Marianna
- Rosario Dawson as Claire Temple
- Vincent D'Onofrio as Wilson Fisk

=== Recurring ===
- Peter McRobbie as Paul Lantom
- Rob Morgan as Turk Barrett
- Royce Johnson as Brett Mahoney
- Daryl Edwards as Carl Hoffman
- Chris Tardio as Christian Blake
- Wai Ching Ho as Gao
- Peter Shinkoda as Nobu Yoshioka

- Nikolai Nikolaeff as Vladimir Ranskahov
- Susan Varon as Josie
- Geoffrey Cantor as Mitchell Ellison
- Adriane Lenox as Doris Urich
- Judith Delgado as Elena Cardenas
- Amy Rutberg as Marci Stahl
- Tom Walker as Francis

== Production ==
=== Development ===
In October 2013, Marvel and Disney announced that Marvel Television and ABC Studios would provide Netflix with live action series centered around Daredevil, Jessica Jones, Iron Fist, and Luke Cage, leading up to a miniseries based on the Defenders. Drew Goddard was hired to serve as executive producer and showrunner for Daredevil, with his production company Goddard Textiles producing the season, however, in May 2014 it was announced that Goddard had stepped down as showrunner in order to focus on directing a feature film based on Marvel's Sinister Six for Sony Pictures Entertainment. He was succeeded by Steven S. DeKnight and his production company DeKnight Productions. Goddard, who wrote the first two episodes, remained with the show as a consultant and executive producer. It was also revealed that the series would be titled Marvel's Daredevil. The first season consists of 13 hour-long episodes. Peter Friedlander, Allie Goss, Kris Henigman, Cindy Holland, Alan Fine, Stan Lee, Joe Quesada, Dan Buckley, Jim Chory, Loeb, Goddard, and DeKnight served as executive producers. Kati Johnston served as a producer.

=== Writing ===
The season does not directly adapt any one storyline from the comics, with DeKnight feeling that it was more important to focus on "nailing the spirit of the comics". Nonetheless, notable comics stories whose elements were adapted into the season include Frank Miller and John Romita Jr.'s 1993 miniseries Daredevil: The Man Without Fear, a retelling of the character's origin story. DeKnight stated that Netflix's support of "the creatives" coupled with Marvel's restrictions on their properties led to him pushing the source material as far as he could while remaining respectful of the characters and their history, and being surprised at "how willing everyone is to take a really fresh look and really push what we're doing." Vincent D'Onofrio likened the Netflix production more to a "13-hour film" than to a television series, noting that the format allowed for the time needed to tell the story and "be much more specific". Deborah Ann Woll explained that what she saw as one of the most important themes in the series was normal people having an impact in "seemingly insurmountable circumstances", with the focus not being on Daredevil's abilities or the characters' qualifications, but on their willingness to help people.

Though the season was much more violent than previous Marvel Cinematic Universe (MCU) works, DeKnight felt that sexual violence would be "too far", saying that "Daredevil wasn't asking for a lot of sexual situations, especially since Matt Murdock is not really in the position to get into a relationship, and it just didn't fit the story for that season. I think that'll change moving forward, but I never pushed any kind of sexual agenda on the show. I think once Daredevil was a hit and people were really responding positively, you can see the progression into more of an adult world in Jessica Jones."

Speaking about the way the season reveals the name Daredevil, DeKnight explained that several options had been brought up, such as "one of the versions in the comics where when he was a kid people used to taunt him with the name Daredevil", which did not fit in the world of the series, or having Ben Urich give the character the name, but the timing for that did not work due to Urich's death before the final Daredevil suit was introduced. It was decided that instead of having the name Daredevil said onscreen, it would be easier to introduce it through the media as a newspaper headline. On why this was not done for Wilson Fisk as Kingpin, DeKnight stated that he felt it would "get a little bit silly....[if] we went, 'Oh they called him Daredevil! Oh they called him Kingpin!'", and was unable to come up with another natural way for the name Kingpin to come up, so it was decided to leave that for a later time.

=== Casting ===
The main cast for the season includes Charlie Cox as Matt Murdock / Daredevil, Deborah Ann Woll as Karen Page, Elden Henson as Franklin "Foggy" Nelson, Toby Leonard Moore as James Wesley, Vondie Curtis-Hall as Ben Urich, Bob Gunton as Leland Owlsley, Ayelet Zurer as Vanessa Marianna, Rosario Dawson as Claire Temple, and Vincent D'Onofrio as Wilson Fisk.

In July 2014, Peter Shinkoda was reported to have a recurring role in the season, portraying Hashiro. In March 2015, this character was revealed to actually be Nobu Yoshioka, while recurring opponents for Daredevil – Madame Gao, Vladimir Ranskahov, and Turk Barrett – were also announced, portrayed by Wai Ching Ho, Nikolai Nikolaeff, and Rob Morgan. Additionally, the following also recur throughout the season: Geoffrey Cantor as Mitchell Ellison; Judith Delgado as Elena Cardenas; Daryl Edwards as Carl Hoffman; Royce Johnson as Brett Mahoney; Adriane Lenox as Doris Urich; Peter McRobbie as Father Paul Lantom; Amy Rutberg as Marci Stahl; Chris Tardio as Christian Blake; Susan Varon as Josie; and Tom Walker as Francis.

=== Design ===
The two costumes worn by Cox in the season: first, his black "vigilante outfit"; second, his red "classic suit".

Costume designer Stephanie Maslansky read the first two episodes' scripts and some outlines of future scripts, and developed a "solid understanding" of the character arcs and overall story to begin the advanced planning needed for costume design. She also asked questions to prepare for character's stunt requirements and the building or retro-fitting of more complex costumes.

Murdock begins the season wearing a black costume (called the "vigilante outfit" by production), inspired by the one worn by the character in Frank Miller's comic book miniseries Daredevil: The Man Without Fear (1993–1994), rather than the more traditional red, horned suit. This was done to highlight the formation of Matt Murdock as Daredevil, with the costume evolving over time as the character develops. Marvel Comics' Chief Creative Officer Quesada conceptualized the look based on DeKnight's specifications. On the design process, DeKnight revealed that "we tried practically everything, design-wise. We experimented with a lot of different head pieces. One version was a ski mask with the eyes sewn shut. We tried everything until we found something that just felt right." DeKnight and Quesada explained that the idea was for Murdock to start out with a homemade outfit that fits more in the "real-world" of the series, and to then evolve it into the classic Daredevil suit. Maslansky noted that they wanted the outfit to "look like something that Matt Murdock could put together himself, that he could either order off the Internet or shop around town. [...] we wound up with pretty practical choices for him. His shirts are compression shirts and his pants wound up being from an army/navy store." Concerning the black mask, Maslansky noted that a balance between aesthetic and safety was required, and that it was made of layers of cotton mesh that "really conform to his head" but also allowed Cox to see through the mask.

On the red suit, Maslansky said, "We wanted something that looked militaristic and functional, but also dramatic and sexy" adding that it was "tricky" making it practical. To begin the process of creating the suit, Quesada contacted Ryan Meinerding and the costume artists and design team at Marvel Studios, who all contributed design ideas, with one of Meinerding's ultimately being picked. Quesada, who previously worked as an artist on Daredevil comics, gave several suggestions, including the incorporation of some of how New York was created into the suit, which led to the use of rivets and "architectural" shapes. The suit is intended to look like a Kevlar vest, and the black sections are an homage to comic panels where the artists highlighted certain areas with red, with "deeper portions" in shadow. On the mask, Meinerding noted the difficulty in designing the entire top half of a face that is intended to match the bottom half of an actor's face, "because half of his face has to be covered and has its own expression and the actor's face is going to be doing something else". For the billy clubs used by Daredevil in the series, which were designed by Andy Park, discussions were had about having them holstered on the right leg, given that both Cox and his stunt double Chris Brewster are right handed, but it was ultimately decided to have the holster on the left hand side as it is in the "classic profile" of the comics. DeKnight explained that Murdock's Daredevil suit does not have the "DD" emblem on the chest as seen in the comics, because Murdock receives his moniker only after the suit is introduced. He also felt that the emblem was "one of the more problematic emblems in superhero-dom", and that Daredevil's suit in the comics was "very difficult to translate to screen, especially in this world that is grounded and gritty".

Many of the male characters in the series are often seen wearing suits, which Maslansky was comfortable with after working as the costume designer on the television series White Collar (2009–2014). Murdock's suits are differentiated more by texture than color, with a limited palette, given that the character cannot see what color his clothing is. Cox's size changed throughout the series as he continued to work out. For Murdock's sunglasses, Maslansky worked with series prop master Michael Jortner to make something that fit into the modern world, but paid homage to "what was familiar to fans". Close to 100 different versions of the prop were created for Cox to try. For the women of the series, Maslansky looked to their backstories in the show, with Page having dreams and fantasies of a life in New York along the lines of Katharine Hepburn and Lauren Bacall, and dressing according to those thoughts ("retro, slim skirts, tighter fitting tops and slim dresses"), while Marianna coming into the series as a mysterious yet glamorous femme fatale, dressing in high-end, couture clothing; "she needed to appeal to [Fisk]. He wouldn't go for just any chick in a pair of old jeans and a t-shirt."

=== Filming ===
In February 2014, Marvel announced that Daredevil would be filmed in New York City. In April 2014, Quesada reiterated this, stating that the show would be filming in areas of Brooklyn and Long Island City that still look like the old Hell's Kitchen, in addition to sound stage work. Loeb said that Daredevil would begin filming in July 2014, and DeKnight confirmed that filming had started that month. It filmed under the working title Bluff, on a $56 million budget. The production received $14.3 million under the New York Film & TV Tax Credit Program. Production concluded on December 21, 2014. Other filming locations in New York City included the Williamsburg, Greenpoint and Bushwick neighborhoods in Brooklyn; Abe Lebewohl Park in the East Village; Whitestone Lanes bowling alley in Flushing, Queens; the New York State Supreme Court Building, with the interior for court scenes filmed on a set; Brooklyn Borough Hall; the Rockefeller Center rooftop gardens; Brooklyn College for Murdock and Nelson's flashback to their time in college; the Chelsea neighborhood in Manhattan; and the Honeywell Bridge in Long Island City.

"Cut Man" ends with a long action sequence filmed in a single take. DeKnight called it the "most complicated action scene" in the series, due to the technical difficulty in filming it, and credited Goddard, episodic director Phil Abraham, stunt coordinator Philip J Silvera, and series cinematographer Matt Lloyd with realizing it. He also named The Raid films as inspiration for the sequence. There were only a few days to plan and set up the fight, as opposed to a film which would allow "at least a couple of weeks", and it took 7 or 8 takes to get the shot right. Silvera explained that the scene was always scripted to be a one-shot, and that he had intended to work around it with wipes, but Abraham challenged the team to do it all for real, which allowed the fight to feel more grounded by having them "slow down the fight, and just have this raw, animalistic feeling happening." The final shot does include some "Texas Switches" between actors and stunt doubles, but was ultimately filmed with no cuts.

Talking about the scene where Fisk beheads Anatoly Ranskahov with a car door in "In the Blood", DeKnight noted that series like Spartacus (2010–2013) and The Walking Dead (2010–2022) would have shown the head being crushed, which he felt was "the right choice" for them, but for Daredevil "we did very much a Psycho thing, we saw the aftereffects of it, but you never saw the car door crushing his head. [...] Sound effects, absolutely. It's a very disturbing scene without crossing that line into a horror movie kind of deal."

=== Visual effects and editing ===
Visual effects for the series were completed by the New York studio Shade VFX; Daredevil featured over 1000 visual effect shots. Executive visual effects supervisor Bryan Goswin explained that the company's work included the creation of digital doubles when stunts were not safe for actors or stunt doubles, as well as blood-hits and wounds, with "a lot of support to the idea of the violence and gore that happens in Daredevil" given to differentiate the series from other Marvel projects, and to try to set the series in a "more realistic and dark place, the real streets of New York."

One shot created by Shade VFX is when the audience sees Matt Murdock's "vision" – the way that he "sees" using his other heightened senses. On why this was only used once in the season, DeKnight explained that it had in fact been budgeted to appear several more times, with the effect actually completed at least twice more for the season. It was removed for several reasons, including to avoid taking away the specialty of it, and to maintain the crime drama tone of the series. One instance where it would have been used again was in "Stick", where the audience would have seen how Murdock saw Stick as he threw keys at him, and then when he is older and Stick throws fighting sticks at him and his senses are more refined. In that case, the effect was not finished on time. Another instance was in "The Ones We Leave Behind" when Murdock comes across a Chinese worker and realizes that he has been blinded. The final use of the effect was going to be in "Daredevil" when the camera pushes in on Page's reaction Murdock telling her that they can work together. Here, the effect was hiding all of the nuances in her expression, so it was decided that it would be better to remove it.

Editing for the season was done by Jonathan Chibnall.

=== Music ===
Composer John Paesano was brought on "a couple of weeks in to post-production", and scored an episode every four to five days. Paesano estimated that each episode has around 25–30 minutes of music in it. In approaching the series' score, Paesano looked to DeKnight, who "had a very clear vision of what he wanted [...] music you could feel and not necessarily hear." The result was a more minimalist score than typical "superhero" music, although the music starts to "change color" and move closer to that of the MCU when the classic red costume is introduced. Most of the score was produced electronically, though live elements, such as a cello, were used where possible. Rather than "keep the drive and the energy up" with drums, Paesano elected to use a low pulsing heartbeat that was inline with the series' minimalist approach, and tied into the fact that Daredevil can hear people's heartbeats in the show. A soundtrack album for the season was released digitally by Hollywood Records on April 28, 2015.

All music composed by John Paesano, unless otherwise noted.

Daredevil (Original Soundtrack Album)
| No. | Title | Music | Length |
|---|---|---|---|
| 1. | "Main Title" | John Paesano & Braden Kimball | 1:04 |
| 2. | "Fogwell's Gym" | | 3:53 |
| 3. | "Battlin' Jack Murdock" | | 3:05 |
| 4. | "Hallway Fight" | | 4:26 |
| 5. | "Union Allied" | | 1:51 |
| 6. | "Passenger Side" | | 2:57 |
| 7. | "A World on Fire" | | 1:26 |
| 8. | "Ben Urich" | | 3:09 |
| 9. | "Stick" | | 2:11 |
| 10. | "Wilson Fisk" | | 4:38 |
| 11. | "Worthy Opponents" | | 2:28 |
| 12. | "Avocados at Law" | | 1:42 |
| 13. | "Man of Ill Intent" | | 3:45 |
| 14. | "The Suit" | | 5:43 |
| 15. | "Daredevil" | | 1:41 |
| Total length: | | | 41:45 |

=== Marvel Cinematic Universe tie-ins ===
In February 2015, Emma Fleisher of Marvel Television stated that Daredevil takes place in the aftermath of the film The Avengers (2012), but would not "explicitly [be] in that Agents of S.H.I.E.L.D. world. We're in our own corner [of the MCU]. So the aliens came down and ruined the city, and this is the story of Hell's Kitchen's rebuild." Connections to other MCU properties include the character of Carl "Crusher" Creel, who appears in Agents of S.H.I.E.L.D. portrayed by Brian Patrick Wade, and is mentioned as having fought Jack Murdock in the latter's final boxing match; St. Agnes Orphanage, where both Matt Murdock and Agents of S.H.I.E.L.D.'s Skye are raised; the insignia on Madame Gao's heroin, which is a connection to the Iron Fist antagonist Steel Serpent; and mentions of Roxxon Oil, a company featured throughout the MCU.

The final scene of "Stick", featuring a conversation between Stick and Stone, was meant to hint at further ties between the series and other areas of the MCU in the same way as Marvel's film post-credits scenes, though it could not actually go after the episode's credits due to the way that Netflix begins the next episode during the credits of the current one. There were discussions about having another such "coda" at the end of the season finale, one which would have featured Leland Owlsley attempting to escape New York, only to be killed by the Punisher in a surprise introduction. The scene would not have shown the actor's face, but would have included the character's iconic skull insignia. The idea was dropped, again because of Netflix's playing system, and Owlsley was ultimately killed by Fisk in the episode, with the introduction of the Punisher saved for the series' second season.

== Marketing ==
At the October 2014 New York Comic Con, footage from the series was shown. In January 2015, a motion film poster was released to coincide with the revealing of the streaming date for the first season. The following month, on February 4, a teaser trailer was released. Merrill Barr of Forbes noted the dark tone of the trailer in a similar vein to DC Comics' Arrow and different from Marvel's ABC television series, but questioned the timing of the trailer debut after Super Bowl XLIX, especially as the company did not air trailers during the event for Avengers: Age of Ultron or Ant-Man and could have benefited from introducing "its latest and riskiest show" to general audiences through it. In March 2015, an additional motion poster was released, which featured all major characters and Avengers Tower in the background of the poster, as well as the possible reveal of Murdock's red suit in his reflection. In the lead up to the first-season premiere, a street marketing campaign appeared across the world in 12 cities with various artists creating murals. On April 2, 2015, the series had its premiere at the Regal Premiere House at L.A. Live where the first two episodes were previewed.

== Release ==
=== Streaming ===
The first season of Daredevil was released on April 10, 2015, on the streaming service Netflix, in all territories where it is available, in Ultra HD 4K. On April 14, 2015, Daredevil was the first Netflix series to receive its Descriptive Video Service audio description track, "a narration track that describes what is happening on-screen, including physical actions, facial expressions, costumes, settings and scene changes." By April 16, episodes for the series had been pirated by 2.1 million individual users worldwide, according to Excipio, a piracy tracking firm, surpassed in that timeframe only by Game of Thrones. The biggest countries for piracy were Brazil (190,274 torrent downloaders), India (149,316), the US (144,351), the UK (119,891), France (105,473) and Australia (101,025). Except for India, Netflix was available in each of those countries at the time. The season was enhanced to be available in high-dynamic-range video after its initial release by post-production vendor Deluxe.

The season, along with the additional Daredevil seasons and the other Marvel Netflix series, was removed from Netflix on March 1, 2022, due to Netflix's license for the series ending and Disney regaining the rights. The season became available on Disney+ in the United States, Canada, United Kingdom, Ireland, Australia, and New Zealand on March 16, ahead of its debut in Disney+'s other markets by the end of 2022.

=== Home media ===
The season was released on DVD in Region 2 and Blu-ray in Region B on October 3, 2016, in Region 1 and Region A on November 8, 2016, and in Region 4 on December 7, 2016.

== Reception ==
=== Audience viewership ===
As Netflix did not reveal subscriber viewership numbers for any of their original series at the time of the show’s release, Luth Research compiled data for the season, based on a sample of 2,500 Netflix subscribers watching via computers, tablets or smartphones (Luth Research does not track Netflix viewing on televisions, whether Internet-connected sets or those linked to streaming-media players or gaming consoles). According to Luth, an estimated 10.7% of subscribers (approximately 4.4 million) watched at least one episode of Daredevil in its first 11 days on Netflix, with 2.3% (940,000) watching on the first day. In a separate study, Netflix determined that the fifth episode of the season was the one to "hook" viewers, "to the point where they [continued on to watch] the entire first season."

=== Critical response ===
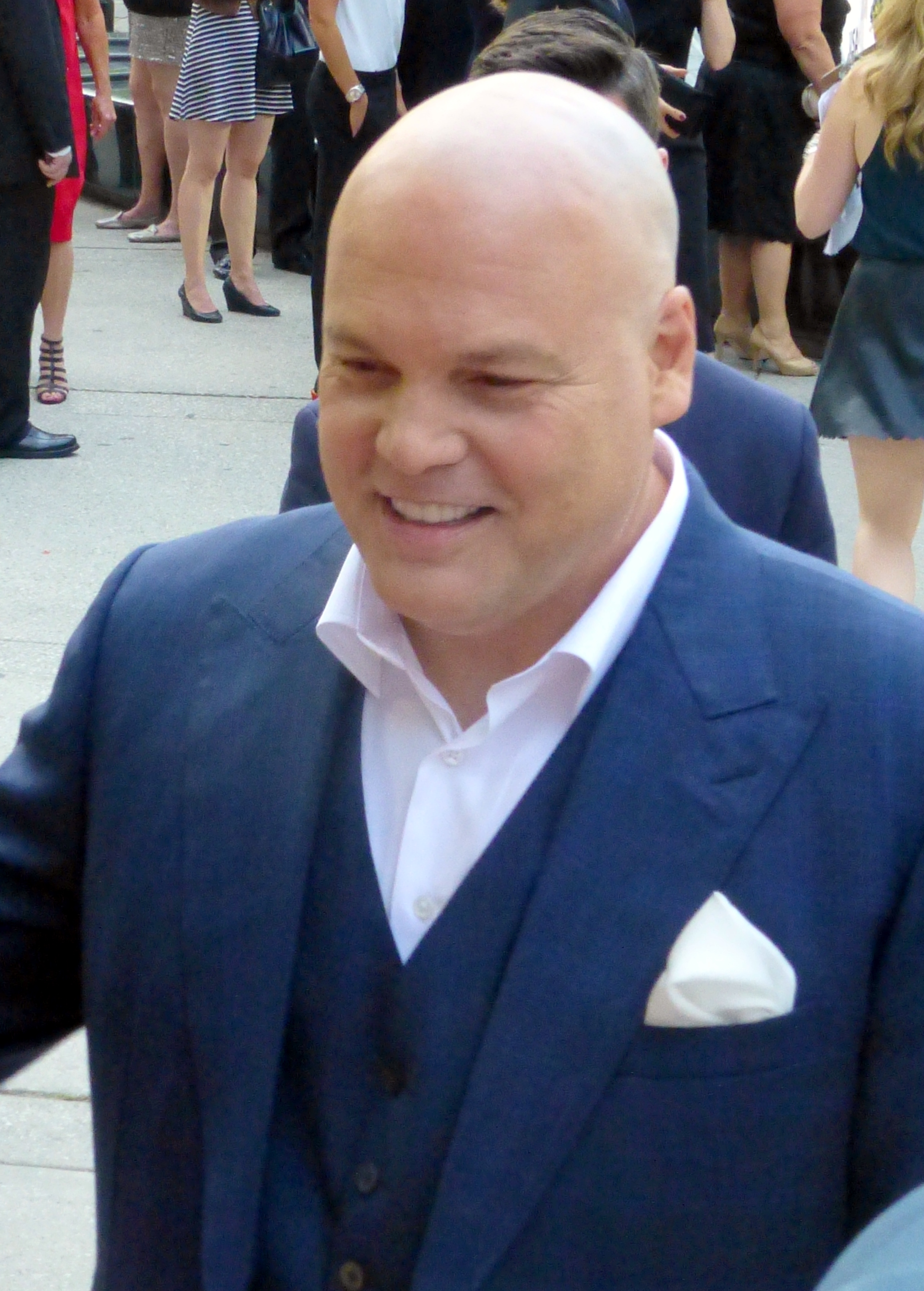
Vincent D'Onofrio's performance as Wilson Fisk was one of the highlights of the series for critics.

The review aggregator website Rotten Tomatoes reported a 99% approval rating with an average rating of 8.1/10 based on 72 reviews. The website's critical consensus reads, "With tight adherence to its source material's history, high production quality, and a no-nonsense dramatic flair, Daredevil excels as an effective superhero origin story, a gritty procedural, and an exciting action adventure." Metacritic, which uses a weighted average, assigned a score of 75 out of 100, based on 22 critics, indicating "generally favorable" reviews.

In reviews for the first five episodes of the series, Brian Lowry of Variety felt that "Compared to Marvel's experience with Agents of S.H.I.E.L.D. for ABC, operating in Netflix's pay-to-view world is clearly liberating" in terms of what can be done and shown. Matt Patches of Esquire added, "The show's exterior recasts the high fructose, splash page aesthetic of Iron Man, Thor, Captain America with neo-noir attitude. Goddard and DeKnight drench Daredevil in shadows and blood." He compared Daredevil to "a TV spinoff" of Christopher Nolan's The Dark Knight trilogy, and praised Cox and D'Onofrio's portrayals, while criticizing a subplot involving Nelson and Page and noting that the slow pacing of Daredevil, in which story may be stretched out more than needs be, could be a problem for binge-watchers. Victoria McNally of MTV felt the early episodes' fight sequences were "filmed beautifully" and enjoyed that they featured little CGI, while also calling Henson "perfectly cast and endlessly amusing" as Nelson.

Eric Eisenberg of CinemaBlend also had positive thoughts on the initial episodes, saying, "It's smart, entertaining, and has moments so shocking that you'll have to repress screams. Suffice it to say, Marvel and Netflix have another big winner on their respective plates," while also praising the acting. Speaking of the first two episodes, Mark Hughes of Forbes added additional praise, saying, "Quite simply, in Daredevil Marvel delivers one of the greatest live-action superhero origin stories ever made. It is in the same top-tier category of true superhero origin films along with Batman Begins, Iron Man, and Superman: The Movie". Hughes stated that if the first two episodes were released in theaters with only minor tweaks, they "would've been hailed as one of Marvel's best films to date". Mike Hale at The New York Times was less positive about the series, calling it ordinary, but admitting having high expectations due to his love for the comics, and admiring the care and seriousness with which the series was made. He called the series pace "leisurely", but "a pleasant change from the norm", and called Cox's performance "divided", praising him as Murdock and criticizing him as Daredevil. Hale was positive about the cast overall, and ultimately surmised that after seeing the first five episodes, Daredevil is "eminently watchable", but not the Daredevil he remembered from the comics.

After reviewing each of the individual episodes, IGN reviewer Matt Fowler gave the entire first season a score of 9 out of 10, indicating an "Amazing" season, saying that though it may have "spun a few wheels" while building up to its endgame, the series was "a thrilling, ultra-satisfying take on Daredevil's material and lore. One that, like Favreau's first Iron Man film, helped breathe new life and fandom into a somewhat B-tier Marvel character." He particularly praised D'Onofrio's performance, the "edgy" fight sequences, the fact that the hero himself got "beat on – a lot", and the unique dark take on the MCU. Liz Shannon Miller, reviewing the season for IndieWire, graded it a "B+", and though feeling that it did not quite live up to DeKnight's admitted influence, The Wire, praised the series, noting its characters and development, and the performances of the entire cast, especially those of D'Onofrio, Curtis-Hall, and Cox. She was positive about the level of violence the series depicted, and all of its "brutal" and "beautiful" fight sequences, as well as the way that the series explores the consequences for average people of events from the films, while committing to building its own universe within the already established MCU. Alan Sepinwall of HitFix also praised the cast and characters, particularly D'Onofrio, and felt that series benefited from having a much narrower focus than the Marvel films or other series. He did wish that Murdock's "world on fire"-sight was used more often, and felt that the classic Daredevil costume, which "may not translate well to live-action", could use "some tweaks".

=== Accolades ===
Cox was honored at the American Foundation for the Blind's 19th Annual Helen Keller Achievement Awards, for those "that have demonstrated outstanding achievement in improving quality of life for people with vision loss". The series' main title sequence, created initially for this season, won the Online Film & Television Association's award for the Best New Titles Sequence, and was nominated for the Creative Arts Emmy Award for Outstanding Main Title Design, which went to Manhattan.

The season was included on multiple Best and Top TV shows of 2015 lists, ranking on People's (1st, along with Jessica Jones), Business Insider's (3rd), TV Guide and Digital Spy's (7th), and Slate Magazine's (23rd). It also was included on Vanity Fair' Best New TV Shows of 2015 list. Daredevil's first season was the seventh trending television show search on Google for 2015.

| Year | Award | Category | Nominee(s) | Result | Ref. |
|---|---|---|---|---|---|
| 2015 | Camerimage | Best Cinematography – Pilot | "Into the Ring" | Nominated | |
| 2015 | EWwy Awards | Best Supporting Actor in a Drama Series | Vincent D'Onofrio | Nominated | |
| 2015 | Helen Keller Achievement Award | Honoree | Charlie Cox | Won | |
| 2015 | Online Film & Television Association Award | Best New Titles Sequence | Daredevil | Won | |
| 2015 | Primetime Creative Arts Emmy Awards | Outstanding Main Title Design | Daredevil | Nominated | |
| 2015 | Primetime Creative Arts Emmy Awards | Outstanding Sound Editing for a Series | "Speak of the Devil" | Nominated | |
| 2015 | Primetime Creative Arts Emmy Awards | Outstanding Special and Visual Effects in a Supporting Role | "Speak of the Devil" | Nominated | |
| 2015 | Screen Actors Guild Awards | Outstanding Performance by a Stunt Ensemble in a Television Series | Daredevil | Nominated | |
| 2016 | Empire Awards | Best TV Series | Daredevil | Nominated | |
| 2016 | Golden Reel Awards | Outstanding Achievement in Sound Editing – Dialogue and ADR for Episodic Short Form Broadcast Media | Daredevil | Nominated | |
| 2016 | Saturn Awards | Best Supporting Actor on Television | Vincent D'Onofrio | Nominated | |
| 2016 | Saturn Awards | Best Guest Starring Role on Television | Scott Glenn | Nominated | |
| 2016 | Saturn Awards | Best Actor on Television | Charlie Cox | Nominated | |
| 2016 | Saturn Awards | Best New Media Television Series | Daredevil | Won | |
| 2016 | SXSW Film Festival | Excellence in Title Design | Daredevil | Nominated | |
| 2016 | Visual Effects Society Awards | Outstanding Supporting Visual Effects in a Photoreal Episode | "Speak of the Devil" | Nominated | |
