= Marco Ramirez (writer) =

American television writer and playwright

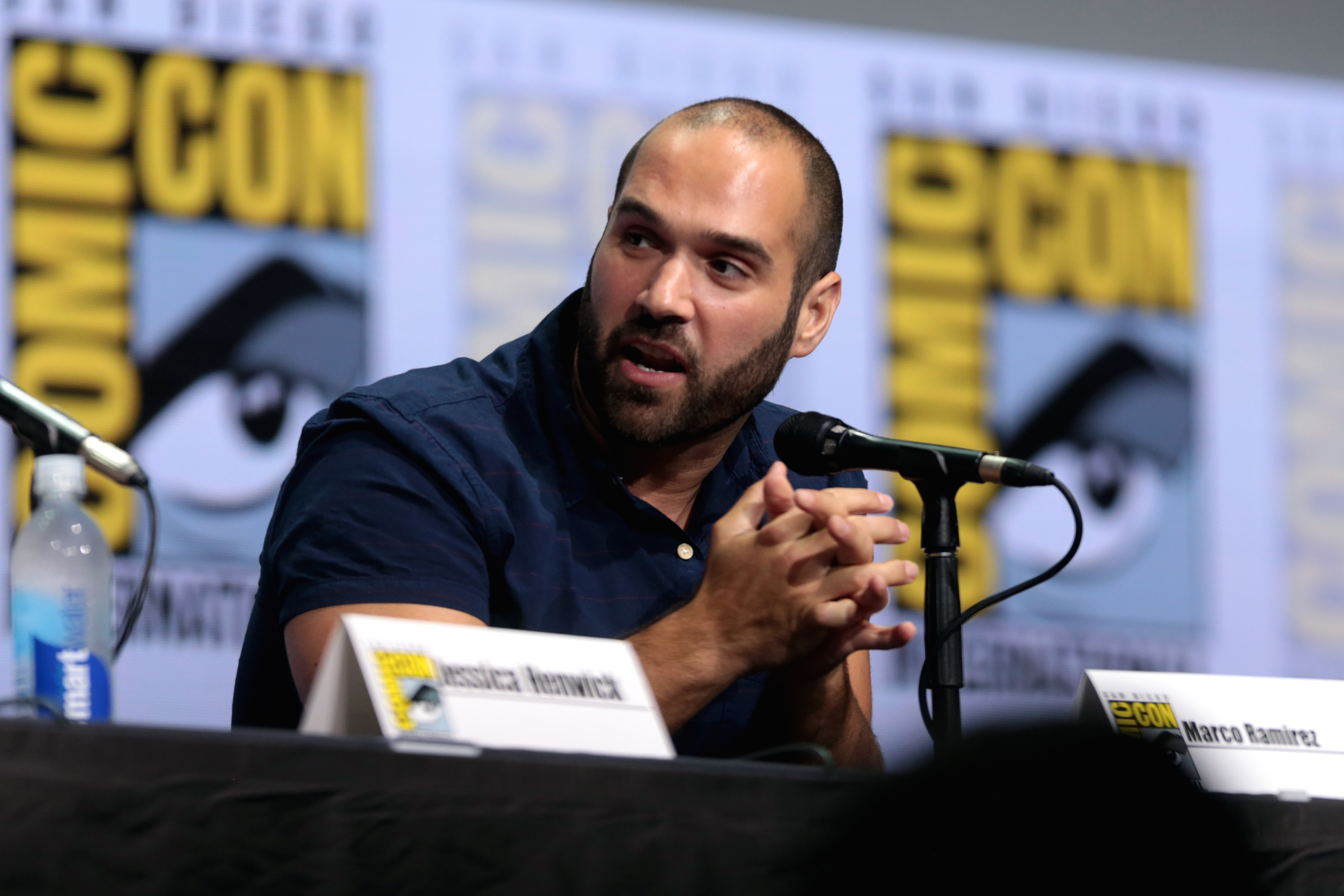
Ramirez at the 2017 San Diego Comic-Con

Marco Ramirez is an American television producer, screenwriter, and playwright who is best known for his work on the Netflix shows Daredevil and The Defenders, and for co-creating the revival of The Twilight Zone.

== Career ==
His writing credits include Sons of Anarchy, Orange Is the New Black, and Fear the Walking Dead. Ramirez worked as both a writer and producer for the first two seasons of Da Vinci's Demons. He began his work on the first season of the Netflix show Daredevil as a writer and executive producer. Alongside Douglas Petrie, he took over as the series' showrunner for the second season, and April 2016, they were announced as the creators of the Marvel crossover miniseries The Defenders. Ramirez worked with Simon Kinberg and Jordan Peele to create the third revival of the CBS science fiction anthology series The Twilight Zone.

Outside television, Ramirez wrote his debut Off Broadway play called The Royale, which premiered at the Lincoln Center Theater in 2016. Since then, he has received Drama Desk and Helen Hayes nominations, and won the Outer Critics Circle’s John Gassner Playwriting Award for the play.

Ramirez also wrote the book for the musical Buena Vista Social Club, based on the album of the same name, which premiered on Broadway in 2025. He was nominated for a Tony Award for Best Book of a Musical for his work on the show.

In May 2025, it was announced that Ramirez would act as showrunner for a television series titled Delphi. The series is a spin-off of Creed film series.
