= The Defenders (miniseries) =

2017 Marvel Television miniseries

- Genre: Action; Drama; Superhero
- Created by: Douglas Petrie; Marco Ramirez
- Based on: Daredevil by; Stan Lee; Bill Everett; Jessica Jones by; Brian Michael Bendis; Michael Gaydos; Luke Cage by; Archie Goodwin; George Tuska; Roy Thomas; John Romita; Iron Fist by; Roy Thomas; Gil Kane
- Showrunner: Marco Ramirez
- Starring: Charlie Cox; Krysten Ritter; Mike Colter; Finn Jones; Eka Darville; Elden Henson; Jessica Henwick; Simone Missick; Rachael Taylor; Deborah Ann Woll; Élodie Yung; Rosario Dawson; Sigourney Weaver; Scott Glenn; Ramón Rodríguez
- Composer: John Paesano
- Country of origin: United States
- Original language: English
- No. of seasons: 1
- No. of episodes: 8

Production
- Executive producers: S. J. Clarkson; Cindy Holland; Allie Goss; Alison Engel; Kris Henigman; Alan Fine; Stan Lee; Joe Quesada; Karim Zreik; Jim Chory; Jeph Loeb; Drew Goddard; Douglas Petrie; Marco Ramirez
- Producer: Evan Perazzo
- Production location: New York City
- Cinematography: Matthew J. Lloyd; Jim McMillan
- Editors: Jonathan Chibnall; Miklos Wright; Michael Knue
- Running time: 44–55 minutes
- Production companies: Marvel Television; ABC Studios; Goddard Textiles; Nine and a Half Fingers, Inc.

Original release
- Network: Netflix
- Release: August 18, 2017

Related
- Marvel's Netflix television series

Marvel's The Defenders is an American television miniseries created by Douglas Petrie and Marco Ramirez for the streaming service Netflix, based on the Marvel Comics characters Daredevil, Jessica Jones, Luke Cage, and Iron Fist, who form the superhero team the Defenders. It is set in the Marvel Cinematic Universe (MCU), sharing continuity with the franchise's films. The miniseries is a crossover event and the culmination of four previously released interconnected series from Marvel and Netflix starring each superhero. It was produced by Marvel Television in association with ABC Studios, Nine and a Half Fingers, Inc., and Goddard Textiles, with Ramirez serving as showrunner.

The series stars Charlie Cox as Matt Murdock / Daredevil, Krysten Ritter as Jessica Jones, Mike Colter as Luke Cage, and Finn Jones as Danny Rand / Iron Fist, all reprising their roles from their individual series. It also stars Eka Darville, Elden Henson, Jessica Henwick, Simone Missick, Rachael Taylor, Deborah Ann Woll, Élodie Yung, Rosario Dawson, Scott Glenn, and Ramón Rodríguez, all also returning from previous series, as well as Sigourney Weaver. Development began in late 2013, with Cox the first actor cast in May 2014. Petrie and Ramirez joined as showrunners in April, after doing so for the second season of Daredevil. Petrie left with the start of filming, which took place in New York City from October 2016 to March 2017. Cinematography and design work established the different color palettes from the characters' individual series, and combined them as the team is formed.

The Defenders premiered in New York on July 31, 2017, with all eight episodes released on Netflix on August 18. Critics were mostly positive about the crossover, highlighting the dynamics between the different Defenders as well as Weaver's performance, but were generally disappointed with the overall story, pacing, and the use of the Hand as villains. Third-party analysis indicated that the miniseries was the least-viewed Marvel Netflix series so far and had the largest week-over-week drop in viewership of them all, though it was the third-most "Binge Raced" series globally at the time of its release, according to Netflix. It received several award nominations. The Defenders, along with the other Marvel Netflix series, was removed from Netflix on March 1, 2022, after Disney regained the license for the series, and began streaming on Disney+ from March 16.

== Premise ==
Set a few months after the second season of Daredevil, and a month after the first season of Iron Fist, the vigilantes Daredevil, Jessica Jones, Luke Cage, and Iron Fist team up in New York City to fight a common enemy, the Hand.

== Cast and characters ==
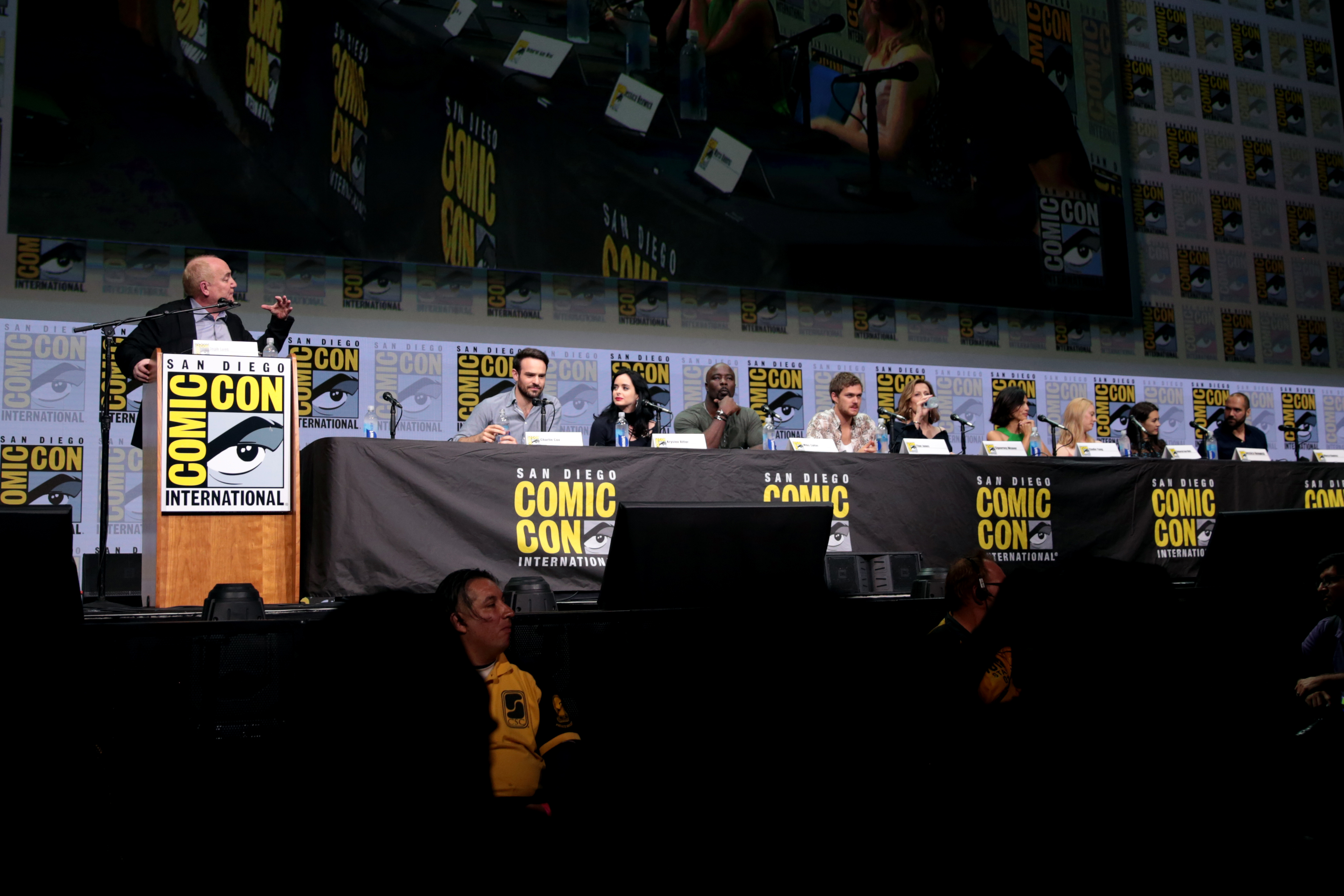
Cast and crew of The Defenders at the 2017 San Diego Comic-Con. From left to right: executive producer Jeph Loeb, stars Charlie Cox, Krysten Ritter, Mike Colter, Finn Jones, Sigourney Weaver, Elodie Yung, Deborah Ann Woll, and Jessica Henwick, and showrunner Marco Ramirez.

=== Main ===
- Charlie Cox as Matt Murdock / Daredevil:
  A blind pro-bono lawyer in Hell's Kitchen, with his remaining senses enhanced, who is secretly a vigilante. Cox felt the second season of Daredevil, in which Murdock fought alongside Elektra Natchios and Frank Castle, prepared the character to accept help in The Defenders, and that moving into the miniseries the death of Natchios would be weighing heavily on Murdock. Ramirez likened Murdock and Natchios' relationship to a more overtly sexual version of Edward Norton and Brad Pitt's characters in Fight Club (1999), with Natchios being Murdock's "burden to deal with" after she is resurrected. Cox felt that Murdock and Jessica Jones would have a "fiery relationship" in the series since both characters are "quite opinionated and quite stubborn".
- Krysten Ritter as Jessica Jones:
  A private investigator suffering from post-traumatic stress disorder who runs her own agency, Alias Investigations. Ritter felt it would be interesting to see what forces Jones to team up with the other heroes, since she is against being a superhero and "doesn't want anything to do with that." She added that at the start of the series, Jones is still dealing with the aftermath of killing Kilgrave at the end of the first season of Jessica Jones, and has not adjusted to the increase in the number of people wanting to hire her since then. Showrunner Marco Ramirez noted that Jones would struggle with letting "three men into her life who she doesn't 100 percent trust". Ritter said that Jones and Murdock would have a "cat and mouse" dynamic.
- Mike Colter as Luke Cage:
  A former convict with superhuman strength and unbreakable skin who now fights crime in Harlem. Colter felt that none of the Defenders seemed like they would want to be in a superhero group together, and said that Cage specifically is "in his own world". He added that Cage's imprisonment at the end of the first season of Luke Cage would be dealt with at the beginning of the miniseries, taking away a "big burden to bear ... Now that that's out of the way, I think we can give him a different approach to life." Colter said Cage would act as "the conciliator" for the group as well as a mentor to Danny Rand; pairing Rand with Cage is a homage to the Heroes for Hire comics, which Colter thought was cool and had a "wisdom-versus-youth quality".
- Finn Jones as Danny Rand / Iron Fist:
  A billionaire Buddhist monk, co-CEO of Rand Enterprises, and martial arts expert with the ability to call upon the mystical power of the Iron Fist. Jones said Rand is the driving force of the group as he "knows how serious this situation is". Jones felt the combination of the first season of Iron Fist and The Defenders formed "the complete first season of Danny's journey", with the latter seeing him become untrusting due to the events of the former. Rand is influenced by the other Defenders, who are older than him and are examples of heroes who "manage to keep their shit together". In particular, Colter said Rand has "an exuberance ... that Luke Cage wants to temper a bit". Rand is picked on by the other Defenders, which some viewers saw as an acknowledgment of the poor reception that the first season of Iron Fist received. However, Ramirez said that season had not been released when they were making The Defenders, and that dynamic was how they naturally felt his character would be treated.
- Eka Darville as Malcolm Ducasse: Jones' neighbor and assistant at Alias Investigations.
- Elden Henson as Franklin "Foggy" Nelson: Murdock's close friend and former law partner who now works with Jeri Hogarth.
- Jessica Henwick as Colleen Wing: A former member of the Hand, Rand's lover, and the owner of a New York City dojo.
- Simone Missick as Misty Knight: A Harlem police detective part of a citywide task force who is Cage's ally.
- Rachael Taylor as Trish Walker: Jones' adoptive sister and best friend who hosts her own radio talk show.
- Deborah Ann Woll as Karen Page: Murdock's close friend and former secretary, and a burgeoning newspaper reporter.
- Élodie Yung as Elektra Natchios:
  A mysterious and dangerous woman from Murdock's past, who is the Black Sky, a weapon of the Hand. Executive producer Jeph Loeb had wanted to adapt the storyline featuring Natchios' resurrection from the comics, and Ramirez felt that it should happen in The Defenders after the writers of Daredevil came to the "organic" decision to kill the character at the end of that series' second season. Yung called Natchios "an amnesiac [who] doesn't remember who she is or anything about her past life", with the question being how much of the original character remains following Alexandra's training. Sigourney Weaver, who portrays Alexandra, described the characters' relationship as "unusual".
- Rosario Dawson as Claire Temple: A former nurse who gives medical aid to vigilantes, and is Cage's lover.
- Sigourney Weaver as Alexandra:
  One of the five "fingers" of the Hand and its leader. Weaver called the character "really smart", "very in charge", and more of an adversary than a villain. Ramirez described her as "a survivor" and "a very powerful force in New York City", adding, "She's everything Sigourney is: sophisticated, intellectual, dangerous"; the antagonist of the series had to be "something massive to pull these four [hero] characters from their individual worlds to work together". Alexandra is "charmed" by the four heroes teaming up against her, having "never met four people who are seemingly just interested in taking care of this one little part of New York ... they're unlike anybody she's ever faced off against before". Weaver worked with the writers to avoid a cliché portrayal, specifically "terms like 'ice queen' that are often thrown at women who aren't completely sympathetic". It was important to Ramirez and Weaver to introduce Alexandra sympathetically. The character is ultimately a supporting player for Natchios' overall story, with Ramirez saying that the writers were able to create a "really fun cool character" for Weaver to portray, but they did so in service of Natchios and the journey that she goes on.
- Scott Glenn as Stick: Murdock's mentor and leader of the Chaste who wages a war against the Hand.
- Ramón Rodríguez as Bakuto: One of the five "fingers" of the Hand, and Wing's former sensei.

=== Recurring ===
- Wai Ching Ho as Gao: One of the five "fingers" of the Hand.
- J. Mallory McCree as Cole Miller: A young man from Harlem who gets involved with the Hand.
- Michelle Federer as Michelle Raymond: A woman who approaches Jones about her missing husband.
- Chloe Levine as Lexi Raymond: The daughter of John and Michelle Raymond.
- Babs Olusanmokun as Sowande: One of the five "fingers" of the Hand, who hires Harlem teenagers.
- Ron Simons as Strieber: Knight's police captain.
- Yutaka Takeuchi as Murakami: One of the five "fingers" of the Hand.

=== Guest ===
- Peter McRobbie as Paul Lantom: A Catholic priest and confidante for Murdock.
- Debbi Morgan as Delores Miller: Cole's mother.
- Marko Zaror as Shaft: A member of the Chaste.
- Carrie-Anne Moss as Jeri Hogarth: A lawyer and ally of Jones and Rand.
- Rob Morgan as Turk Barrett: A low-level criminal who crosses paths with Daredevil and Luke Cage.
- Amy Rutberg as Marci Stahl: Nelson's girlfriend and fellow lawyer.
- Susan Varon as Josie: Owner of a bar frequented by Nelson and Murdock.
- Alex Moggridge as John Raymond: An architect who gets involved with the Hand, and is investigated by Jones and Murdock.
- Nichole Yannetty as Nicole: An intern at Walker's talk show.

Stan Lee makes a cameo appearance through an on-set photograph as NYPD Captain Irving Forbush, the same photograph seen in previous Marvel Netflix series. The Aeolus Quartet also cameo as themselves, performing Johannes Brahms' First String Quartet for Alexandra.

== Episodes ==
No.	Title	Directed by	Written by	Original release date
1	"The H Word"	S. J. Clarkson	Douglas Petrie & Marco Ramirez	August 18, 2017
While hunting agents of the Hand in Cambodia, Danny Rand / Iron Fist and Colleen Wing are told that the war they are fighting is actually taking place in New York City. There, Matt Murdock has given up his life as the vigilante Daredevil and is working as a pro bono lawyer. He remains conflicted due to his feelings for Elektra Natchios, who died fighting the Hand. Luke Cage, his name cleared by Murdock's ex-partner Foggy Nelson, returns from prison to the streets of Harlem where police detective Misty Knight informs him of local kids who have been getting involved with a mysterious business and ending up dead. After learning that all her major organs are failing and she has little time to live, a woman informs her colleagues to speed up their plans, and subsequently watches with a resurrected Natchios as a large earthquake tears through New York, felt by Rand and Wing as they return, and private investigator Jessica Jones as she discovers explosives while searching for a missing husband that an anonymous caller warned her to avoid.
2	"Mean Right Hook"	S. J. Clarkson	Lauren Schmidt Hissrich & Marco Ramirez	August 18, 2017
Jones calls the police, but Knight sees her taking some evidence as she leaves the scene. Cage follows some leads on local kids, and finds them being sent to clean up a workshop where several enemies of the Hand have been murdered. Rand and Wing are also investigating the workshop, leading to a fight between Rand and Cage which only ends when the police arrive. The mysterious woman, Alexandra, is informed that her group's plans have been halted by a mystical wall. Alexandra believes this may actually be a door, and interrogates an old enemy, Stick, for answers on this. Jones is warned off her investigation by lawyer Jeri Hogarth, who later tells Nelson to keep any fallout from Jones's actions away from their firm. Jones returns to her apartment to find the missing man, John Raymond. They are attacked by Natchios, but he kills himself first. Jones chases Natchios, but is caught and arrested by Knight. Murdock soon arrives to serve as Jones's lawyer, having made an agreement with Nelson to carry out some of his extra work.
3	"Worst Behavior"	Peter Hoar	Lauren Schmidt Hissrich & Douglas Petrie	August 18, 2017
Months ago, the Hand acquired the ancient weapon Black Sky—the body of Natchios—and used the last of their resources to resurrect her. Under Alexandra's tutelage, the Black Sky was prepared to fight as a weapon against the Hand's enemies. Now, Jones dismisses Murdock's help, but he becomes interested in her case and begins investigating it himself. Cage tells his girlfriend Claire Temple about his fight with Rand, whom she knows. Temple arranges a meeting between the two, hoping they can work together to fight the Hand, but they clash over their respective backgrounds. Inspired by some of Cage's comments, Rand decides to take a different approach and uses his corporate influence to find the Hand's new front, Midland Circle. Cage visits the mother of one of the local kids the Hand had hired, while Jones investigates Raymond's job. They also learn of a connection to Midland Circle. Cage arrives there to help Rand fight the Hand, soon followed by Jones and Murdock. They are attacked by the Black Sky, but Rand drives her off.
4	"Royal Dragon"	Phil Abraham	Douglas Petrie & Marco Ramirez	August 18, 2017
Rand, Cage, Jones, and Murdock escape and hide in a nearby restaurant. With everyone introduced, Rand proposes that they work as a team to defeat the Hand, but Murdock is unwilling to get involved and Jones leaves. Stick escapes from the Hand and finds the group, having already known Murdock and known of Rand. He explains that a long time ago the elders of K'un-Lun came together to study the healing powers of qi, but five among them wished to use this power to live forever and were cast out. They became the five fingers of the Hand, and include Alexandra (who has gone by many names through the centuries), Madame Gao, Sowande (who has been recruiting the Harlem kids), Murakami, and the recently deceased Bakuto. Now the Hand has defeated all that oppose them, except for Stick and the Iron Fist. Alexandra arrives and offers to spare New York if Rand leaves with her, since their plan requires the Iron Fist, but he rejects her offer. Jones realizes that the Raymond family is still in danger, and returns to help as the Black Sky attacks.
5	"Take Shelter"	Uta Briesewitz	Lauren Schmidt Hissrich, Douglas Petrie & Marco Ramirez	August 18, 2017
The Hand converges on the restaurant, and Murdock lures the Black Sky away from the fight. When he calls her Elektra, she flees, but not before preventing Murakami from killing Murdock. Cage is able to kidnap Sowande while the others escape. After Sowande warns that their loved ones will be targeted next, they convince their friends to stay with Knight at the police precinct until they are out of danger. While doing this, Wing is confronted by a resurrected Bakuto, who unsuccessfully attempts to recruit her to his cause after raising her as a member of the Hand before she met and joined with Rand. Murdock decides to take up his Daredevil identity once again, something that concerns the leaders of the Hand due to his relationship with Natchios. Murakami questions Alexandra's reliance on the Black Sky to complete their goals and notes that they can all be killed now that their resources were used on Natchios. He suggests that they devise a new plan without Alexandra. Stick decapitates Sowande when he attempts to escape capture.
6	"Ashes, Ashes"	Stephen Surjik	Drew Goddard & Marco Ramirez	August 18, 2017
Now realizing that the Hand wants the Iron Fist as a key to unlock something, the group decides to hide Rand away while they continue the fight. However, Rand disagrees and attacks the others. They stop him, and tie him up, with Cage and Stick watching over him while Jones and Murdock continue the investigation of Raymond. Natchios begins to regain memories of her previous life, but Alexandra insists that she is not that person anymore. Meanwhile, the other leaders of the Hand learn of Sowande's death, and continue to lose faith in Alexandra's leadership. Murdock and Jones learn that there is something beneath Midland Circle, a hole which Murdock had come across previously when dealing with the Hand. They return to the group with plans of attacking the building, to find Stick attempting to murder Rand to keep the Hand from using him. They are interrupted by Natchios, who kills Stick and takes Rand. Alexandra gloats to the other leaders about this victory, but is murdered herself by Natchios, who claims leadership of the Hand.
7	"Fish in the Jailhouse"	Félix Enríquez Alcalá	Lauren Schmidt Hissrich & Marco Ramirez	August 18, 2017
Jones, Murdock, and Cage wake up in the police precinct as suspects for the murders of Sowande and Stick. They tell Knight about the Hand, but try not to go into the details or let her get involved, much to the chagrin of her superiors. The remaining fingers of the Hand agree to let Natchios pursue her goals, hoping that she will grant them access to the substance they need to avoid death. She takes Rand below the building to the mystical door that they need him to open. Jones, Murdock, and Cage escape the precinct and go to Midland Circle, where they are confronted by Gao, Bakuto, and Murakami. Wing soon arrives to help, bringing with her the explosives that Raymond had been stockpiling. The group drives the fingers of the Hand away. Knight and Temple arrive soon after, and Knight agrees to stall the police while the others get to Rand. Natchios tricks Rand into opening the door, causing a blast that knocks out power throughout the city. Rand awakens beneath the skeleton of a dragon.
8	"The Defenders"	Farren Blackburn	Lauren Schmidt Hissrich & Marco Ramirez	August 18, 2017
Gao explains to Rand that the substance that the Hand uses for resurrection comes from the bones of dragons, just as his Iron Fist abilities came from a dragon. The Hand begins harvesting the skeleton, which will weaken the foundations of the city and cause widespread destruction. Wing and Temple place the explosives so as to destroy the building once the others escape. They are confronted by Bakuto, who cuts off Knight's arm when she arrives to help. Wing decapitates Bakuto, but his body sets off the timer for the explosives. Jones, Murdock, and Cage arrive in the cavern to help Rand, and they fight the members of the Hand together. When Murdock realizes that the explosives are about to go off, he gets the others to leave immediately. He remains to plead with Natchios, and the two are together—along with Gao and Murakami—as the building implodes around them. These events are all covered up by authorities. Rand, Jones, and Cage look to move on and protect the city. A battered Murdock later wakes up in a room with a nun at his side.

== Production ==
=== Development ===
In October 2013, Deadline Hollywood reported that Marvel Television was preparing four drama series and a miniseries, totaling 60 episodes, to present to video on demand services and cable providers, with Netflix, Amazon, and WGN America expressing interest. A few weeks later, it was announced that Marvel Television and ABC Studios would provide Netflix with live action series centered around Daredevil, Jessica Jones, Luke Cage, and Iron Fist, leading up to a miniseries based on the Defenders. In November 2015, Marvel Comics' editor-in-chief Joe Quesada stated there was no apprehension from Marvel in changing the line up of the Defenders from the "classic" original line-up (Doctor Strange, Hulk, Namor and Silver Surfer) because "to the world at large, no one knows who the Defenders are. So the idea of taking the concept and name and applying it to [the Marvel Cinematic Universe (MCU)] feels wholly natural" adding there was "a wonderful concept" behind why the group would form in the MCU and why they would be called the Defenders.

In April 2016, it was announced that Douglas Petrie and Marco Ramirez, the showrunners for the second season of Daredevil, would serve as showrunners and executive producers on Marvel's The Defenders. Daredevil creator Drew Goddard also serves as an executive producer on the miniseries, along with Karim Zreik, Cindy Holland, Allie Goss, Alison Engel, Kris Henigman, Alan Fine, Stan Lee, Joe Quesada, Jim Chory, and Marvel Television head Jeph Loeb. S. J. Clarkson, director of the miniseries' first two episodes, also serves as an executive producer on the first episode. In July 2016, Loeb confirmed that the miniseries would consist of eight episodes, and stated that Petrie and Ramirez would consult with Melissa Rosenberg, Cheo Hodari Coker, and Scott Buck—the showrunners of Jessica Jones, Luke Cage, and Iron Fist, respectively—on how their characters would act; the other showrunners read each of the scripts for The Defenders and provided insight into each individual character's world. On this collaboration, Petrie said of Rosenberg specifically that she was "wonderful because she's in this position of being a fellow artist and letting us do what we do, but at the same time loving her character and being protective of her character and wanting us to get it right". Rosenberg said that she and the other showrunners "felt really included in the process". Loeb compared this relationship to Joss Whedon consulting with the filmmakers of the MCU's Phase One films before directing the crossover film The Avengers (2012). At the start of filming in October 2016, Petrie left the series as co-showrunner. Loeb explained, "We got to a point where the scripts were done, and we wanted Marco to continue, and Doug pursued other avenues."

=== Writing ===
By late May 2016, Petrie and Ramirez had turned in a completed story for the miniseries, based on a "very bare-bones structure" from Loeb. Petrie and Ramirez went through a "trapeze act" to have the story work for viewers who had not seen the previous series, while also not have redundant moments of exposition for those who had. Petrie said the miniseries would be a "detour" for the characters, allowing them to return to the worlds of their own series at the end, making it equivalent to Daredevil season 2.5, Luke Cage season 1.5, Jessica Jones season 1.5, and Iron Fist season 1.5. Loeb compared the miniseries to the Olympics, where "you get to know all of these athletes in their various sports [and then] they're going to get together", while Coker further compared it to the forming of the Wu-Tang Clan or Voltron.

There's a recurring theme here with people who are orphans or people who don't understand this urge but feel the need to do good and are constantly fighting inner turmoil ... We didn't think about it in terms of how we'll combine all the tones.

— Showrunner Marco Ramirez on combining elements from the individual series to craft the tone of The Defenders

Ramirez and Petrie wanted the project to feel earned, grounded, and topical like the individual series, rather than "a corporate mandate". Goddard noted that each of the individual series have different tones, and combining them for the miniseries created a different one. Finding this new tone was the most challenging aspect of the project for Ramirez. Scenes in the early episodes were created to feel like the "most optimal versions" of each individual series, using visual and sonic elements from each that are slowly combined as the miniseries goes on. Loeb cautioned against the "easy comparison" to The Avengers, noting that lessons would be taken from that crossover such as how that team did not come together right away, but unlike the Avengers in the film, the Defenders do not operate out of one location such as Avengers Tower or have matching costumes. The Dirty Dozen (1967), Seven Samurai (1954), and other films "where characters came together who did not want to come together" were bigger influences on the project than The Avengers.

Choosing an antagonist for the miniseries was another challenge, according to Ramirez. Loeb did not want a villain like the aliens from The Avengers because these are "street level heroes [who] come from a very real place", but each of the Defenders has been shown to be "really powerful" in their individual series and the antagonist would have to prove a challenge for the four of them together. Ramirez also felt that the antagonist should be a common denominator rather than having individual villains combining from each series. They settled on the overarching organization of the Hand, and have the characters following individual investigations that lead them to converge on the same location. It was subsequently important to Ramirez that the Hand be destroyed by the end of the miniseries, to give it a definitive ending and to allow the individual characters, especially Iron Fist, to move on to new stories and adversaries. To give something unexpected to the audience, the focus of the story is ultimately revealed to be Elektra Natchios, and her journey of rejecting the people in her life who have told her what to do. This includes her mentor Stick and the miniseries' apparent central antagonist Alexandra, both of whom she murders, as well as Daredevil. Ramirez said that the theme of "having to embrace the identity you want" also applies to the four Defenders. He added that Elektra murdering Alexandra made more sense than one of the Defenders doing it, as the writers felt that none of the Defenders were murderous and would have to be pushed into doing it.

Regarding where the miniseries leaves the Defenders, Ramirez compared their relationship to "people who were on the same bus when it got in an accident ... it's kind of like, 'This was a great adventure to have with you, I'd be okay with seeing you again, I'd also be okay with never seeing you again.'" The final image of The Defenders, in which Murdock wakes up with a nun by his side, is an homage to a panel from the Daredevil story arc "Born Again" (1986). The nun calling for "Maggie" is an implied reference to Murdock's mother, which Ramirez would not confirm at the time of miniseries' release. He did note that this scene along with several others from Daredevil's story in the miniseries was a direct homage to the comics, and that this panel from "Born Again" was one of his favorite Daredevil panels. Ramirez explained that the scene was included because a third season of Daredevil had already been announced, and they did not want to make the audience think they "were trying to cheat them or convince them of something that's not happening".

=== Casting ===
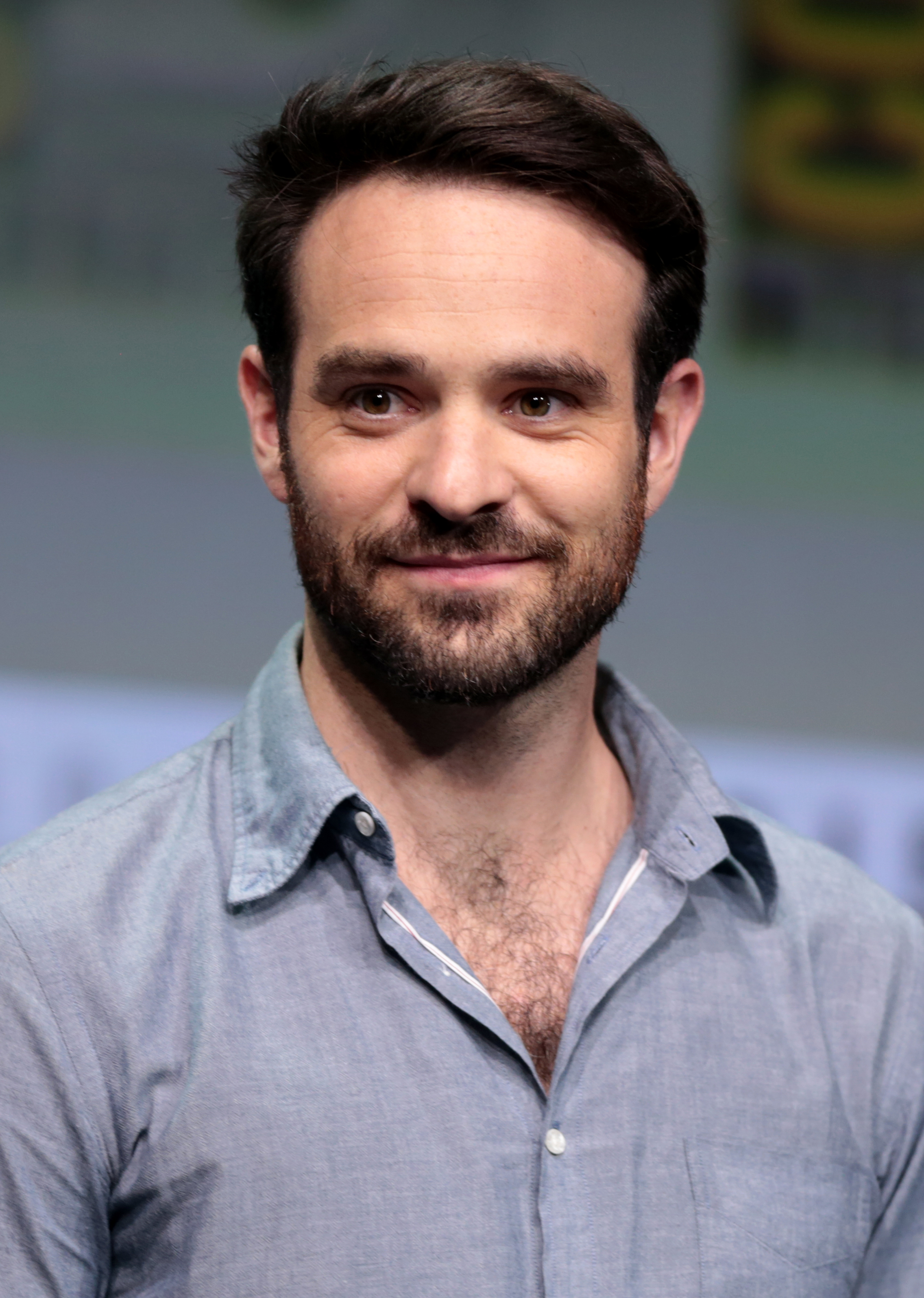
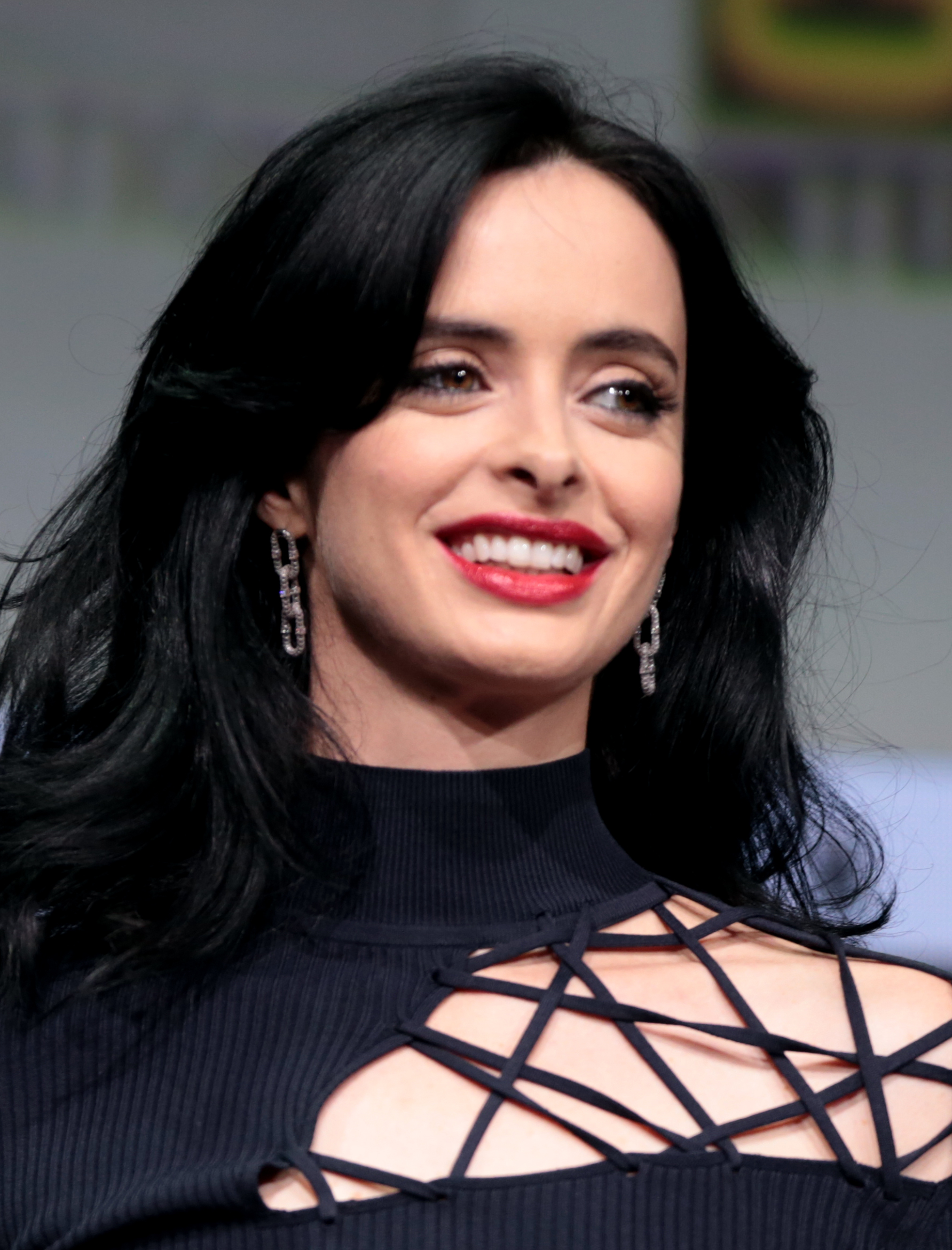
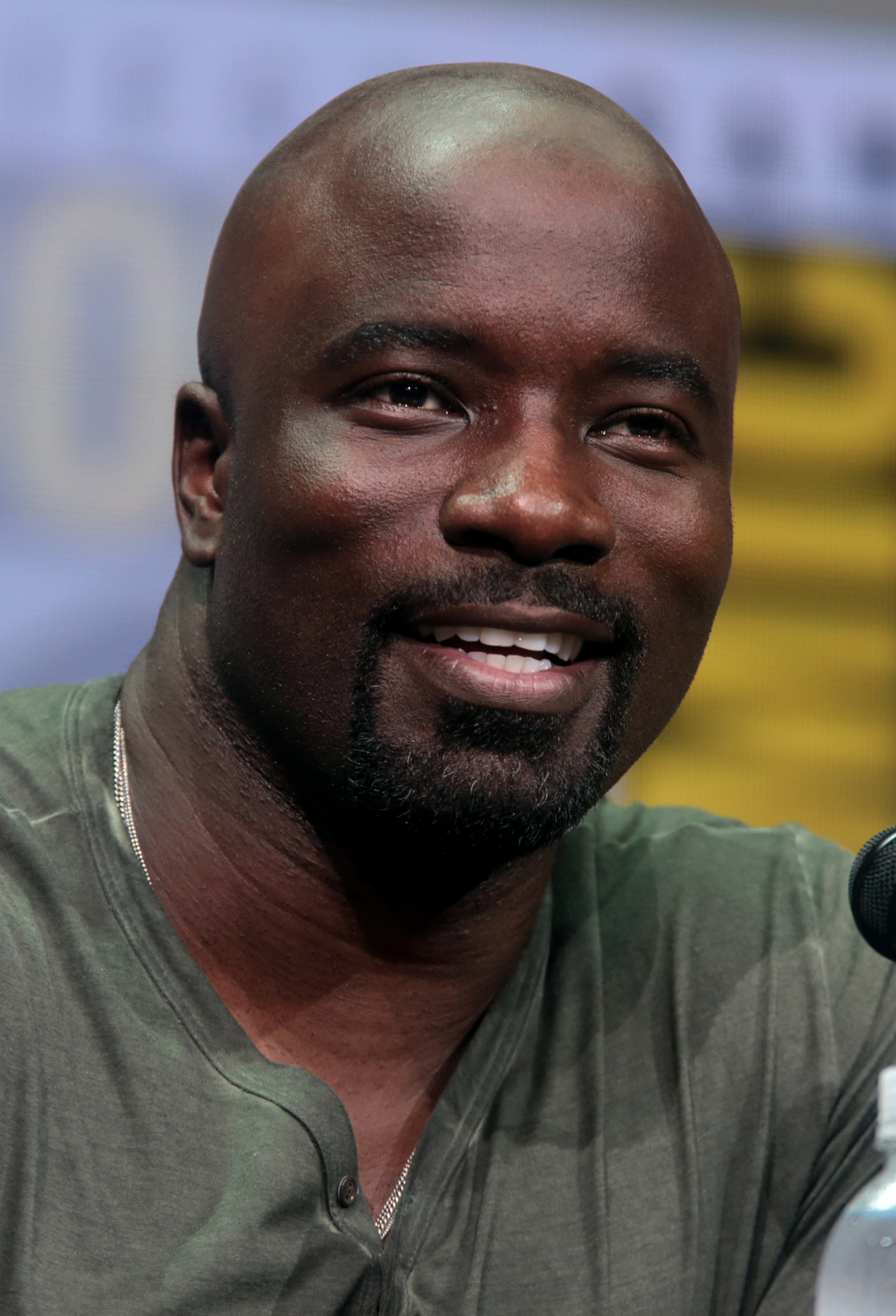
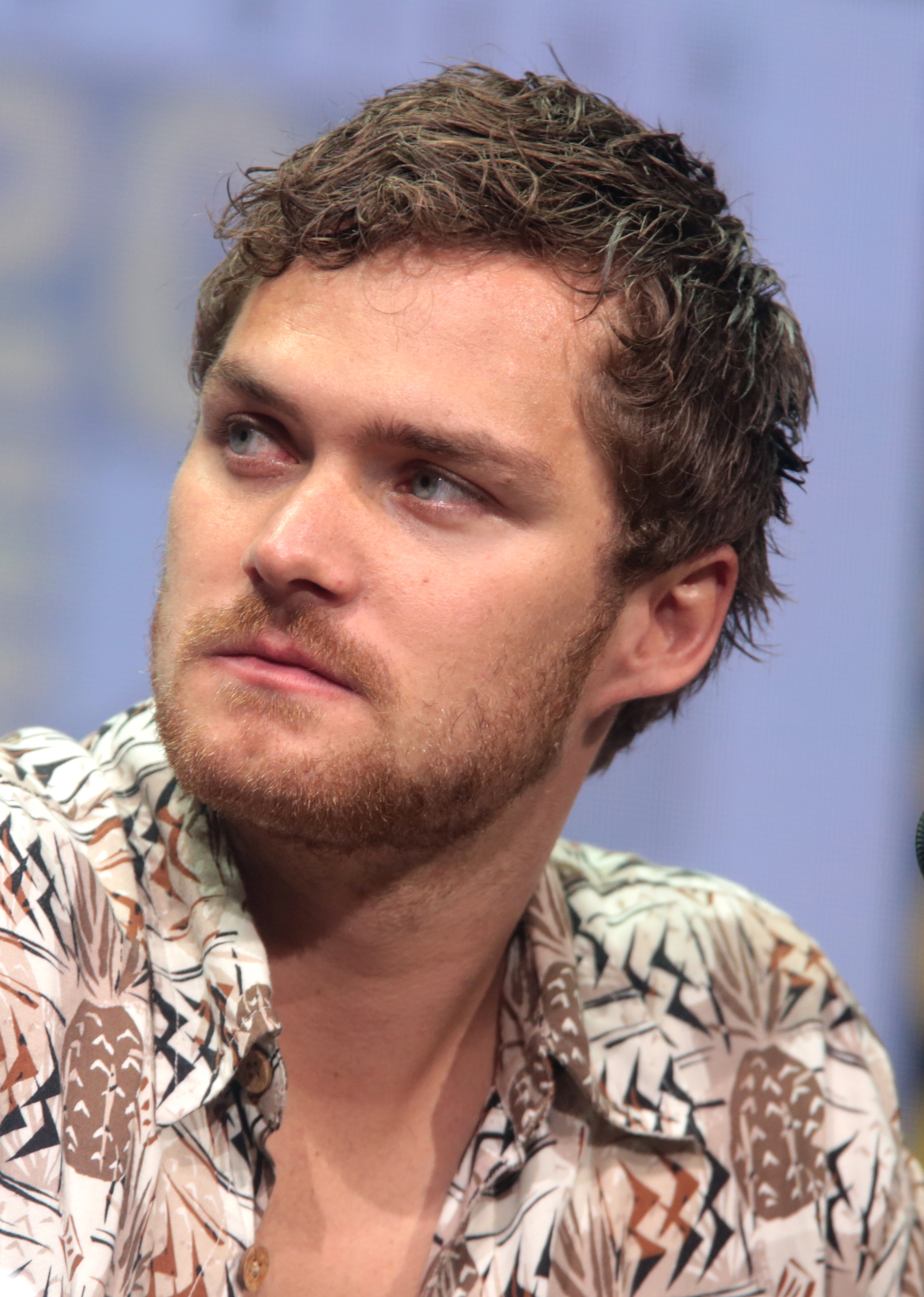
Charlie Cox, Krysten Ritter, Mike Colter, and Finn Jones reprise their roles from previous Marvel Netflix series to star as the Defenders.

At the end of May 2014, Charlie Cox was cast as Matt Murdock / Daredevil for Daredevil. In December 2014, Krysten Ritter was cast as Jessica Jones and Mike Colter was cast as Luke Cage for Jessica Jones, with Colter also headlining Luke Cage. In February 2016, Finn Jones was reported to be cast as Danny Rand / Iron Fist for Iron Fist, being confirmed the following month. They also confirmed that Cox, Ritter, Colter, and Jones would all reprise their roles to star in The Defenders.

In March 2016, Élodie Yung, who portrays Elektra Natchios in Daredevil, expressed interest in appearing in The Defenders as an antagonist, and Eka Darville said a month later that he would reprise his Jessica Jones role of Malcolm Ducasse in The Defenders. In September, Simone Missick said she would be reprising the role of Misty Knight from Luke Cage in the miniseries. After production began in October, it was confirmed that Darville, Missick, and Yung would appear, alongside Daredevil actors Deborah Ann Woll as Karen Page, Elden Henson as Foggy Nelson, and Scott Glenn as Stick; Jessica Jones's Rachael Taylor as Trish Walker; and Iron Fist's Jessica Henwick as Colleen Wing. Ramón Rodríguez also reprises his Iron Fist role as Bakuto, while Rosario Dawson returns as Claire Temple from all of the previous Marvel Netflix series.

At New York Comic Con in October, Sigourney Weaver was announced to be playing the main antagonist of the miniseries, later revealed to be Alexandra. The producers had referred to the character as "a Sigourney Weaver type" for four months before Loeb contacted her about the project. Additionally, J. Mallory McCree recurs as Cole; Michelle Federer and Chloë Levine portray Michelle and Lexi Raymond; and Ron Simons appears as police captain Strieber. Babs Olusanmokun and Yutaka Takeuchi portray Sowande and Murakami, respectively, both being leaders of the Hand.

Other actors reprising their roles for the miniseries include Daredevil's Wai Ching Ho as Madame Gao, Peter McRobbie as Father Paul Lantom, Amy Rutberg as Marci Stahl, and Susan Varon as Josie; Jessica Jones' Carrie-Anne Moss as Jeri Hogarth and Nichole Yannetty as Nicole; and Rob Morgan as Turk Barrett, from previous Marvel Netflix series.

=== Design ===
Director S. J. Clarkson, cinematographer Matthew J. Lloyd, production designer Loren Weeks, and costume designer Stephanie Maslansky worked together to create distinct color palettes for each of the characters, maintaining the looks from their individual series, rather than attempting to blend the looks of all the different series for the miniseries. Maslansky explained that the palettes were used for the lighting, sets and locations, and costumes for the lead characters as well as extras. When the characters begin to crossover, so do the colors, and decisions were made regarding which colors come to the foreground and which are seen less on a scene-by-scene basis.

External videos
- The opening title sequence of The Defenders, showcasing Elastic's design work and composer John Paesano's main theme for the miniseries

The series' title sequence, designed by Elastic, evokes the work that the company did for the series True Detective by recreating the characters of the show out of elements of its setting: the sequence depicts the four Defenders out of colored topographical maps of New York City, showing the different areas of the city that each of them come from.

==== Cinematography ====
Clarkson, who also directed for Jessica Jones, said that series is "very dark and very steely and very blue" while Daredevil focused more on red, and so these were emphasized early on. When Murdock and Jones meet, they are in a "steely gray-blue" room to indicate that it is Jones's world, with Knight there wearing a Luke Cage-appropriate tan color, and Murdock entering and letting red into the room to show the connecting of the two characters. Clarkson was inspired by New York-set films such as The French Connection (1971), Shaft (1971), and Serpico (1973) when establishing the look of the miniseries.

Lloyd began work on the miniseries several weeks before the start of filming, taking the development work that Clarkson had already done for the project and refining it; he avoided pushing the different colors so far that they made the scenes look unrealistic, and noted that red can be an overwhelming hue on camera so limited this for the Daredevil scenes by just using it as an accent. Lloyd did not want to recreate the techniques used on the individual series that he did not work on, and instead focused on the specific looks that Clarkson desired. For Cage's scenes, Lloyd was inspired by Harris Savides work on American Gangster (2007), and for Iron Fist he looked to Wong Kar-wai's The Grandmaster (2013). Rather than dedicate a significant amount of time to color grading the footage for the project in post-production, Lloyd opted to try and create as much of the desired color palette look as possible in-camera so that he could send his scenes with some written notes to colorist Tony D'Amore of Deluxe's Encore to complete the work while Lloyd was on set. D'Amore's work was challenging in scenes that combined multiple characters as he would have to adjust specific areas of each frame depending on where the characters were. He also had to create different color grades for the high dynamic range and standard dynamic range versions of the show that are released on Netflix.

After her work on Jessica Jones, Clarkson was most comfortable working in that more grounded world and instinctively knew what lighting and camera angles to use. She was less comfortable with the world of Iron Fist and portraying the more mythological elements of that series. During pre-production on The Defenders, filming on Iron Fist was taking place. When a director from that series was not available to return to the production to reshoot a scene, Clarkson was asked to direct the new take. Clarkson found this experience "incredibly valuable", giving her a chance to work with Jones and experience the tone of his series ahead of the beginning of filming for The Defenders. Clarkson and Lloyd also learned the technical requirements for depicting the character's Iron Fist based on the process used by that series' crew, along with how the effect of Cage's abilities were created.

==== Costumes ====
Maslansky, who designed the costumes for the previous Marvel Netflix series, had the choice between designing for The Defenders or the first season of The Punisher due to a scheduling conflict between the two productions, and chose to work on The Defenders so she could create the culmination of all her work on the previous series. She described the process of highlighting the individual character's color palettes as a celebration, looking to infuse the costumes with red for Daredevil, navies and lavender for Jessica Jones, olive green for Iron Fist, and gold "Harlem colors" for Luke Cage. The characters' costumes were kept consistent with their individual series, though for Daredevil's superhero costume, which is created by Hargate Costumes in Los Angeles, the helmet was changed for The Defenders to having a matte surface that was less shiny than in Daredevil. The end of the season introduces a new costume for Iron Fist, an homage to the tracksuit that the character wears in the comics. Maslansky felt that the full tracksuit was "very '70s, a little too wise-guy, Italian mafia", and so designed a track jacket that used the classic design and colors of green with gold stripes, and paired it with cargo pants.

For Alexandra and the Hand, the executive producers suggested the color white as a repurposing of the phrase "the light at the end of the tunnel" given the group are immortal supervillains. Alexandra's costumes also feature metallic elements to suggest that she was more of a warrior in a past life and has that "fierceness or a power within her". In general, her costumes are European inspired and of "an older world" to create "a global feeling to her wardrobe, very lush ... her wardrobe reflects that kind of ancientness". The resurrected Elektra receives a new costume inspired by her comics appearance. Because it would look out of place on the streets of New York, Maslansky also designed a coat for her to cover this up that was inspired by The French Lieutenant's Woman (1981) and The Matrix (1999), and meant to appeal to Alexandra's taste in clothing.

=== Filming ===
Marvel announced in February 2014 that the miniseries would be filmed in New York City, with Marvel Comics' Editor-in-chief Joe Quesada stating in April that the show would be filming in areas of Brooklyn and Long Island City that still look like the old Hell's Kitchen, in addition to sound stage work. In April 2016, Cox confirmed a late 2016 start for filming, following the conclusion of production on Iron Fist in October 2016. Filming for The Defenders began on October 31, under the working title Group Therapy. Lloyd previously served as cinematographer for the first season of Daredevil and the first episode of Jessica Jones. Due to the production demands, he brought his long-time second unit cinematography collaborator Jim McMillan onto the miniseries to help balance the workload for when episodes were filming simultaneously. Lloyd was the primary cinematographer for The Defenders, but McMillan is credited for several episodes on which he did the most work.

Lloyd described the production of the miniseries as being more similar to a film than the previous Marvel Netflix television series due to the scheduling requirements of the larger cast and the fact that episodes would not always be shot in order due to location requirements. The schedule also demanded more days per episode for filming, so the overall production was not as significantly shorter as Lloyd had expected given the episode count is lower than the usual Netflix order of 13. Additional filming locations for the miniseries included Upper West Side, Hell's Kitchen, and Williamsburg, Brooklyn, Stapleton, Staten Island, St. Nicholas Park, the lobby and exterior of Atelier ("Midland Circle"), the Central Park Mall, the rooftop gardens at Rockefeller Center, the Downtown Manhattan Heliport, 240 Centre Street in Manhattan, the Appel Room at Time Warner Center, and the New York City Municipal Archives. It was filmed back-to-back with the second season of Jessica Jones, potentially overlapping with that production. Filming wrapped on March 19, 2017.

Lloyd shot the miniseries with the RED Weapon camera. Clarkson used a set of vintage Panavision lenses for her two episodes which she had used on Jessica Jones. The use of these lenses created issues for the series' camera team and created supply issues with Panavision, with Lloyd noting that though the use of lenses such as these are popular, they are difficult to work with. So, for the rest of the miniseries Lloyd returned to the modern Arri Master Prime lenses that he had used on Daredevil, which he said did not create a significant difference in look for the miniseries. The miniseries used a lot of steadicam work, so much that they essentially had two A-camera steadicam operators working simultaneously. Clarkson also planned out multiple cinematic "hero" shots which required complex camera movements and a lot of technocrane work.

Clarkson tried to have as much individual time with each hero as possible to help the audience understand who each character was if they had not watched all of the individual series. In addition to using color to show the characters were coming together, Clarkson tried to "twist" the episodes such as in a moment in the first episode where Cage leaves an apartment and puts his head up, which cuts to Jones entering a flat and putting her head down. Clarkson said on this, "I tried to do transitions that connected them ... so you constantly felt these world were eventually going to come together." She also used trains in transitions to show that the characters were just a train-ride away from each other, and shot the characters with the same lenses and framing to indicate that they live in the same world even with different color palettes. Particularly difficult sequences for Clarkson to shoot included the opening of the miniseries, which features a sword fight in a wet tunnel with water on set causing issues for the crew; the introduction of Matt Murdock in a courtroom, which was shot in a single take as a reference to the single take fight sequences that the character has in his series; and the earthquake scene, which combined practical effects such as "pulling all these things with strings and making everything move" with planning for visual effects and could have come across as "hokey" if done wrong.

Clarkson looked to film the action sequences in the different ways that the other series had, such as the "incredibly choreographed and ... almost balletic" fights from Daredevil, or the more "scrappy, messy" sequences from Jessica Jones. For Cage, Clarkson felt that he is "this solid, central figure that is bulletproof, is unbreakable", so she often filmed him with a static camera or steady camera, while Iron Fist was filmed in a lot more movements and with handheld cameras. The fight between the two, in the second episode, combined those two styles. In response to criticisms of the fight sequences in Iron Fist, Jones noted that he had more experience with the fighting on The Defenders due to having completed the first season of his series before beginning work on the miniseries, and had more time to learn the choreography because he was in less scenes for the ensemble project over his individual series and could rehearse in between filming. Additionally, he noted the different stunt team and directors for The Defenders allowed for improvements to be made, calling the choreography of the miniseries' action "a lot slicker" and more cohesive. However, the miniseries still had a limited television schedule, which proved especially challenging for sequences in which the Defenders all fought together, with Cox noting that on his series it is usually just him fighting stunt-men while The Defenders required all of the hero actors to learn the choreography and work around each in a limited time. They generally had a day to learn a fight, but choreography would also be changed on set.

=== Music ===
In February 2017, John Paesano was announced as the composer for the miniseries, after previously composing for the first two seasons of Daredevil. Paesano felt "there was more license to push the envelope and lean a bit more into the orchestral colors" of each character since they were "dealing with outright superheroes that [their] audience is familiar with". His score, which was a hybrid of synthesizers and a 30-piece orchestra, borrows the "color" of each character's themes from their individual series "to remind viewers of their individual personalities". The music of Johannes Brahms is used throughout the miniseries, first in the second episode where Alexandra is shown listening to a performance of his First String Quartet by the Aeolus Quartet. The scene establishes Alexandra to be "a Brahms aficionado". The composer's First Symphony is then heard as the leaders of the Hand prepare to attack the Defenders in the miniseries' fifth episode. Finally, Alexandra listens to a defective recording of Brahms' Tragic Overture.

A soundtrack album featuring Paesano's score was released digitally by Hollywood Records and Marvel Music on August 17, 2017. All music composed by John Paesano:

The Defenders: Original Soundtrack Album
No.	Title	Length
1.	"The Defenders Main Title"	1:18
2.	"Allies Aren't Alone"	3:42
3.	"Terminal"	2:39
4.	"Tailing Jones"	2:44
5.	"Board Room"	5:36
6.	"Our Weapon"	3:27
7.	"Aliasing"	1:54
8.	"Chinese Drive Through"	1:35
9.	"Restaurant Fight"	2:35
10.	"Alexandra"	3:59
11.	"Old Friends"	2:49
12.	"A Bone to Pick"	2:32
13.	"Kung Fu Party"	3:45
14.	"Protect My City"	5:36
15.	"The Defenders"	5:04
Total length:		49:15

=== Marvel Cinematic Universe tie-ins ===
The Defenders is the final series of the initially ordered Netflix series, after Daredevil, Jessica Jones, Luke Cage and Iron Fist. In August 2014, Vincent D'Onofrio, Wilson Fisk in Daredevil, stated Marvel Television planned to "branch out" after the Netflix series. In March 2015, Loeb confirmed that there was potential for the series to crossover with the MCU films and the ABC television series since they are all set in the same universe, but said they would each remain self-contained at first because "the audience needs to understand who all of these characters are and what the world is before you then start co-mingling".

Midland Circle, where the four Defenders all initially meet, was previously mentioned in the first and second seasons of Daredevil and the first season of Iron Fist. It is revealed to be an operation of the Hand, who bought the building to search for the life substance hidden beneath it. Ramirez said that after showing the Hand purchasing the building in the first season of Daredevil, and introducing the hole they were digging in Daredevil's second season, it was up to the writers on The Defenders to decide what would be in the hole. Ramirez felt that having the skeleton of a dead dragon be the source of the substance the Hand sought was the best way to tie the different series together, including because it references the first season of Daredevil where Gao sells a drug made from crushed dragon's bone. The miniseries also references the events of The Avengers.

== Marketing ==
At the 2016 San Diego Comic-Con, a teaser trailer was shown featuring the word "Defend" forming from pieces of the logos from the four previous series over "the ominous shape of a giant hand", along with Glenn providing a voice over as Stick, asking how the four heroes plan to save New York when they cannot save themselves. For New York Comic Con later that year, the four Defenders' actors appeared together on stage, along with Weaver, to promote the miniseries.

In April 2017, the series' release date was revealed via a teaser trailer designed to look like security footage showing the four Defenders inside a Midland Circle elevator. The teaser also featured a hidden URL which led to a faux website for the New York Bulletin featuring "plenty of easter eggs and little details". Dave Lewis of the Los Angeles Times felt having the security footage teaser end on the timecode 08:18:20:17, was "a fun way to indicate the show's release date". A month later, Netflix and Marvel released a trailer for the miniseries. They also released multiple motion graphics showcasing various character crossovers through the social media accounts for The Defenders as well as each of the individual series. Nicole Sobon of Comic Book Resources felt releasing these this way was "a smart marketing move by both Marvel and Netflix, as over the course of the years, the Twitter accounts [for each series] have managed to drive in plenty of fan interaction by their 'conversations' between the characters". Cox, Ritter, Colter, Jones, and additional stars of the miniseries appeared at the 2017 San Diego Comic-Con to promote the series, where the first episode was also screened. A red carpet premiere for the series was held at the Tribeca Performing Arts Center on July 31, 2017, where the first two episodes were screened.

== Release ==
The Defenders was released on August 18, 2017, on the streaming service Netflix, worldwide, in Ultra HD 4K and high dynamic range. The eight, hour-long episodes were released simultaneously, as opposed to a serialized format, to encourage binge-watching, a format which has been successful for other Netflix series. Despite being branded as a "Netflix Original", The Defenders was licensed to Netflix from Disney.

The Defenders was removed from Netflix on March 1, 2022, along with the other Marvel Netflix series, due to Netflix's license for the series ending and Disney regaining the rights. Disney opted not to have Netflix pay a large licensing fee to retain the distribution rights for the series, and instead announced that all the series would be made available on Disney+ on March 16 in the United States, Canada, United Kingdom, Ireland, Australia, and New Zealand, and in Disney+'s other markets by the end of 2022. In the United States, revised parental controls were introduced to the service to allow the more mature content of the series to be added, similarly to the controls that already exist for other regions that have the Star content hub.

== Reception ==
=== Viewership ===
As Netflix does not reveal subscriber viewership numbers for any of their original series, the marketing analytics firm Jumpshot determined the series garnered 17% of the viewers that the second season of Daredevil received in its first 30 days, which was the most viewed season according to the firm. The Defenders was, comparably, the least-viewed of the Marvel Netflix series and had the largest week-over-week drop in viewership, declining by 67%, 48%, and 41%, respectively, over the 30-day period. Jumpshot, which "analyzes anonymized click-stream data from a panel of more than 100 million internet consumers", looked at the viewing behavior and activity of the company's U.S. members, factoring in the relative number of U.S. Netflix viewers who watched at least one episode of the season. The data excludes viewing that occurred on Netflix's connected TV or mobile apps. In October 2017, Netflix revealed The Defenders was the third-most "Binge Raced" Netflix original series globally, and first in South Korea. Netflix defined "Binge Racers" as viewers who watched the entire series within 24 hours after its release, and that data accommodated "for time zones and is reflective of a show's launch within 24 hours of a country's release." The company did note in their announcement that the "Binge Racing" ranking had "no relation to overall viewership." Nielsen Media Research, which tracks streaming viewership on U.S. television screens, reported that The Defenders garnered 2.8 million viewers on the day of its release. Nielsen Media Research later announced that the first episode of the miniseries averaged 6.1 million viewers during its premiere week in August.

According to Parrot Analytics, which looks at consumer engagement in consumer research, streaming, downloads, and on social media, The Defenders was the most in-demand digital original series and the fourth-most popular show overall from August 20 to 26, 2017, with demand increasing by 24% from the previous week. It also ranked in the top 0.1% of U.S. TV shows in terms of audience demand and engagement from November 7, 2017, to November 8, 2018, indicating strong and sustained audience demand. Despite its release in 2017, the series continued to attract significant interest. In July 2021, Parrot Analytics reported that the miniseries continued to generate significant global audience demand years after its release, with current interest levels 3.5 times the global average for TV shows.

=== Critical response ===
The review aggregator website Rotten Tomatoes reported a 78% approval rating with an average rating of 6.60/10 based on 100 reviews. The site's critical consensus reads, "Marvel's The Defenders further develops well-known characters in an action-packed arc whose payoff packs more than enough of a punch to offset its flaws." Metacritic, which uses a weighted average, assigned a score of 63 out of 100, based on 30 critics, indicating "generally favorable reviews".

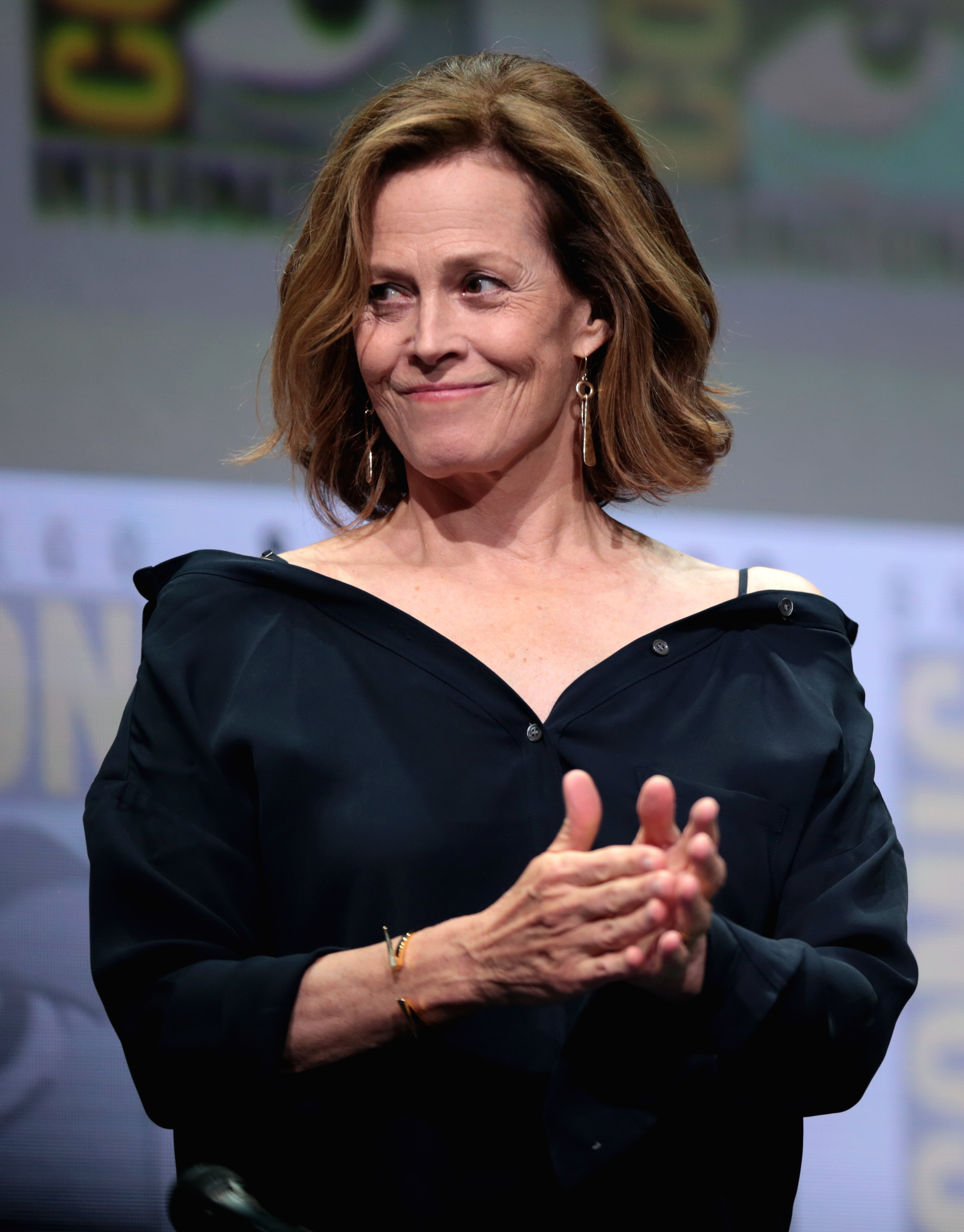
Sigourney Weaver was praised by critics for her role in The Defenders.

The early screening of the first episode at San Diego Comic-Con was met by "applause throughout" from the crowd. Tracy Brown of the Los Angeles Times noted after "a quick refresher on where each hero's solo story left off ... there is forward progress in the narratives for each" of the Defenders, despite them not interacting in the episode. She added that the episode included elements expected for a Marvel Netflix series, and concluded with a binge-watching-appropriate cliffhanger. Polygon's Julia Alexander was "stupidly excited to binge the rest of the season" after seeing the first episode, praising the "intriguing" Alexandra and her relationship with Elektra, as well as the miniseries' efforts to focus on the individual identities of the Defenders. Peter Sciretta for /Film called the episode "a fine start" to The Defenders, but felt it did not succeed in introducing the characters to viewers who had not seen the individual series. He highlighted the use of color throughout the episode to differentiate the characters.

Reviewing the first four episodes of the series, Katharine Trendacosta for io9 appreciated the writers for addressing the questions viewers wanted answered and depicting moments that fans wanted to see without "sacrificing the characters or the story". She did criticize the amount of exposition, the unoriginal story, and the "over-the-top" villains, but felt that "the good of The Defenders far outweighs the bad ... it's all a canvas to showcase Matt, Jessica, Luke, and Danny coming together [to be] more entertaining". The Washington Post's David Betancourt also gave a positive review, calling the event "well worth the wait", enjoying the pairing of Cage and Rand and calling Weaver's "compelling" Alexandra the "biggest surprise" of the series. Jeff Jensen for Entertainment Weekly gave the series a "B+", calling it "lively genre entertainment that recharges your interest in Marvel pop". He praised the fact that The Defenders was only 8 episodes long, compared to the 13 of previous Marvel Netflix seasons. Dan Jolin of Empire gave The Defenders 3 out of 5 stars, finding "enough joy" in the interactions between the Defenders to make it feel "worth the wait". However, he felt it failed to "up the ante story-wise", and was disappointed that Weaver's Alexandra was "yet another businessperson baddie whose dirty deeds are hidden by sharp suits".

Collider's Allison Keene also gave the miniseries 3 stars out of 5. She felt some of the solo series issues such as pacing and narrative choices were still present, but there were still elements to enjoy including Jessica Jones and the banter among the heroes. Keene felt that the pacing issues improve once the Defenders finally unite. She criticized the focus on Rand's company, and also said that the miniseries felt less like a culmination or ending than she would have liked. Reviewing the series for Uproxx, Alan Sepinwall felt The Defenders borrowed the best elements of the previous series, such as the fights scenes of Daredevil, Jessica Jones's "snappy dialogue, the music (particularly in Luke Cage's scenes), and Rosario Dawson. However, he felt that the pacing of the four episodes reviewed was "yet another Netflix ultra-slow burn". He saw this improve once the four heroes meet in the fourth episode, and hoped that in the second half of the season "both [the] show and team could justify their existence as something more than a package Marvel put together years ago in the hopes everything would work out". Variety's Maureen Ryan felt The Defenders had some positive elements and especially praised Weaver's performance, but described the series as "workmanlike" and said it was "a bit blander" than a series about superheroes and ninjas should have been.

USA Today's Kelly Lawler was more critical of the series, awarding it 2 out of 4 stars. Lawler felt Rand was the "undeniable handicap" of the series, having hoped that "The Defenders would shy away from Danny and his petulance, but unfortunately, Iron Fist is integral to the larger plot". She also felt the series had pacing issues, and said the Defenders as a group "lack chemistry". Lawler felt Weaver was "a bright spot" but concluded "viewers who were attracted to one or more of the Netflix series for their unique perspectives will be disappointed" by The Defenders. Reviewing the entire miniseries, Daniel Krupa of IGN gave it a 6.5 out of 10, saying, The Defenders felt "uneven, hastily-planned, and ultimately like a missed opportunity". Krupa pointed out the pacing issues and described the Hand as "an ill-defined, confused and confusing antagonist" that did not compare favorably to previous Marvel Netflix villains such as Wilson Fisk, Kilgrave, and Cornell "Cottonmouth" Stokes. Krupa did call the chemistry between the main characters "excellent", and praised Yung as providing "the most credible and emotionally-rich villain" in Elektra. The highlight of the miniseries for him was the Chinese restaurant scene in the fourth episode.

=== Accolades ===
Cox and Yung were named TVLine's "Performers of the Week" for the week ending August 26, 2017. The honor was specifically for their final scene of the miniseries, as they fight and argue while a building collapses around them. The site described the scene as an "emotionally compelling two-hander".

Year	Award	Category	Nominee(s)	Result	Ref.
2018	NAACP Image Awards	Outstanding Actor in a Drama Series	Mike Colter	Nominated	
2018	Saturn Awards	Best Supporting Actress on Television	Krysten Ritter	Nominated	
2018	Saturn Awards	Best New Media Superhero Series	Marvel's The Defenders	Nominated	
2018	Black Reel Awards	Outstanding Television Movie or Limited Series	Marvel's The Defenders	Nominated	
2018	Black Reel Awards	Outstanding Actor, TV Movie or Limited Series	Mike Colter	Nominated	
2018	Black Reel Awards	Outstanding Supporting Actress, TV Movie or Limited Series	Rosario Dawson	Nominated	
2018	Black Reel Awards	Outstanding Supporting Actress, TV Movie or Limited Series	Simone Missick	Nominated	
2018	Primetime Creative Arts Emmy Awards	Outstanding Original Main Title Theme Music	John Paesano	Nominated	

== Future ==
In January 2015, Netflix COO Ted Sarandos said that The Defenders was "eligible to go into multiple seasons for sure" and Netflix would look at "how well [they] are addressing both the Marvel fanbase but also the broader fanbase" in terms of determining if additional seasons would be appropriate. However, in July 2016, Loeb referred to the miniseries as a one-off event rather than a season of an ongoing story. Jones said the miniseries "feels like the end of Phase One" of the Marvel Netflix series, with the events of the miniseries leading into "the beginning of another phase", while Ritter said she would be happy to return for more after enjoying the experience making these episodes, despite it planned as a one-time event. In mid-2018, Loeb and Netflix vice president of original content Cindy Holland both said that there were "no plans" to continue the series.

In September 2018, Netflix renamed the Facebook page for the series to "NX", Netflix's "new geek-friendly division of genre content". Netflix did not alter the series' Twitter account in a similar manner. The change left fans upset at the apparent "bait-and-switch", with many suggesting they would have followed a separate page for NX had it been created in that manner. Kofi Outlaw of ComicBook.com felt this change was "a pretty big indicator that Netflix is done with The Defenders as one of its original series". In response to this, Loeb reiterated that there were still no plans for the series to continue at that time, but this did not mean that it would never be continued in the future, especially since a "Defenders" team was not actually formed in this miniseries and future Defenders stories could then focus on different characters.

Ahead of Cox's appearance as Daredevil in Echo, which released in January 2024, Marvel Studios' head of streaming Brad Winderbaum acknowledged that Marvel Studios had previously been "a little bit cagey" about what was part of their Sacred Timeline, noting how there had been the corporate divide between what Marvel Studios created and what Marvel Television created. He continued that as time has passed, Marvel Studios has begun to see "how well integrated the [Marvel Television] stories are" and personally felt "confident" in saying Daredevil specifically was part of the Sacred Timeline. With Echo's release, all of the Netflix series were retroactively added to the MCU Disney+ timeline, with The Defenders placed between the films Ant-Man (2015) and Captain America: Civil War (2016).
