= Amy Rutberg =

American actress (born 1981)

- Born: Amy Lauren Ruth Rutberg; November 11, 1981 (age 44); Los Angeles, California, United States
- Education: University of California, Los Angeles
- Occupation: Actress
- Years active: 1997–present
- Height: 166 cm (5 ft 5 in)
- Spouse: Shane Rahmani (m. 2011)
- Children: 1

Amy Lauren Ruth Rutberg (born November 11, 1981) is an American actress. She is known for her role as Marci Stahl in the Marvel Cinematic Universe series Daredevil (2015-2018) and The Defenders (2017).

== Early life ==
Born in Los Angeles, Rutberg became interested in acting at a young age after watching a production of Peter Pan and she was "carried away screaming...because she was certain Peter would be back to fly her to Neverland". She transferred to University of California, Los Angeles where she continued to study other subjects like law. Just before turning seventeen, she acquired an agent and began to pursue acting.

== Career ==
Rutberg starred in the a cappella musical comedy Perfect Harmony at the Clurman Theatre in New York City. She made guest appearances in the shows Blindspot, NCIS: New Orleans, The Blacklist, Elementary and Taken.

In 2015, Rutberg made her debut in Daredevil as Marci Stahl, girlfriend to Foggy Nelson. Although the character of Marci was originally cast to appear only in one episode, she would go on to be a recurring character through the entire series, with a guest appearance in The Defenders.

In 2018, Rutberg joined the cast of the ABC television reboot of the Blaxploitation series Get Christie Love!. However, ABC later announced that it had decided not to pick the pilot up to series.

== Personal life ==
Amy Rutberg is married and has one child. She appeared on season 6 episode 11 of the reality series, Say Yes to the Dress.

== Filmography ==
Television roles
Year	Title	Role	Notes
1997	Sports Theater with Shaquille O'Neal		Episode: "Broken Record"
1997	Pacific Blue	Amy Jorgenson	Episode: "Ties That Bind"
2005	Everwood	Sarah	Episode: "A Mountain Town"
2006	As the World Turns	Nurse	1 episode
2008	Recount	Clark Center Instigator	TV movie
2008	Law & Order	Courtney	Episode: "Misbegotten"
2009	Jake and Amir	Amanda	Web series, 3 episodes
2009	The Unusuals	Roxanne Tate	Episode: "One Man Band"
2009	Law & Order: Criminal Intent	Emma Cohen	Episode: "Passion"
2010	Law & Order	Megan Kerik	Episode: "Blackmail"
2013	Murder in Manhattan	Mary Barket	TV Pilot
2014	The Actress	Kate	Episode: "Kate"
2014	Alpha House	Melanie Saks	Episode: "The Retreat"
2015	The Good Wife	Rebecca Smercornish	Episode: "Open Source"
2015	Karl Manhair, Postal Inspector	Amy / Delores Laramie	Web series, Recurring
2015–2018	Daredevil	Marci Stahl	Recurring (seasons 1, 3); Guest (season 2); 11 episodes
2016	Elementary	Nicole Slater	Episode: "Down Where the Dead Delight"
2017	Beerfest	Angie	TV miniseries, main cast
2017	Bull	Abigail Walsh	Episode: "The Fall"
2017	The Blacklist	Annie Kaplan	Episode: "Requiem"
2017	Marvel's The Defenders	Marci Stahl	Episode: "Mean Right Hook"
2017	Blindspot	Marci Booth	Episode: "Enemy Bag of Tricks"
2018–2019	NCIS: New Orleans	Megan Sutter/The Angel	Recurring role
2018	Pinkalicious & Peterrific	Dr. Wink (voice)	Episode: "Fairy House/Pinkabotta & Peterbotta"
2018	Taken	Anna Warren	Episode: "Charm School"
2018	Get Christie Love!	Danielle "Silver Manicure" Moran	TV Pilot
2019	Law & Order: Special Victims Unit	Annabeth Pearl	Episode: Part 33
2019	FBI	Stacy Harper	Episode: "The Lives of Others"
2021	Dopesick	Alice Fisher	Episode: "Black Box Warning"

Film roles
Year	Title	Role	Notes
2009	Sucker Punch	Pauline	Short film
2010	Inside Out	Brook Price	Short film
2013	Refuge	Nell	Also known as The Mansion
2014	The Opposite Sex	Regina	Uncredited
2016	Hard Sell	Vet Susan	
2017	Rebel in the Rye	Betsy Hopkins	
2018	Accommodations	Claudia	

Video game roles
Year	Title	Role
2011	Saints Row: The Third	Radio Voices
