= Daredevil season 2 =

Daredevil
- Season 2
- Promotional poster
- Showrunners: Douglas Petrie; Marco Ramirez
- Starring: Charlie Cox; Deborah Ann Woll; Elden Henson; Jon Bernthal; Élodie Yung; Stephen Rider; Rosario Dawson; Vincent D'Onofrio
- No. of episodes: 13

Release
- Original network: Netflix
- Original release: March 18, 2016

Season chronology
- ← Previous; Season 1 Next → Season 3

The second season of the American streaming television series Daredevil, which is based on the Marvel Comics character of the same name, follows Matt Murdock / Daredevil, a blind lawyer-by-day who fights crime at night, crossing paths with the deadly Frank Castle / Punisher along with the return of an old girlfriend—Elektra Natchios. It is set in the Marvel Cinematic Universe (MCU), sharing continuity with the films and other television series of the franchise. The season is produced by Marvel Television in association with ABC Studios, with Douglas Petrie and Marco Ramirez serving as showrunners, and series creator Drew Goddard acting as consultant.

Charlie Cox stars as Murdock, while Jon Bernthal and Élodie Yung are introduced as Castle and Natchios, respectively. Deborah Ann Woll, Elden Henson, Rosario Dawson, and Vincent D'Onofrio also return from the first season, with Stephen Rider joining them. The season was ordered in April 2015 after the successful release of the first, with Petrie and Ramirez replacing the season one showrunner Steven S. DeKnight. Production on the season began in July 2015 and continued through December, with the season focusing on the nature of heroism through comparison of Murdock to Castle and Natchios, and showing how the latter two affect Murdock's life.

The first two episodes of the season premiered in Paris on March 7, 2016, with the full season of 13 episodes released on Netflix on March 18. Critics praised the introduction of Castle and Natchios, as well as Bernthal's performance in particular, the season's action scenes, and storylines. However, many missed the presence of Vondie Curtis-Hall's Ben Urich from the first season, and D'Onofrio's Wilson Fisk during the first half of the second season. The series was renewed for a third season in July 2016.

== Episodes ==
No. overall	No. in season	Title	Directed by	Written by	Original release date
14	1	"Bang"	Phil Abraham	Douglas Petrie & Marco Ramirez	March 18, 2016
Following the downfall of Wilson Fisk and the Russian mafia, and the disappearance of the Chinese and Yakuza, various gangs attempt to take control of Hell's Kitchen, including the Irish Mob and Cartels. When a group of Irish are gunned down by an apparent "army", the sole survivor, Elliot "Grotto" Grote, seeks out the firm of Nelson and Murdock for protection. Karen Page, Nelson and Murdock's assistant—who is struggling to manage their financial troubles given that the firm's clientele often cannot afford legal fees—takes the wounded Grotto to the hospital, while Franklin "Foggy" Nelson learns from the Dogs of Hell biker gang that a group of their own was murdered by the same "army" as the Irish. Matt Murdock, as his secret vigilante persona Daredevil, investigates the cartels, who he learns had all of their high-power weapons stolen by a single man. At the hospital, Grotto and Page are attacked by this man and barely escape alive. Daredevil confronts the new vigilante in the rooftops near the hospital, and is shot in the head at point blank range.
15	2	"Dogs to a Gunfight"	Phil Abraham	Marco Ramirez & Douglas Petrie	March 18, 2016
Nelson finds Murdock the next morning. Though his body armor saved his life, Murdock's head and heightened senses are damaged and impaired, and Nelson insists that he rest and recover. Nelson attempts to get Grotto into witness protection, but since all of his mob contacts were murdered, District Attorney (DA) Samantha Reyes only agrees if Grotto wears a wire to a meeting with a high-level drug lord. After his senses improve, Murdock asks his armorer, Melvin Potter, for a new, improved mask, before investigating the hideout where the Irish were murdered. Realizing that they had a now missing dog, Murdock tracks it to a nearby apartment, where the other vigilante—nicknamed "The Punisher" by the DA's office—had been listening to the DA's operation with Grotto on a police radio. When the Punisher attacks the operation, Nelson and Page realize that Reyes had always meant it as a trap. Police snipers fire at the Punisher as Daredevil arrives and attacks him. Grotto escapes in the chaos, while Murdock is injured and loses consciousness.
16	3	"New York's Finest"	Marc Jobst	Mark Verheiden	March 18, 2016
Daredevil wakes up as the Punisher's captive, and pleads with him to stop killing, feeling that there is goodness within anyone, and that no criminal is beyond redemption. The Punisher insists that what he does is necessary, that by murdering criminals he stops them from doing wrong ever again, while Daredevil merely delays the inevitable by injuring them. Their debate culminates in Punisher bringing out Grotto, whom he caught stealing a car in an attempt to flee the city, and strapping a gun with a single bullet to Daredevil's hand, offering him the choice of killing Grotto, killing the Punisher before he kills Grotto, or doing nothing and living with the fact that his actions caused someone's death anyway. Daredevil shoots the chains holding him and breaks free, but in doing so gives the Punisher time to fatally shoot Grotto. As the dying Grotto asks why Daredevil allowed him to die, the Punisher attacks a nearby Dogs of Hell group. Daredevil knocks the Punisher unconscious, and then fights his way through the angry gang members to safety.
17	4	"Penny and Dime"	Peter Hoar	John C. Kelley	March 18, 2016
Finn Cooley, a high-profile member of the Irish Mob whose son was killed by the Punisher, arrives in New York seeking revenge, and tracks the dog Punisher took to his apartment, where he realizes who the Punisher is. Page learns that the Punisher is a former United States Marine named Frank Castle, whose family was murdered during a shootout between the Irish and the Dogs of Hell, leaving him the sole survivor. Barely surviving, Castle was angered over an apparent cover up of the shooting, potentially orchestrated by Reyes. The Irish confront Castle at the scene of his family's murder and take him hostage. Cooley violently tortures him, until Castle escapes and brutally kills Cooley and several other Irish gangsters. Daredevil finds them and stops Castle from murdering anyone else, helping him escape. Castle tells Daredevil about his family, before allowing himself to be arrested, with Daredevil giving credit for his capture to Sergeant Brett Mahoney in hopes of restoring the public's faith in the police rather than in vigilante justice. Later, Murdock and Page walk home and share a tender moment. Murdock arrives at his apartment where he finds Elektra Natchios waiting for him.
18	5	"Kinbaku"	Floria Sigismondi	Lauren Schmidt Hissrich	March 18, 2016
Ten years ago, Murdock met Natchios, the bored daughter of a wealthy Greek ambassador. The two bonded over their shared thrill-seeking nature and skills, with Murdock eventually revealing his abilities and the nature of his father's death at the hands of Roscoe Sweeney. When Natchios manipulated Murdock into confronting Sweeney, hoping to have Murdock kill him, Murdock refused to do so, and Natchios left. In the present day, Natchios asks for Murdock's help with the Japanese arm of the Roxxon Corporation, with whom her late father had dealings. Murdock refuses, but spies on her business meeting with the company, where she plants a bug in their system. Murdock later confronts Natchios about Sweeney, and she claims that she knows Murdock's true nature, which she believes is the same as hers. To prove it, she has manipulated him once again, revealing that she has his Daredevil costume for him as what appears to be remnants of the Yakuza track the bug to her apartment.
19	6	"Regrets Only"	Andy Goddard	Sneha Koorse	March 18, 2016
Murdock and Natchios defeat the Yakuza assailants. Natchios believes that the Yakuza are up to something big in New York. Murdock reluctantly agrees to continue helping her when she agrees to his conditions that she not kill anyone, that she'll respect his romantic interest in Page, and that she leave the city once they are done. Murdock, Nelson, and Page are visited by the public defender on the Punisher case, who reveals that Reyes intends to link Castle to other Dogs of Hell murders outside of New York, making the death penalty an option. Murdock and Page convince Nelson that they should be helping Castle themselves, to protect him from Reyes and learn what really happened to him and his family. While Murdock and Natchios attend a Roxxon gala and steal a valuable Yakuza ledger, Page reveals to Castle what she has learned of his past, eventually earning his cooperation. However, in front of Reyes and the judge, Castle refuses a plea deal that would give him life in prison and instead pleads not guilty. An angered Reyes has the trial fast tracked, with The People v. Frank Castle set to begin within a week.
20	7	"Semper Fidelis"	Ken Girotti	Luke Kalteux	March 18, 2016
Because of his dealings with Natchios, Murdock is late for Castle's trial, and Nelson steps in for the opening statement. Unable to use a PTSD defense from Castle's time at war—Castle believes it would be disrespectful to real PTSD-suffering war veterans—Nelson instead focuses on Castle's family being failed by the justice system. Murdock works with Page in preparing to cross-examine the chief medical examiner, who likely doctored the Castle family death certificates for Reyes, but before he can do so in court the man confesses; he had been tortured the night before into revealing the truth. Murdock realizes that Natchios had overheard him and Page and attempted to "help", and reveals his involvement with her to Nelson. With the examiner's testimony now invalid, Nelson's relationship with Murdock fractures. Murdock confronts Natchios, who agrees to stay away from the trial, before joining her in searching an abandoned building site from which the Yakuza ledger revealed shipments of dirt. Inside they find a giant hole.
21	8	"Guilty as Sin"	Michael Uppendahl	Whit Anderson	March 18, 2016
Murdock and Natchios are attacked by ninjas, and have to be saved by Murdock's old mentor Stick. They escape back to Murdock's apartment, where Stick reveals to Murdock that Natchios works for him (and has done since before she first met Murdock, which was on a mission to recruit him for Stick) as he fights a war for the Chaste against the ancient group The Hand, for which the Japanese Roxxon arm and the Yakuza are fronts. Murdock offers to take Natchios back and help her defeat the Hand if she renounces Stick and his murderous ways; she agrees. In court, Nelson begins to sway the jury in Castle's favor, but Castle takes the stand and purposefully wrecks his own defense. Page, who had earlier discovered Murdock with Natchios and Stick in his apartment, and Nelson blame Murdock for losing the trial. Natchios and Murdock share a close moment before they are attacked by a lone ninja. Murdock subdues him and discovers that he is only a teenager, before Natchios slits his throat, to Murdock's horror. Castle enters prison, and is led by a guard to a meeting with Fisk.
22	9	"Seven Minutes in Heaven"	Stephen Surjik	Marco Ramirez & Lauren Schmidt Hissrich	March 18, 2016
Fisk offers Castle a chance at Dutton, the "kingpin" of Ryker's Island prison who Fisk believes organised the deal-gone-wrong which led to the deaths of Castle's family. Fisk admits that this will allow him to take control of the prison himself. Castle mortally wounds Dutton, who reveals that he organised the deal for a drug dealer called "the Blacksmith". Fisk then betrays Castle by releasing Dutton's supporters on him, but Castle slaughters them all. Realizing that Castle could be an asset against Fisk's competitors while the latter is imprisoned, Fisk arranges for Castle to escape the prison. However, Castle warns Fisk that the next time he sees him, he will kill him. Nelson and Murdock agree to part ways, while Page continues her personal investigation of Castle. She confirms with the now former-chief medical examiner that in addition to the Castle family there was another victim of the massacre, an undercover cop; the deal and subsequent massacre were part of a sting operation. Murdock investigates a Hand facility called the Farm, where he is confronted by Nobu Yoshioka, whom he had previously killed.
23	10	"The Man in the Box"	Peter Hoar	Story by : John C. Kelley; Teleplay by : Whit Anderson & Sneha Koorse	March 18, 2016
Daredevil asks Mahoney to send the several children being used as apparent human incubators for a mix of chemicals at the Farm to nurse Claire Temple to receive hospital treatment. Learning of Castle's escape, Reyes has Nelson, Murdock, and Page meet at her office. She confirms that her office had organised the sting on the Blacksmith's deal with the Irish, Cartel, and Dogs of Hell, and explains that she chose not to clear the area so as not to tip off the criminals, leading to the deaths of the undercover cop and Castle's family when the deal went south. Now, she believes that Castle is targeting her daughter, and pleads for help in bringing him in. However, Reyes is gunned down in front of them by an unidentified shooter, and Foggy is wounded. Murdock visits Fisk in prison and confirms his suspicions, that Fisk is running it and orchestrated Castle's release. Natchios kills an assassin sent by Stick, and Castle saves Page from a similar attack to the one on Reyes. At the hospital, the children awake as Daredevil prepares to defend the building from the Hand.
24	11	".380"	Stephen Surjik	Mark Verheiden	March 18, 2016
Daredevil saves Temple from the Hand, but the children willingly leave with the ninjas and drain themselves of their blood to feed the chemicals into an ancient device. Some of the Hand died during the fight, and an attempted autopsy on one of them shows the scars of a prior autopsy. The hospital board chooses to cover this up, compelling Temple to quit. Page and Castle are confronted by the Blacksmith's men, and Castle violently beats his location out of them before murdering them. He then leaves the horrified Page. Daredevil confronts Tower, who reveals the one lead the DA's office has on the Blacksmith: a competitor working out of Chinatown. Daredevil goes there to find Madame Gao, an old ally of Fisk's, who sends him to the pier. Castle attacks a boat there, used to smuggle drugs, and attempts to kill a man claiming to be the Blacksmith; Daredevil stops him, but the Blacksmith's men arrive and attack the boat. Learning that Natchios survived the hit, Stick prepares to fight her himself.
25	12	"The Dark at the End of the Tunnel"	Euros Lyn	Lauren Schmidt Hissrich & Douglas Petrie	March 18, 2016
Stick regrets never being able to "tame" Natchios, who always had an affinity for murder, and is trying to rectify that mistake. It was also shown that he killed his colleague Star to protect Elektra. Daredevil stops the two from killing each other, but the Hand arrive and kidnap Stick. The police believe that Castle is dead, and Page reluctantly agrees; rather than dropping her investigation into Castle, which she was going to write an exposé on for the New York Bulletin, Page decides to write a profile to show the public that there was more to Castle than just the Punisher. She interviews Castle's Marine commander Ray Schoonover, but realizes that he is the Blacksmith. Castle arrives and murders Schoonover despite Page's pleas. Daredevil and Natchios find Stick, with Natchios still bent on killing him. However, they are confronted by Yoshioka, who reveals that Natchios' killer instincts are because she is the Black Sky, a mythical weapon worshiped by the Hand. Natchios considers accepting the Hand's fealty, but Daredevil convinces her to choose her own destiny, and she instead helps Stick escape.
26	13	"A Cold Day in Hell's Kitchen"	Peter Hoar	Douglas Petrie & Marco Ramirez	March 18, 2016
Nelson joins the law firm of Jeri Hogarth. With Stick safe at Murdock's apartment, the Hand raids a police station for information on people Daredevil has helped. They take hostages including Page and criminal Turk Barrett. Because Barrett is on house arrest, police officers tracking him report the situation before they are killed by the Hand. Murdock and Natchios use this call to find the hostages and free them before they can cut off Turk's foot to remove his ankle monitor. They are then confronted by a horde of Hand ninjas, led by Yoshioka. Natchios sacrifices herself to save Murdock, and he defeats the rest of the Hand with the help of Castle. Stick returns to finish off Yoshioka, beheading him. Murdock and Stick mourn Natchios, with Murdock stating that his love for her was worth it, and accepting that Stick's philosophy of cutting off emotional ties is flawed. Castle sets his home on fire, who looks to move on from his past and accept the Punisher mantle. Murdock arranges a meeting with Page, and reveals to her that he is Daredevil. The Hand later exhume Natchios' body, and place her in the ancient device.

== Cast and characters ==
=== Main ===
- Charlie Cox as Matt Murdock / Daredevil
- Deborah Ann Woll as Karen Page
- Elden Henson as Franklin "Foggy" Nelson
- Jon Bernthal as Frank Castle / Punisher
- Élodie Yung as Elektra Natchios
- Stephen Rider as Blake Tower
- Rosario Dawson as Claire Temple
- Vincent D'Onofrio as Wilson Fisk / Kingpin

=== Recurring ===
- Royce Johnson as Brett Mahoney
- Susan Varon as Josie
- Michelle Hurd as Samantha Reyes
- Marilyn Torres as Louisa Delgado
- Geoffrey Cantor as Mitchell Ellison
- Ron Nakahara as Hirochi
- John Pirkis as Stan Gibson
- Scott Glenn as Stick
- Peter Shinkoda as Nobu Yoshioka

=== Notable guests ===
- Rob Morgan as Turk Barrett
- Matt Gerald as Melvin Potter
- Peter McRobbie as Paul Lantom
- Amy Rutberg as Marci Stahl
- Kevin Nagle as Roscoe Sweeney
- Wai Ching Ho as Gao
- Suzanne H. Smart as Shirley Benson
- Carrie-Anne Moss as Jeri Hogarth

== Production ==
=== Development ===
When asked about the future of the series following the first season, showrunner Steven S. DeKnight said that Daredevil "is one part of the bigger plan—Jessica Jones, Luke Cage, Iron Fist, and then The Defenders. How that all fits together, and whether or not there will be a second season of this show—or if it will fold into the others—are questions nobody really has answers to yet." In November 2014, DeKnight said that there "probably will be more" seasons of Daredevil following the first. In January 2015, Netflix COO Ted Sarandos stated the series was "eligible to go into multiple seasons for sure" and Netflix would look at "how well [they] are addressing both the Marvel fanbase but also the broader fanbase" to determine if additional seasons would be appropriate.

On April 21, 2015, Marvel and Netflix announced that the series had been renewed for a second season, with Douglas Petrie and Marco Ramirez replacing DeKnight as showrunners as well as acting as executive producers; both served as writers in the first season and worked closely with DeKnight and series creator Drew Goddard. The season introduces the Frank Castle / Punisher, whom DeKnight and the writers had wanted to introduce in a post-credits scene during the first-season finale but were unable due to the way that Netflix begins the next episode during the credits of the current one. DeKnight felt that this "was the right decision. I think there's a better, more organic way to introduce him to the world." Ramirez referred to the second season internally as "Daredevil vs. the Punisher". In September 2015, Goddard explained that he was still involved with the season as an executive producer, consulting with Petrie and Ramirez when asked to. The season consists of 13 hour-long episodes.

=== Writing ===
What's fantastic about the story is, is that it's created this enormous division in his life, because the woman that he once loved has returned, and she certainly has some issues with morality, and how you get the job done, and going on the other end of the spectrum is Frank Castle, who believes that justice needs to be served in a particular way. For Matt, who believes in the law, the question of whether or not he is a vigilante, and whether or not that makes him the same as these people, is something that will drive the story, and will drive Matt.

— Jeph Loeb on how the season explores "what it is to be a hero".

Ramirez talked about how the second season would be different from the first, saying that the writers had spent the first season wondering "if there was a place for dark and gritty content in superheroes" and because of the positive fan reaction to that ("we got a loud answer of 'yes'"), approached the second season with the mindset, "you wanted grounded and wanted dark, here's Elektra and Punisher. You asked for it." Petrie, talking about the potential use of flashbacks in the season, said that sometimes it is best to "peel back the layer of the onion through flashback, or two people in a room talking can have all the power in the world. That's something we get to pick and choose."

On including the Punisher specifically in the season, where he is introduced to the Marvel Cinematic Universe (MCU), Goddard felt television was the best fit for the character, as the writers are "able to do things on the small screen that fit that character better than if we had to water him down for the movies." Goddard stated that the season's approach to the characters and their actions would be to do what makes sense for the characters rather than "pushing the boundary" or looking to shock the audience, though he noted that this could still go in a more "adult...darker, dirtier" way due to the freedom of Netflix and the presence of characters such as the Punisher. Petrie stated that the writers hoped to "stir the pot" and "get people to think" with the inclusion of the Punisher and his lethal methods, adding, "Taking lethal justice into your own hands in America in 2015 is tricky shit. We have not shied away from the rich complicated reality of Now. If you've got a gun and you're not the police you're going to incite strong feelings." Ramirez added that Castle was not referred to as "Punisher" in the writers' room, similarly to Wilson Fisk not being called "Kingpin" for season one, as it allowed the writers to think "about [Castle] as a man with a vendetta, who made an oath to his dead family. The more specific it got, the less it became about issues outside of Hell's Kitchen or other things." In the series, the moniker of "The Punisher" is given to Castle by the media due to his aggressive actions.

For the timing of introducing the new characters, the showrunners decided to introduce the Punisher immediately and hold back on Elektra briefly, with Ramirez explaining that "one of the pitfalls when we have this many great characters to play with is wanting to throw them at the wall", but it was important to take the time to introduce the new characters properly to the audience, particularly to the people who weren't already familiar with them. Elaborating on the aim to keep the story focused on Murdock, Petrie revealed that the writers would often come up with "amazing stuff" for the season, but then realize that they had forgotten about Murdock and had to "completely turn it over and look at how this affects Matt and filter it through that prism." Ramirez added,

It could easily become The Punisher story or the Elektra story that Matt cameos in, and not vice versa. So, we built it like a Matt story, in terms of what we wanted to put him through, where we wanted to get him, by the end of the season, and what we wanted to have him learn about himself, and we used an Elektra and Frank story throughout, to get him there [...] we talked about when we watch shows in 13 episode stretches, how do we watch them? What is an exciting structure that we would like to think about here? Do we divide it right down the middle? Do we do a three-act structure? [...] If you were to sit and watch 13 episodes, you would absolutely feel a structure, much like in the comics. That's what we did this season.

Charlie Cox explained that with Wilson Fisk imprisoned following the first season, season two picks up with "the crime rate [having] plummeted. Things have returned to normal, if not better than normal", which is when Punisher is introduced, who makes Matt Murdock "question everything. Matt has to reevaluate who is [sic] and what he does". Jeph Loeb, head of Marvel Television, said that "if season one was really about Matt's decision to become a hero, then season two really became about what is it to be a hero." By introducing the Punisher and Elektra, the writers were able to "push and pull" on Murdock, contrasting their three ideologies—the Punisher seeing "justice in a very black-and-white kind of way", and Elektra living "more in the gray". On Elektra in particular, Loeb said that she has a very clear, self-motivated agenda, and she challenges Murdock's own agenda and "quest for justice. Who are you doing this for? Why are you doing this? What's the end goal that you're trying to achieve?" More backstory and story arcs had been created for the characters Nobu and Gao, but this was not used, which Nobu actor Peter Shinkoda attributed to Loeb not caring about Asian people.

=== Casting ===
Charlie Cox, Deborah Ann Woll, Elden Henson, Rosario Dawson, and Vincent D'Onofrio return from the first season as Matt Murdock / Daredevil, Karen Page, Franklin "Foggy" Nelson, Claire Temple, and Wilson Fisk / Kingpin, respectively. In June 2015, Jon Bernthal was cast as Frank Castle / Punisher, and Élodie Yung was cast as Elektra Natchios a month later. In September, Stephen Rider joined the cast as Blake Tower.

Also returning from season one are Royce Johnson as Brett Mahoney, Susan Varon as Josie, Geoffrey Cantor as Mitchell Ellison, Scott Glenn as Stick, Peter Shinkoda as Nobu Yoshioka, Rob Morgan as Turk Barrett, Matt Gerald as Melvin Potter, Peter McRobbie as Father Paul Lantom, Amy Rutberg as Marci Stahl, Kevin Nagle as Roscoe Sweeney, Wai Ching Ho as Gao, and Suzanne H. Smart as Shirley Benson. Ron Nakahara, John Pirkis, and Marilyn Torres have recurring roles as Hirochi, Stan Gibson, and Louisa Delgado, respectively, while Michelle Hurd and Carrie-Anne Moss reprise their Jessica Jones roles of Samantha Reyes and Jeri Hogarth.

=== Design ===
Joshua Shaw designed costumes for characters in the season. Petrie stated that more layers were added to the series' atmosphere to keep the season dark but provide more clarity to the viewer, an issue that occurred in the first season. Petrie also talked about the costumes for characters such as Elektra, noting that they had to not only look at the comics and "what looks cool", but also "what would you really fight in? What would protect you? [...] will people be wearing kick ass costumes in this show? At some point, everybody does. We promise. But, that said, we want to make them feel as organic and grounded as possible.

Lorraine Calvert joined the series as costume designer for the season. On adapting Elektra's costume for the season, which in the comics usually consists of impractically "strappy" red cloth, Calvert decided to make it utilitarian and appealing, while still being faithful to the comics. Originally starting out opposite of the eventual sleek design for both her fighting and daytime attire, Calvert said, "Ideas were tossed around about how she was possibly bohemian, [because] she was a free spirit who traveled all over the world with as much money as she possibly could." This eventually led to the final, sleeker design, because Elektra "really needs a very simple, elegant line because too much cloth is overwhelming." The costume consisted of "black moto pants, a one-piece zippered body suit, a sleeveless vest, and red cloth to provide the highlights and the hood covering Elektra's face." The shade of the red used for Elektra throughout the season was chosen so it would not clash with the red in Daredevil's costume, as well as to match the darker tone of the series.

Daredevil's costume was also upgraded in the season, with Calvert calling it "a much more fluid suit and much more tactical in a way." The costume department "streamlined" the suit to make it simpler, using less material on the gauntlets and boots. Cox described it as a "delicate area" that required some "tweaks" after the brief use of it at the end of the first season. He noted that the changes are weaved into the storyline of the season, including the need for a new, redesigned mask, and a lower-half of the suit that is closer to the original cargo pants that the character wore earlier in the previous season. These baggier pants gave Cox and his stunt double much more maneuverability.

=== Filming ===
Production on the season began in July 2015 in East Harlem, with the working title Ringside, and a nine-day-per-episode schedule. Filming locations included the Metro Theater; Roosevelt Island; Greenpoint, Brooklyn; Long Island City; SoHo for exterior shots of Murdock's apartment; Newtown Creek; the Forest Park Carousel; Bayside, Queens for Castle's old home; Green-Wood Cemetery and Catacombs; East Village; the Bronx County Courthouse; Tribeca; Hell's Kitchen; the Brooklyn Navy Yard; Fort Totten and tunnels inside Bayley Seton Hospital for when Murdock confronts the Hand; and Calvary Cemetery. Filming ended in December 2015.

Martin Ahlgren joined the series as director of photography for the season, deciding to "go in a slightly different direction" than the first season, but retaining "the yellowish street light color that gave season one a very distinct style". Ahlgren filmed season two in 4K resolution on RED Dragon cameras, and tried to use in-shot lighting such as lamps and car headlights, as well as "4×4 Light Blankets—flexible sheets of LED that was small enough to fit into tight locations and light enough that it could be taped to a wall, yet outputs a very nice soft light that can be adjusted from daylight to tungsten color". Ahlgren highlighted the car chase at the beginning of "Guilty as Sin" as a challenge, noting the many ninjas chasing the car, and the one that "jumps up on the car and travels on the roof for a block", with all the stunts filmed on location. An Ultimate Arm, "a motorized crane mounted on a Porsche Cayenne", was used for the sequence, a break from the series' usual handheld and steadicam operations. The chase was shot over two nights in Greenpoint, Brooklyn, with the interior of the car then filmed on a green screen stage, a rarity for the series, "to give the actors a better environment to act in".

On the season's fight sequences and choreography, Bernthal said, "The fights are all character-driven and the fights tell a story". Cox added that "there is absolutely an attempt to make sure every punch or kick that is thrown is like a line of dialogue; there is motive behind it, there is reason behind it, it means something". Cox's stunt double, Chris Brewster, explained how the series' fight choreography has evolved, with the first season having shown Murdock just starting out as a vigilante—"he fought with all heart and soul, but wasn't a polished fighter. He was more raw and gritty"—while the second season sees the character having learned from previous mistakes—"his style is more defined and thought out now, but he will always fight with the Daredevil flair". As for the fighting styles of Punisher and Elektra, Brewster said that because of the Punisher's military background he uses a lot of weapons, and his "hand to hand style is more of a close quarter combat nature", while Elektra was trained by Stick and the Hand, so she has similar movement to Daredevil who was also trained by Stick. "However", Brewster continued, "The Hand are trained assassins who are all about stealth takeouts and quick kills. Her style shows elements of" that as well. The season uses multiple different martial art styles, including kali, Chinese kung fu, wing chun, kenjutsu, and boxing.

The one-take fight in "New York's Finest" in which Daredevil fights gang members down a staircase was described by Cox as "kind of like an homage" to the first season's well received one-take hallway fight scene, and "almost like that scene on crack". Silvera noted that it is a metaphorical "descent into Hell" rather than a "test of will" like the first season's scene. The stunt team had three days to prepare the fight, and the final sequence was filmed in a day and a half. Unlike the first season's scene, which was shot on a set and used a camera mounted on a ceiling track, the stairwell sequence was filmed on location, and required the camera to be passed around multiple people to get the final shot. The season includes another homage to the hallway scene in "Seven Minutes in Heaven", where the Punisher has his own hallway fight. Silvera noted that this "full-blown", murdering Punisher was "a strong contrast to Daredevil". For all the season's fights, the stunt team filmed a previsualization version using stunt doubles, with the actors, such as Cox, then shown this in sections on the day of filming, and allowed to make adjustments where necessary. Though the actors completed the majority of the fights, doubles were used for flips and major stunts.

=== Visual effects ===
Shade VFX returns from the first season to work on the visual effects for the series.

=== Music ===
By September 2015, John Paesano had begun composing music for the season. He felt that the season's new showrunners "were true to what we were trying to do in season one. There were just elements in season two that we had to acknowledge" such as the Punisher and Elektra. He jokingly said that "it's not like we all of the sudden went into John Williams territory, you know? It's definitely still dark, still gritty [...] but it definitely jumps up a couple levels." When approaching the characters of Punisher and Elektra, with whom Paesano was familiar from the comics and previous adaptations, he "took all those preconceived notions I had with a grain of salt" and waited to see what the season's interpretation of the characters would be. Paesano worked closely with the series' sound design team, spotting episodes with them to coordinate where "we were going to hit what" and "maintain that definable aspect of New York" and its sound. A soundtrack album for the season was released digitally by Hollywood Records on July 15, 2016.

All music composed by John Paesano, unless otherwise noted.

Daredevil: Season 2 (Original Soundtrack Album)
No.	Title	Music	Length
1.	"Main Title"	Braden Kimball and John Paesano	1:03
2.	"Devil of Hell's Kitchen"		2:47
3.	"The Punisher"		4:19
4.	"Stairway to Hell"		3:25
5.	"Raindrops"		3:03
6.	"Sparring"		2:51
7.	"Playing House"		1:41
8.	"Dripping Chilis"		3:47
9.	"Ninjas!"		3:47
10.	"Cell Block D"		4:19
11.	"Black Sky"		3:42
12.	"The Diner"		5:41
13.	"Stick and Ellie"		2:26
14.	"They Have Nothing Now"		6:12
15.	"To Be a Hero"		1:46
Total length:			50:49

=== Marvel Cinematic Universe tie-ins ===
On references to the larger MCU, Ramirez said "those little Easter eggs that come along the way are fun", but there were times when the writers did not take opportunities to reference the rest of the universe because they felt like distractions from the series' narrative and characters. Petrie stated that the writers wanted to "keep it in Hell's Kitchen" and focus on issues such as "the air conditioner doesn't work at Nelson and Murdock. That's really what we're interested in." He explained that the real life New York City "has a larger than life presence" with celebrities that live there—"If you see Derek Jeter walking down the street, that's great, but then you turn the corner and you get into an argument with the guy who overcharged you for a pretzel. We want our guys to be real New Yorkers."

The season features the motorcycle gang Dogs of Hell, who were first introduced through their Nevada chapter in the Agents of S.H.I.E.L.D. episode "Yes Men", and Roxxon Corporation, a company featured throughout the MCU. It also mentions the vigilantes Jessica Jones and Luke Cage, the death of Oscar Clemons, and the law firm Hogarth, Chao, and Benowitz, which are all references to the first season of Jessica Jones. When Claire Temple first appears in the season, she has "a cut in her eyebrow", which Cox was told would be explained in Luke Cage, saying, "the timeline had been thought through and worked out so that whatever's going on in Luke Cage ... somehow at some point during that show, the next day she's in the hospital talking to me."

== Marketing ==
Footage from the season was shown at New York Comic Con in October 2015, and at Comic Con Experience that December. On February 15, 2016, the first part of the season trailer was released focusing on the Punisher, while the second part focusing on Elektra was released 10 days later, on February 25. Scott Mendelson of Forbes felt the first part is "clearly going for a vibe similar to that first full-length Dark Knight teaser back in December of 2007, with Castle being framed as a natural byproduct of/reaction to Daredevil's own vigilantism". He also appreciated that it appeared Castle would be presented as a villain, as the previous film adaptions of the character always had Castle "still a hero at the end". Mendelson's one drawback to the trailer was when Castle starts "monologue-ing" in the last third, feeling Bernthal "casts such an imposing and grim shadow as a near-silent angel of death that the [haunting and mythological] mood is almost broken". Joanna Robinson at Vanity Fair felt that the premise of the trailer, with Daredevil facing the Punisher, is "right in line with the big superhero trend this spring", comparing it to Captain America: Civil War and Batman v Superman: Dawn of Justice, which feature Captain America fighting Iron Man and Batman fighting Superman, respectively. Robinson wondered if, like those films, the season also has a separate, "bigger bad waiting in the wings to unite our vigilantes" that the trailer is hiding.

On March 7, 2016, the first two episodes of the season premiered in Paris, with a premiere in New York City on March 10. Also in early March, billboards were erected in Toronto featuring character posters for Daredevil, Punisher and Elektra. The series' Twitter account encouraged users to vote for which character was their favorite, with the other two receiving blood and bruises added to their billboards.

== Release ==
=== Streaming ===
The second season of Daredevil was released on March 18, 2016, on the streaming service Netflix worldwide, in Ultra HD 4K. Preparing for the release, Netflix created eight different images to use as cover art for the season on its site. The images were randomly distributed among select subscribers, with Netflix tracking to see which one was the best-performing to eventually use for all subscribers. Netflix also debuted a countdown timer to a percentage of its users worldwide, allowing them to see how long it was until the season would debut. The season was enhanced to be available in high-dynamic-range video after its initial release by post-production vendor Deluxe.

The season, along with the additional Daredevil seasons and the other Marvel Netflix series, was removed from Netflix on March 1, 2022, due to Netflix's license for the series ending and Disney regaining the rights. The season became available on Disney+ in the United States, Canada, United Kingdom, Ireland, Australia, and New Zealand on March 16, ahead of its debut in Disney+'s other markets by the end of 2022.

=== Home media ===
The season was released on DVD in Region 2 and Blu-ray in Region B on May 15, 2017, in Region 4 on June 14, 2017, and in Region 1 and Region A on August 22, 2017.

== Reception ==
=== Audience viewership ===
As Netflix does not reveal subscriber viewership numbers for any of their original series, Symphony Technology Group compiled data for the season based on people using software on their phones that measures television viewing by detecting a program's sound. According to Symphony, the second season of Daredevil had 5.94% of viewers age 18-49 watching in an average minute in the first 32 days following its release. Symphony also estimated that 3.2 million viewers age 18-49 were watching an episode of Daredevil's second season over the average minute in its first weekend of release. The marketing analytics firm Jumpshot determined the season was the most viewed Netflix season in the first 30 days after it premiered. Jumpshot, which "analyzes click-stream data from an online panel of more than 100 million consumers", looked at the viewing behavior and activity of the company's U.S. members, factoring in the relative number of U.S. Netflix viewers who watched at least one episode of the season.

=== Critical response ===
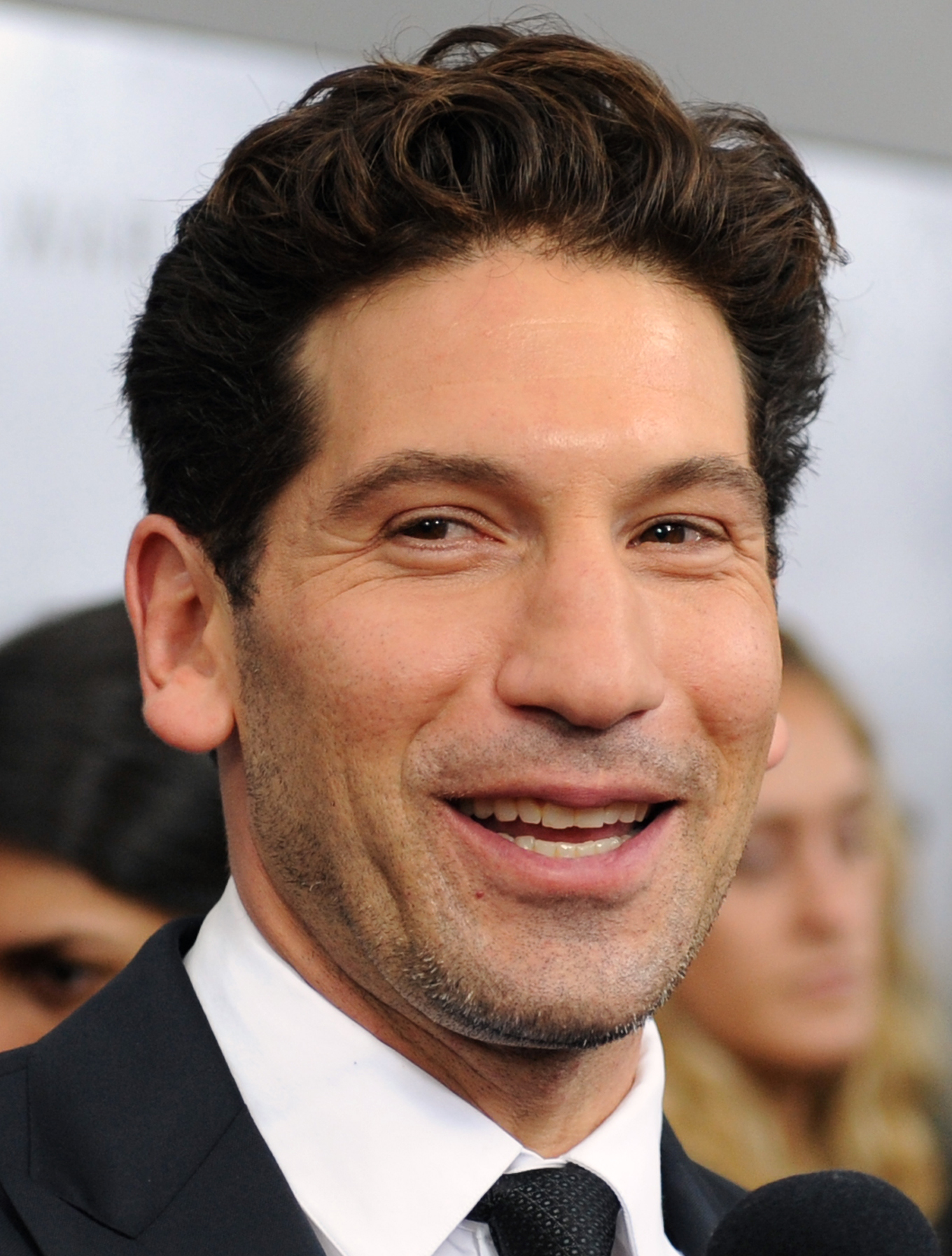
Jon Bernthal's performance as Frank Castle / Punisher was one of the highlights of the series for critics.

The review aggregator website Rotten Tomatoes reported an 81% approval rating with an average rating of 6.90/10 based on 57 reviews. The website's critical consensus reads, "Bolstered by some impressive action, Daredevil keeps its footing in season two, even if its new adversaries can't quite fill the void left by Wilson Fisk." Metacritic, which uses a weighted average, assigned a score of 68 out of 100, based on 13 critics, indicating "generally favorable" reviews.

Reviewing the first seven episodes, Brian Lowry of Variety said, the season begins "on an uneven note", comparing some of the early moments to the works of Sam Peckinpah, "complete with slow-motion bullets and blood sprays. Stick with it, though, and the show blossoms, featuring a few terrific action sequences while introducing into this grim world seminal characters the Punisher and Elektra." Kevin Fitzpatrick of ScreenCrush felt the first seven episodes of the season seemed "to have learned the best of both" from season one and Jessica Jones, "placing its most compelling imagery front and center straightaway, but still taking time to pick apart the characters beneath them, rather than shout platitudes about saving the city". He also praised the castings of Bernthal and Yung as Punisher and Elektra, respectively, and enjoyed "the improved spotlight" for Foggy and Karen, given the reduction of Dawson saying, "So many superhero series struggle to draw its supporting characters as compellingly as the action, and Daredevil's particular blend of set piece and legal thriller feels inescapably original". However, Fitzpatrick did note the series lacked the presence Vondie Curtis-Hall brought as Ben Urich in the first season. He concluded that the season's progression "feels much cleaner" than the first's, "moving almost in acts more than back and forth victories [...] Even the aim feels that much more cohesive, to start in a place of Matt, Foggy and Karen all confident in their new roles, but wrestling with the consequence of their choice to always help the helpless." Merrill Barr of Forbes said, "Daredevil season two is very much the same excellent show Daredevil season one was... but in the places it isn't, it's also very much improved". Barr praised Bernthal as the Punisher, and noted the reduction in the amount of "thick blacks" in the cinematography that the first season was criticized for.

Collider's Chris Cabin also praised the first seven episodes of the season, giving it four stars, and saying that the series "finds overwhelmingly sincere and effective traces of humanity in a genre that has been hard-pressed to feel overtly pre-conceived in its political, societal, and philosophical ideas". He said Daredevil, like Jessica Jones, "feels like a show that is constantly evolving, and consistently searching for challenges". Cabin also felt that "the show's use of sound and image to infer or suggest as much as any line of dialogue [...] continues to set this series apart from its half-measured kin." He added that the season "goes to great lengths to make the stakes of" the moral and ethical issues, as seen by pitting Daredevil's methods against the Punisher, "intensely involving and thrilling," while also praising the action sequences of the season and the "streamlined focus on character in the writing", claiming that "none of the [MCU] films have even an iota of the seductive intimacy and heart of this show." Dennis Perkins writing for The A.V. Club awarded the season a "B+", missing D'Onofrio's "towering menace as Wilson Fisk", but feeling that Bernthal and Yung "make Castle and Elektra an effective season-long two-pronged assault on Matt Murdock's heroic identity, which gives Daredevil's supporting characters a clearer purpose as well." IGN reviewer Matt Fowler, after reviewing all the episodes of season two individually, gave the season a 9.3 out of 10, saying that it "excels at both action and story while giving us a much more complex and layered season than the first. [...] Gone is a notable 'main villain', but instead we're given fantastic performances by not only the main returning cast but by the newly introduced Jon Bernthal and Elodie Yung."

Jack Shepherd of The Independent was slightly more critical of the early episodes of the season, saying the ideological battle between Murdock and Castle "is the crux of these first few episodes and also highlights the main problem with Daredevil" pointing out that "there is no real bad guy here" and there "is only so many times you can watch an episode end with Daredevil and Punisher beating each other up before you start thinking there is a glitch in the Matrix." He also agreed with Fitzpatick regarding Curtis-Hall's presence as Ben Urich not being filled in the season. Despite this, Shepherd added that the season began to pick up by the fourth episode, with the introduction of Elektra, capping with episodes six and seven, which he called "by far the season's best, laying the foundation for an exciting story ahead", while also praising Cox, Henson, Woll, Bernthal and Yung for their performances. Daniel Fienberg, reviewing the first seven episodes for The Hollywood Reporter, expressed similar sentiments as Shepherd, feeling the episodes missed what Vincent D'Onofrio brought as Wilson Fisk in the first season, or at least "the through-line threat that he presented...Fortunately, the [Punisher and Elektra] are vividly realized and the action is still visceral and brutal and maybe the big picture will emerge in the season's second half. Because of the portrayals of those two characters, he felt "that there's a challenge to remain wholly invested in plotlines that don't involve them". Despite being "right on the edge of desensitization" regarding the fight scenes, Fienberg still praised them, highlighting the different styles Elektra and the Punisher used "vary[ing] the dynamic enough".

Entertainment Weekly's Jeff Jensen award the season a "C", calling it "a straight-up disappointment". Calling the early episodes with Daredevil's face-off with the Punisher "skimpy and sluggish from the get-go", Jensen also added that they were "a flatline of inert drama, with long scenes of windy exposition or dull skulking interrupted by the occasional well-staged if ridiculously gory fight sequence." Jensen added that "hope for improvement" came with the introduction of Elektra, and that the sixth episode should be a template for the rest of the season, which ultimately, he felt was "stiff and silly." Daniel D'Addario for Time was also disappointed with the season, saying, "it's hard not to feel that one is being taken for a long, and not particularly enjoyable, ride [...] Daredevil just wants to dole out fun doses of extreme gore on the path to an endpoint on a business plan. Any viewer committed to story is left searching in the dark." Vulture's Abraham Riesman joined the criticism, calling the seven episodes reviewed "a dour parade of one cliché after another, recycling themes, images, and rhetoric that audiences have seen countless times before." Though he wouldn't call it "bad", he felt that with all the other superhero content released in the same year, "it feels woefully unnecessary." However, he did praise Bernthal's performance, saying it was "another excitingly sympathetic antagonist" after D'Onofrio's "standout performance" as Fisk in the first season, but was "nowhere near as fun". In contrast to the first season of Jessica Jones, which Riesman called Marvel's "first attempt to depict sex in any kind of realistic way", he called the second season of Daredevil "astoundingly un-sexy."

=== Accolades ===
Got Your 6, which "champions positive portrayals of military veterans in Hollywood", deemed "Semper Fidelis" to be "6 Certified" for "responsibly and accurately portray[ing] veterans via the character of Frank Castle, The Punisher, who insists that his legal representation not perpetuate veteran stereotypes of PTSD in order to defend his actions". Daredevil was included on Hidden Remote's Best TV Series of 2016 list, ranking 4th. Comic Book Resources named "Seven Minutes in Heaven" and "Penny and Dime" as the 12th and 2nd best episodes in 2016 among comic book-related television series, respectively.

Year	Award	Category	Nominee(s)	Result	Ref.
2016	Got Your 6	6 Certified – for "a representative and balanced depiction of veterans"	"Semper Fidelis"	Won	
2016	Online Film & Television Association Award	Best Sound in a Series	Daredevil	Nominated	
2016	Primetime Creative Arts Emmy Awards	Outstanding Sound Editing for a Series	"New York's Finest"	Nominated	
2016	Primetime Creative Arts Emmy Awards	Outstanding Stunt Coordination for a Drama Series, Limited Series or Movie	Philip J. Silvera	Nominated	
2017	Saturn Awards	Best New Media Television Series	Daredevil	Nominated	
2017	Saturn Awards	Best Actor on Television	Charlie Cox	Nominated	
2017	Screen Actors Guild Awards	Outstanding Performance by a Stunt Ensemble in a Television Series	Daredevil	Nominated	
