= Got Your 6 =

- Founded: 2012; 14 years ago
- Founder: Chris Marvin
- Purpose: Veterans Affairs
- Region served: United States
- Parent organization: Bob Woodruff Foundation
- Website: gotyour6.bobwoodrufffoundation.org

Got Your 6 is a national network of veteran service providers, managed by the Bob Woodruff Foundation. In 2018, the Bob Woodruff Foundation acquired veteran nonprofit Got Your 6 and relaunched the brand in 2020 as the organization's “enduring commitment to the veteran community.” The Got Your 6 Network includes community-based collaborative initiatives encompassing thousands of veteran-serving organizations, as well as individual partner organizations and programs. Through Got Your 6, the Bob Woodruff Foundation provides funding as well as no-cost learning and networking opportunities to help partners “achieve the maximum positive impact on their local veteran and military community.” Got Your 6 also produces public awareness campaigns to show support for the military and veteran community and educate the public on ways to support veterans.

== History ==
Originally founded in 2012 by US Army veteran, Chris Marvin, Got Your 6 was a nonprofit organization working to ensure veterans were portrayed more accurately in film and television. In May 2012, it was announced that a collection of entertainment industry and media companies were joining with twenty-four nonprofit organizations for a campaign to create awareness of veterans' issues such as employment, health, housing, and education. Some of these issues also formed the six "pillars" of the organization which included jobs, education, housing, health, family, and leadership. Focusing on each of these "pillars", the organization set out various goals and targets related to them such as 500,000 jobs for veterans, housing 10,000 chronically homeless veterans, and the completion of 1.5 million volunteer service hours by veterans. All of the commitments were expected to be formalized by Clinton Global Initiative. Participating entertainment companies consisted of A+E Networks, American Broadcasting Company, Bad Robot Productions, Creative Artists Agency, CBS Corporation, Directors Guild of America, Entertainment Industries Council, Entertainment Industry Foundation, Fox Audience Strategy, foursquare, Funny or Die, HBO, International Creative Management, NBCUniversal, Paramount Pictures, Producers Guild of America, SAG-AFTRA, Shine America, Showtime Networks, Sony Pictures Entertainment, United Talent Agency, Viacom Media Networks, Warner Bros., William Morris Endeavor, and Writers Guild of America, West. The organization was expected to use their partner organizations' resources such as ilm, television, gaming, print, radio, outdoor media and social media platforms to further their message. A public service announcement publicizing the organization was released alongside the announcement which included appearances from Alec Baldwin, Michael Douglas, Tom Hanks, Milla Jovovich, Bradley Cooper, Sarah Jessica Parker, Tracy Morgan, Brian Williams, Pharrell Williams, and Wendy Williams.

A year later, the organization partnered with Macy's for a new "American Icons" campaign where the retailer offered a "Got Your 6" logo pin and a special savings pass for $6 at their stores nationwide. Additionally, the also released a new PSA featuring singer Gavin DeGraw. By 2017, Macy's reported that they had raised more than $8.3 million for the organization. That Veterans Day, the organization recruited country music singers who attended that year's Country Music Association Awards to take part in another PSA for the non-profit. Artists included Taylor Swift, Florida Georgia Line, Kenny Rogers, and Cassadee Pope.

In January 2014, it was announced that the organization was receiving funds from the Lone Survivor Fund, created by Lone Survivor director Peter Berg, along with two other veterans organizations. The fund raised over $100,000 during the opening weekend of that film largely through private screenings. Later that October, it was reported that MTV had partnered with the organization on a new documentary titled MTV's Got Your 6 that follows four military veterans as they return from Afghanistan and attempt to return to their communities and past lives. The documentary was produced by Karga Seven Pictures and executive producers included Dave Sirulnick, Jonathan Mussman, Sarah Wetherbee, Kelly Mcpherson, Emre Sahin and Kim Kanter. The film premiered on MTV on November 11, 2014.

Beginning in 2017, the organization began to release a list of films, television programs, and theatrical productions that they say portray veterans in a more accurate light. The list of productions from 2016 included One Day at a Time, Patriots Day, Six, The War Horse News, and Blueprint Specials. The list of productions from 2017 included The Gifted, Disjointed, Last Flag Flying, The Long Road Home, and Returning the Favor. In November 2017, it was also announced that the organization had partnered with Veterans in Media and Entertainment on a new fellowship program, the Veterans Fellowship Program, designed to help military veterans build careers in the entertainment industry. The initiative was expected to be funded by Got Your 6 and Macy's. The fellowship includes the pairing of veterans with mentors, monthly educational and training sessions, and networking events. Media companies taking part in the fellowship included 21st Century Fox, NBCUniversal, CBS, HBO, Viacom, Paramount Pictures, Sony Pictures Entertainment, Lionsgate, A+E Networks, Live Nation Entertainment, United Talent Agency, 44 Blue, The Ebersol Lanigan Company, DreamWorks Animation, Endemol Shine North America, and Valhalla Entertainment.

In July 2018, it was announced that the organization had been acquired by the Bob Woodruff Foundation. Later that November, Got Your 6 reported on the success of the Veterans Fellowship Program in its first year citing the placement of 35 veterans with various media partners and the addition of Hollywood Foreign Press Association, TNT, TBS, and A Really Good Home Pictures as new collaborators.

== Acquisition and Relaunch ==
In 2018, the Bob Woodruff Foundation acquired Got Your 6. Since reconceiving the brand as a Bob Woodruff Foundation initiative in 2020, Got Your 6 has launched public awareness and education campaigns encouraging people to show veterans they've “got their six”: a 9/11 tribute featuring Staff Sergeant Michael Kacer, Lance Corporal Sarah Rudder, Matthew Broderick, Caroline Hirsch, Craig Newmark, Howard Lutnick, Lena Dunham, Jenna Bush Hager, Iliza Shlesinger, Fran Drescher, Lady A, Debra Messing, Colin Quinn, Bob Woodruff, and Lee Woodruff; radio and social media spots voiced by Bob Woodruff and Rita Moreno; messages on the Times Square jumbotron; and publications including LA Times Magazine. In 2021, Got Your 6 debuted “Leaders Eat Last,” an original panel series focused on food insecurity, supported by Craig Newmark Philanthropies.

Got Your 6 is supported by sponsorships. As of December 2021, corporate partners included Craig Newmark Philanthropies, Dave & Busters, Pendleton Whiskey, Pep Boys, Veterans on Wall Street, the National Football League, Alliance Data, H.C.S. Foundation, Citi, HSBC, the State of Qatar's Qatar Harvey Fund, TriWest, UBS, Wells Fargo, Ann G. And James B. Ritchey Foundation, Toyota, Vehicles for Veterans, Philip Morris International, the Steven & Alexandra Cohen Foundation, Barclays, Cantor Fitzgerald, PayPal, RBC Capital Markets, Balyasny Asset Management, Bank of America, The Barbara Bradley Baekgaard Family Foundation, Valley Guard Supply, Bank of the West, BNP Paribas, BioCatch, BlackRock, Bloomberg Philanthropies, Bridgewater, Citadel, Academy Securities, AmeriVet Securities, Ares, CME Group, Cushman & Wakefield, Drexel Hamilton, DTCC, Macquarie, MetLife, Quinn Emanuel, Santander, Senator, Skadden, and Tudor Investment Corporation.
