= PBR Velocity Tour =

PBR Pendleton Whisky Velocity Tour
- Formerly: PBR BlueDEF Velocity Tour (2014–2016); PBR Real Time Pain Relief Velocity Tour (2017–2018)
- Sport: Bull riding
- Founded: January 19, 2014; 12 years ago
- First season: 2014
- Organizing body: Professional Bull Riders
- Country: United States
- Sponsors: BlueDEF (2014–2016); Real Time Pain Relief (2017–2018); Pendleton Whisky (2019–present)
- Promotion to: PBR Touring Pro Division
- Relegation to: Unleash the Beast Series

The PBR Pendleton Whisky Velocity Tour (PWVT) is a professional bull riding tour organized by the Professional Bull Riders (PBR). Established in 2014, the tour was created as a secondary competition series to provide bull riders with additional opportunities to compete and advance within the PBR system.

The Velocity Tour hosts events throughout the United States and features both established riders and developing competitors. Riders earn points and prize money throughout the season, with the tour serving as a pathway to PBR's premier series and the PBR World Finals. The tour also holds a season-ending Velocity Tour Finals event to determine its season champion.

From 2014 to 2016, the Velocity Tour's title sponsor was BlueDEF, thus going by the PBR BlueDEF Velocity Tour. In 2017, Real Time Pain Relief took over as the title sponsor and the tour was renamed to the PBR Real Time Pain Relief Velocity Tour. In 2019, Pendleton Whisky took over as the tour's title sponsor.

== History ==
On January 19, 2014, it was announced that Anschutz Entertainment Group (AEG) and Professional Bull Riders (PBR) were partnering to create a new professional bull riding circuit called PBR Velocity. The tour was planned as a supplement to the PBR's Built Ford Tough Series, featuring both emerging riders and established veterans.

On March 11, 2014, it was announced that Peak's BlueDEF diesel exhaust fluid would be the tour's title sponsor. The tour's first season started on March 15 in Hampton, Virginia.

== Champions ==
Season	Champion	Points	Runner-up	Points	Ref.
2014	(United States) Jason Malone	652.78	(United States) Jay Miller	589.26	
2015	(United States) Gage Gay	530.00	(Brazil) Kaique Pacheco	355.00	
2016	(United States) Chase Outlaw	457.50	(United States) Nathan Schaper	382.50	
2017 (Note: Marcilio and de Lima finished tied with 367.5 points in the 2017 standings. Under the tour's tiebreaker rules, Marcilio was awarded the championship because he had earned more money at Velocity Tour events during the season.)	(Brazil) Alex Marcilio	367.50	(Brazil) Ramon de Lima	367.50	
2018	(Brazil) Alisson De Souza	410.00	(United States) Chase Outlaw	335.00	
2019	(Brazil) José Vitor Leme	1,017.50	(United States) Taylor Toves	517.50	
2020 (Note: Taylor and Oliver finished tied with 94 points in the 2020 standings. After winning the Velocity Tour Finals, Taylor was awarded the championship.)	(United States) Mason Taylor	94.00	(United States) Kyler Oliver	94.00	
2021	(Brazil) Adriano Salgado	146.50	(United States) Michael Lane	120.00	
2022	(United States) Clayton Sellars	116.08	(United States) Cody Jesus	111.00	
2023	(United States) Josh Frost	680.50	(Brazil) Claudio Montanha Jr.	567.00	
2024	(United States) Grayson Cole	742.00	(Brazil) Ederson Santos	701.50	
2025	(United States) Marcus Mast	775.50	(Brazil) Afonso Quintino	763.00	
2026	(United States) Grayson Cole (2)	655.00	(Australia) Macaulie Leather	611.00	
