= Chris Marvin =

US Army helicopter pilot and businessman

Personal details
- Born: Christopher Michael Marvin; April 2, 1979 (age 47) Normal, Illinois, U.S.
- Profession: Consultant; Nonprofit Executive; Public Speaker
- Awards: Bronze Star; Meritorious Service Medal; Air Medal

Military service
- Allegiance: United States of America
- Branch/service: United States Army
- Years of service: 2001 – 2009
- Rank: Captain
- Battles/wars: Operation Enduring Freedom

Christopher Michael Marvin (born April 2, 1979) is a former United States Army helicopter pilot. He is the founder and former executive director of Got Your 6, a campaign that works with studios, networks and agencies in the entertainment industry, to shift perceptions of veterans and military families. He is now the principal at Marvin Strategies, a consulting practice focused on veteran-related strategy and communication.

== Early life and education ==
Marvin was born and raised in Central Illinois. He holds a Bachelor of Business Administration from the University of Notre Dame and Masters in Business Administration from the Wharton School of the University of Pennsylvania.

== Military service ==
Marvin served more than seven years as a US Army Officer and Black Hawk helicopter pilot, leading an aviation platoon in Afghanistan. He was named the Distinguished Honor Graduate of his Aviation Officer Basic Course and was assigned to the 25th Infantry Division.

In Afghanistan, he flew 40 combat missions before being severely wounded in a helicopter crash near the Afghan-Pakistan border, which ended his military career. As a result of the crash, crew chief Sgt. Daniel Galvin was killed. Marvin spent four years recovering from his wounds, and during that time he began volunteering as an advocate for other wounded veterans.

== Volunteer Service ==
Marvin was named the first Mission Continues fellow in 2007 and developed the organization's original slogan “It's not a charity, it's a challenge.” As the national director of the Fellowship Program, he logged more than 2,000 volunteer hours in 2008 for The Mission Continues before joining the organization as full-time staff in 2009.

He has also been the director of civilian-military partnerships for ServiceNation where he headed the Mission Serve initiative. and oversaw service projects in 11 major American cities on 11/11/11, in honor of Veterans Day.

Marvin served as a commissioner for the Bipartisan Policy Center's Commission on Political Reform. He is a Truman National Security Fellow and a Presidio Institute Cross Sector Leadership Fellow.

== Got Your 6 ==
Chris Marvin is the founder and former executive director of the national veteran campaign Got Your 6. The organization was founded in 2012 as a coalition of entertainment industry companies, and nonprofit organizations focused on veterans and military families.

In 2015, Marvin departed Got Your 6 to launch a consulting practice focused on veteran-related strategy and communication.

== Awards and honors ==
Chris Marvin's military awards include the Bronze Star, Meritorious Service Medal, and the Air Medal. His work with Got Your 6 has been recognized with awards from the National Conference on Citizenship, Points of Light, Goodwill Industries, and the Clinton Global Initiative.
