= Peter Pace =

16th Chairman of the Joint Chiefs of Staff

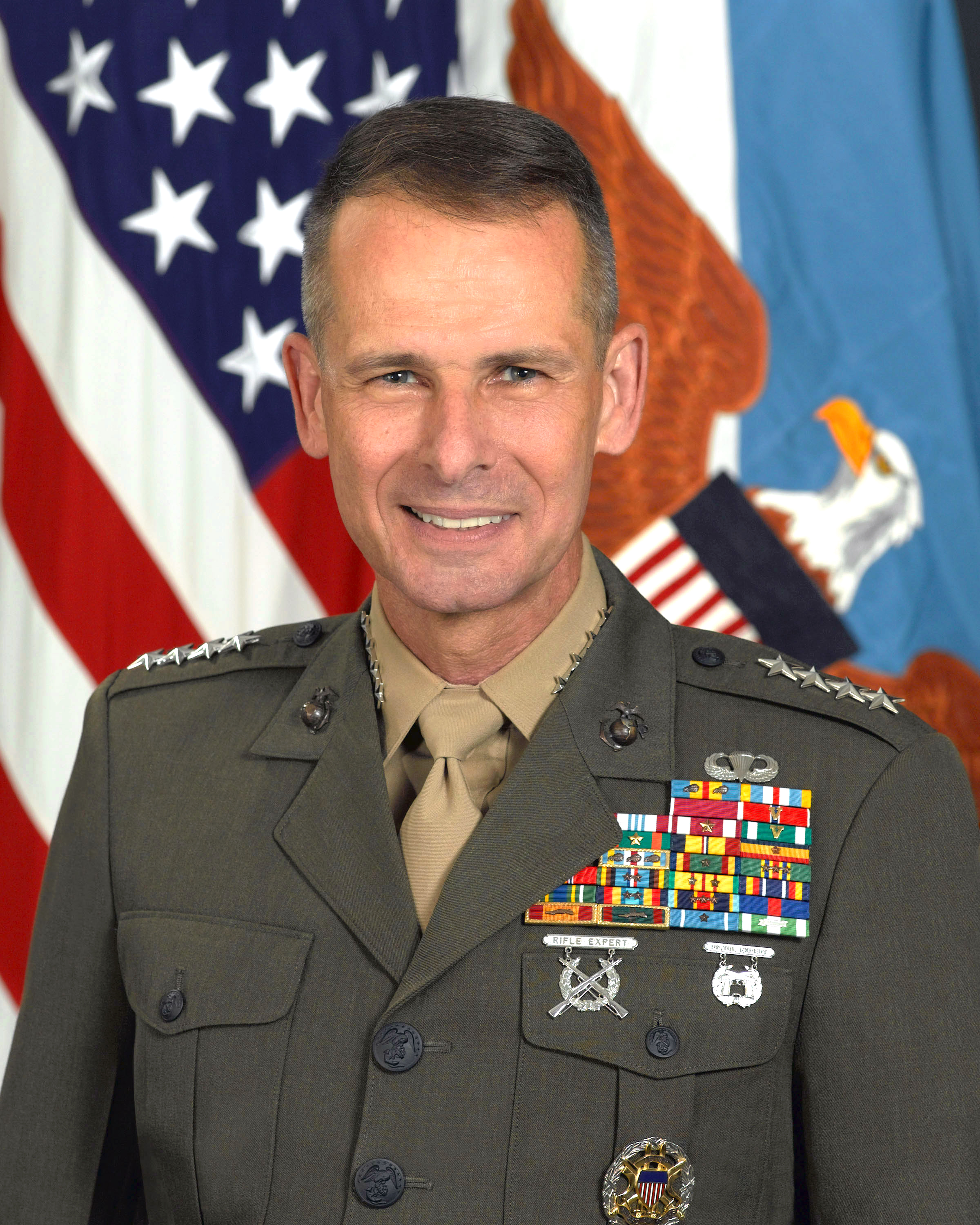
- Official portrait, 2006
- Born: November 5, 1945 (age 80); New York City, New York, U.S.
- Education: United States Naval Academy (BS); George Washington University (MBA)
- Military career
- Allegiance: United States
- Branch: United States Marine Corps
- Service years: 1967–2007
- Rank: General
- Commands: Chairman of the Joint Chiefs of Staff; Vice Chairman of the Joint Chiefs of Staff; U.S. Southern Command; Marine Forces Atlantic; 2nd Battalion, 1st Marines
- Conflicts: Vietnam War; Operation Restore Hope
- Awards: Defense Distinguished Service Medal (4); Navy Distinguished Service Medal; Army Distinguished Service Medal; Air Force Distinguished Service Medal; Coast Guard Distinguished Service Medal; Defense Superior Service Medal; Legion of Merit; Bronze Star Medal with valor Defense Meritorious Service Medal

Peter Pace (born November 5, 1945) is a retired United States Marine Corps general who served as the 16th chairman of the Joint Chiefs of Staff. Pace was the first Marine officer appointed as chairman and the first Marine officer to be appointed to three different four-star assignments; the others were as the sixth vice chairman of the Joint Chiefs of Staff from October 1, 2001, to August 12, 2005, and as Commander-in-Chief, U.S. Southern Command from September 8, 2000, to September 30, 2001. Appointed chairman by President George W. Bush, Pace succeeded U.S. Air Force General Richard Myers on September 30, 2005.

Secretary of Defense Robert Gates announced on June 8, 2007, that he would advise the President to not renominate Pace for a second term. Pace retired from the Marine Corps and stepped down as chairman on October 1, 2007. He was replaced by Chief of Naval Operations Admiral Michael Mullen.

== Early life and education ==
Pace was born on November 5, 1945, in New York City's Brooklyn to Italian parents from Noci and raised in Teaneck, New Jersey, graduating from Teaneck High School in 1963.

He entered the United States Naval Academy as a midshipman in 1963. He earned a varsity letter in soccer and graduated on 7 June 1967 with a degree in mechanical engineering. Upon graduation, Pace received his commission as a second lieutenant in the Marine Corps. His choice to become a Marine was influenced, in part, by his older brother Simone, who graduated from the Academy two years ahead of him and became a Marine. (His brother saw combat in Vietnam, where he earned a Silver Star and a Purple Heart.)

He also holds a Master of Business Administration degree from George Washington University. Pace currently resides in Charlotte, North Carolina; he is married to Lynne Pace, whom he met as a midshipman. They have a son, also named Peter, and a daughter, Tiffany. Pace is a Roman Catholic.

== Career ==
=== 1968–1979 ===
Upon completion of The Basic School at Marine Corps Base Quantico, Virginia, in 1968, Pace was assigned to the 2nd Battalion, 5th Marines, 1st Marine Division in the Republic of Vietnam, serving first as Platoon Leader of Golf Company's Second Platoon and subsequently as assistant Operations Officer.

Returning from overseas in March 1969, he reported to Marine Barracks, Washington, D.C. During this tour, he served as head of the Infantry Writer Unit, Marine Corps Institute; platoon leader, Guard Company; security detachment commander, Camp David; White House social aide; and platoon leader, Special Ceremonial Platoon. He was promoted to captain in April 1971. In September 1971, Pace attended the Infantry Officers' Advanced Course at Fort Benning, Georgia. Returning overseas in October 1972, he was assigned to the Security Element, Marine Aircraft Group 15, 1st Marine Aircraft Wing, Namphong, Thailand, where he served as operations officer and then Executive Officer.

In October 1973, he was assigned to Headquarters Marine Corps, Washington, D.C., for duty as the assistant majors' monitor. During October 1976, he reported to the 1st Marine Division, Marine Corps Base Camp Pendleton, California, where he served as operations officer, 2nd Battalion, 5th Marines; executive officer, 3rd Battalion, 5th Marines; and division staff secretary. He was promoted to major on November 1, 1977. In August 1979, he reported to the Marine Corps Command and Staff College as a student.

=== 1980–1988 ===
Upon completion of school in June 1980, he was assigned duty as commanding officer, Marine Corps Recruiting Station, Buffalo, New York. While in this assignment, he was promoted to lieutenant colonel in October 1982. Reassigned to the 1st Marine Division, Camp Pendleton, Pace served from June 1983 until June 1985 as commanding officer, 2nd Battalion, 1st Marines. In June 1985, he was selected to attend the National War College in Washington, D.C.

After graduation the following June, he was assigned to the Combined/Joint Staff in Seoul, South Korea. He served as chief, Ground Forces Branch until April 1987, when he became executive officer to the assistant chief of staff, C/J/G3, United Nations Command/Combined Forces Command/United States Forces Korea/Eighth United States Army. Pace returned to Marine Barracks in Washington, D.C., in August 1988 for duty as commanding officer. He was promoted to colonel in October 1988.

=== 1990s ===
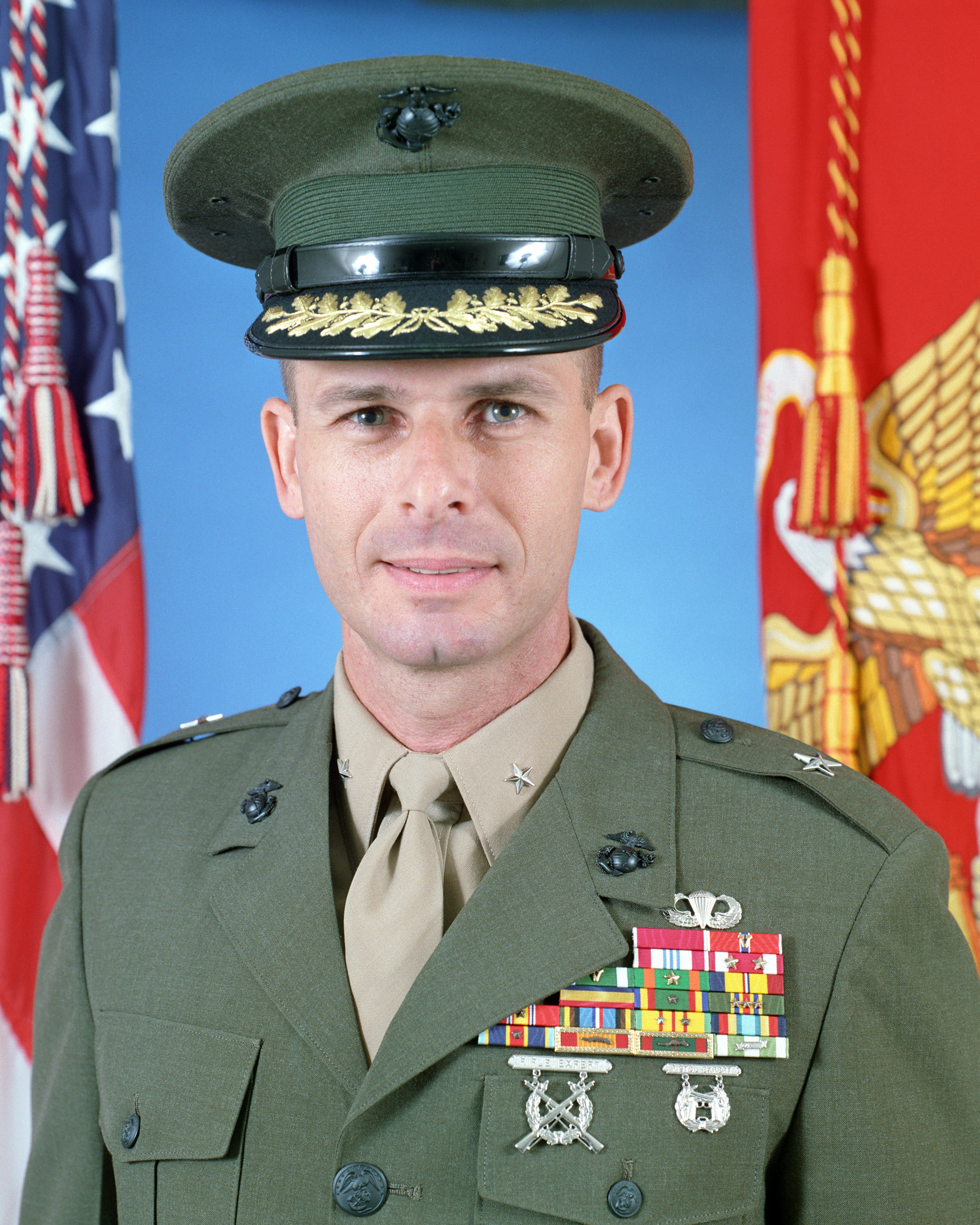
Pace as a brigadier general in 1992.

In August 1991, Pace was assigned duty as chief of staff, 2nd Marine Division, Camp Lejeune. During February 1992, he was assigned duty as assistant division commander. He was advanced to brigadier general on April 6, 1992, and was assigned as president of the Marine Corps University and commanding general of Marine Corps Schools at the Marine Corps Combat Development Command, Quantico, Virginia, on July 13, 1992. While serving in this capacity, he also served as deputy commander, Marine Forces, Somalia, from December 1992 to February 1993, and as the deputy commander, Joint Task Force – Somalia from October 1993 to March 1994. Pace was advanced to major general on June 21, 1994, and was assigned as the deputy commander/chief of staff, U.S. Forces, Japan. He was promoted to lieutenant general and assigned as the director for operations (J-3), Joint Staff, Washington, D.C., on August 5, 1996.

Pace served as the commander, U.S. Marine Corps Forces, Atlantic/Europe/South from November 23, 1997, to September 8, 2000.

=== 2000s: Joint Chiefs of Staff ===
Pace was promoted to general and assumed duties as the commander-in-chief of United States Southern Command on September 8, 2000, until September 30, 2001, when he was appointed Vice Chairman of the Joint Chiefs of Staff. On August 12, 2005, he was succeeded as vice chairman by Admiral Edmund P. Giambastiani.

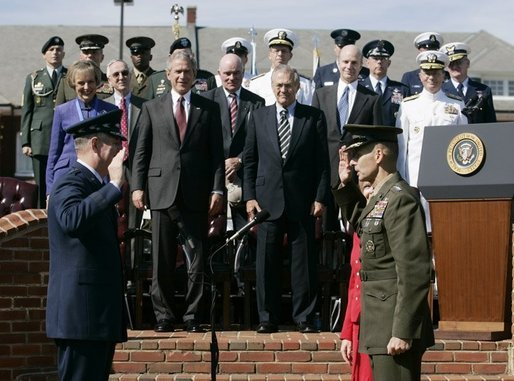
Pace is sworn in as Chairman of the Joint Chiefs of Staff by outgoing Chairman Richard Myers, September 30, 2005.

On April 22, 2005, at a White House press conference, President George W. Bush nominated Pace to be the next chairman of the Joint Chiefs of Staff. The previous chairman, Richard Myers, retired from the position on September 30, 2005.

On his nomination, Pace said, "This is an incredible moment for me. It is both exhilarating and humbling. It's exhilarating because I have the opportunity, if confirmed by the Senate, to continue to serve this great nation. It's humbling because I know the challenges ahead are formidable."

On June 29, 2005, Pace appeared before the Armed Services Committee for consideration of his nomination and was later confirmed by the Senate. On September 30, 2005, Pace was sworn in as the 16th chairman of the Joint Chiefs of Staff.

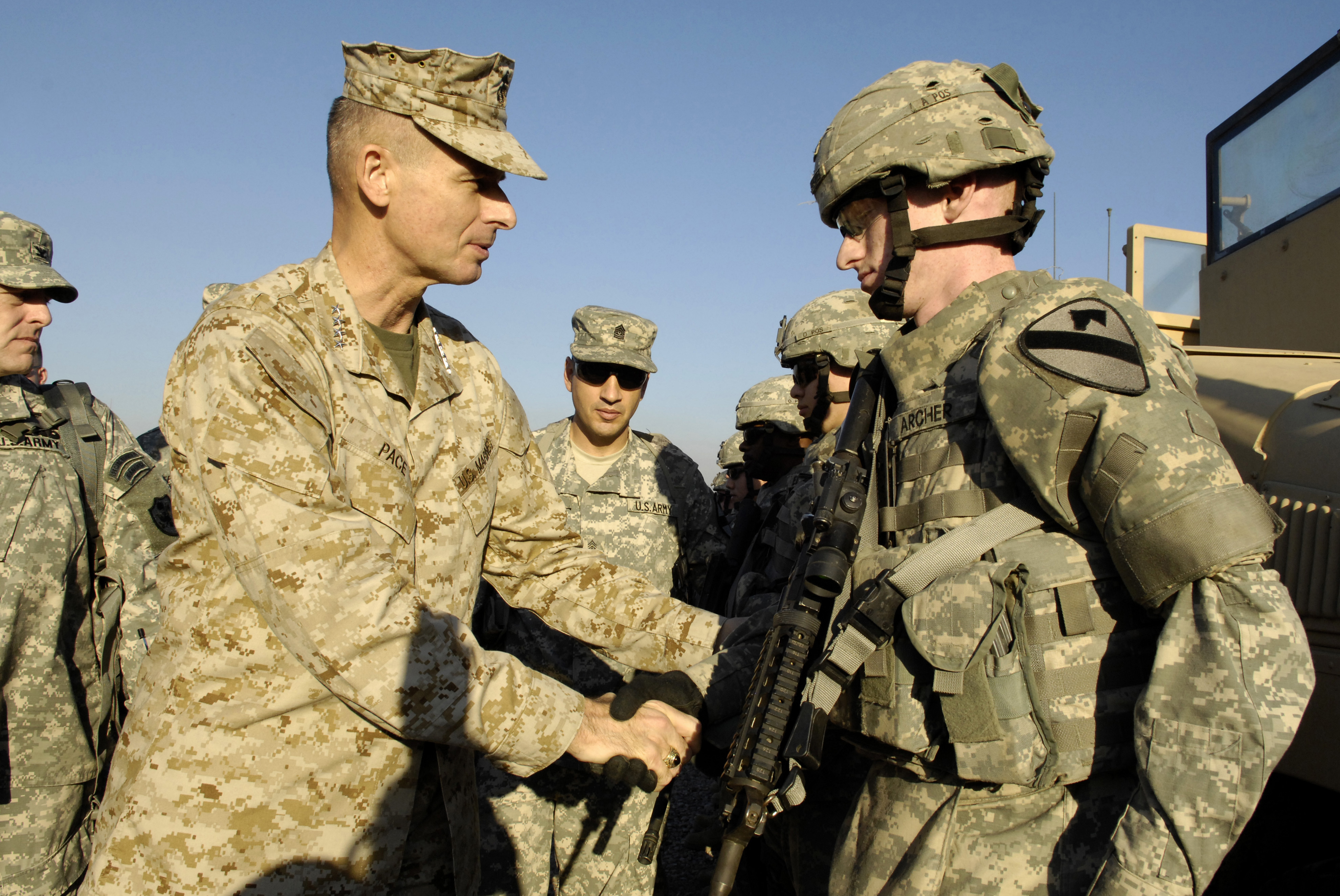
General Pace meeting with soldiers of the 1st Cavalry Division in Iraq in December 2006

On November 29, 2005, Pace was present at a press conference given by US Secretary of Defense Donald Rumsfeld, where Rumsfeld said that "the United States does not have a responsibility" to prevent torture by Iraqi officials. Pace drew a distinction between the national responsibility of the United States and the responsibility of individual service members, saying "It is the absolute responsibility of every U.S. service member, if they see inhumane treatment being conducted, to intervene, to stop it".

In 2006 Pace was named Grand Marshal of New York City's Columbus Day parade.

In a 2007 interview with the Chicago Tribune, Pace was asked about the don't ask, don't tell policy and said "I believe that homosexual acts between individuals are immoral and that we should not condone immoral acts... I do not believe that the armed forces of the United States are well served by a saying through our policies that it's OK to be immoral in any way." The comments sparked backlash from legislators such as Senator John Warner, Speaker Nancy Pelosi, and Congressman Marty Meehan. Pace later said he regretted the comments and that they were his "personal moral views."

After White House officials asserted that Iran was supplying insurgents in Iraq with munitions, Pace questioned the validity of the claim in a February 2007 press conference. Specifically, Pace questioned the existence of direct evidence linking the Iranian government to the supply of the weapons, explosively formed penetrators.

=== Retirement ===
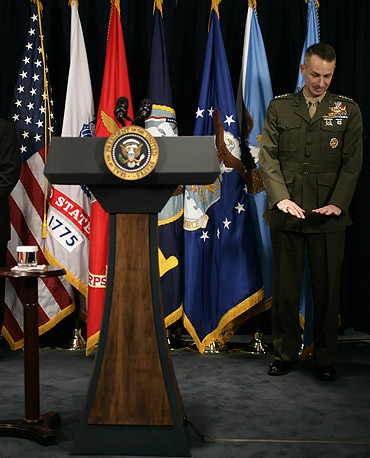
Pace awaiting President George W. Bush in the auditorium of the Eisenhower Executive Office Building for a ceremony honoring his service as Chairman of the Joint Chiefs of Staff.

On June 8, 2007, Defense Secretary Robert Gates announced that he would advise the President to not renominate Pace because of concerns about contentious confirmation hearings in Congress. The President instead nominated the Chief of Naval Operations, Admiral Michael Mullen, to replace Pace. On October 1, 2007, Pace officially retired at Fort Myer, Virginia.

On one of his last days before retirement, Pace gave a speech at Chaminade High School on Long Island, the high school of the first Marine who died under his command in Vietnam, Guido Farinaro.

After his retirement ceremony, Pace visited the Vietnam Veterans Memorial in Washington, D.C. There, he left handwritten notes in memory of each of the Marines who died under his command while he was a platoon leader in Vietnam, with a set of his general's rank insignia attached to each one. Each note was similar to this one:

These are yours – not mine! With love and respect, your platoon leader, Pete Pace.

=== Post-military career ===
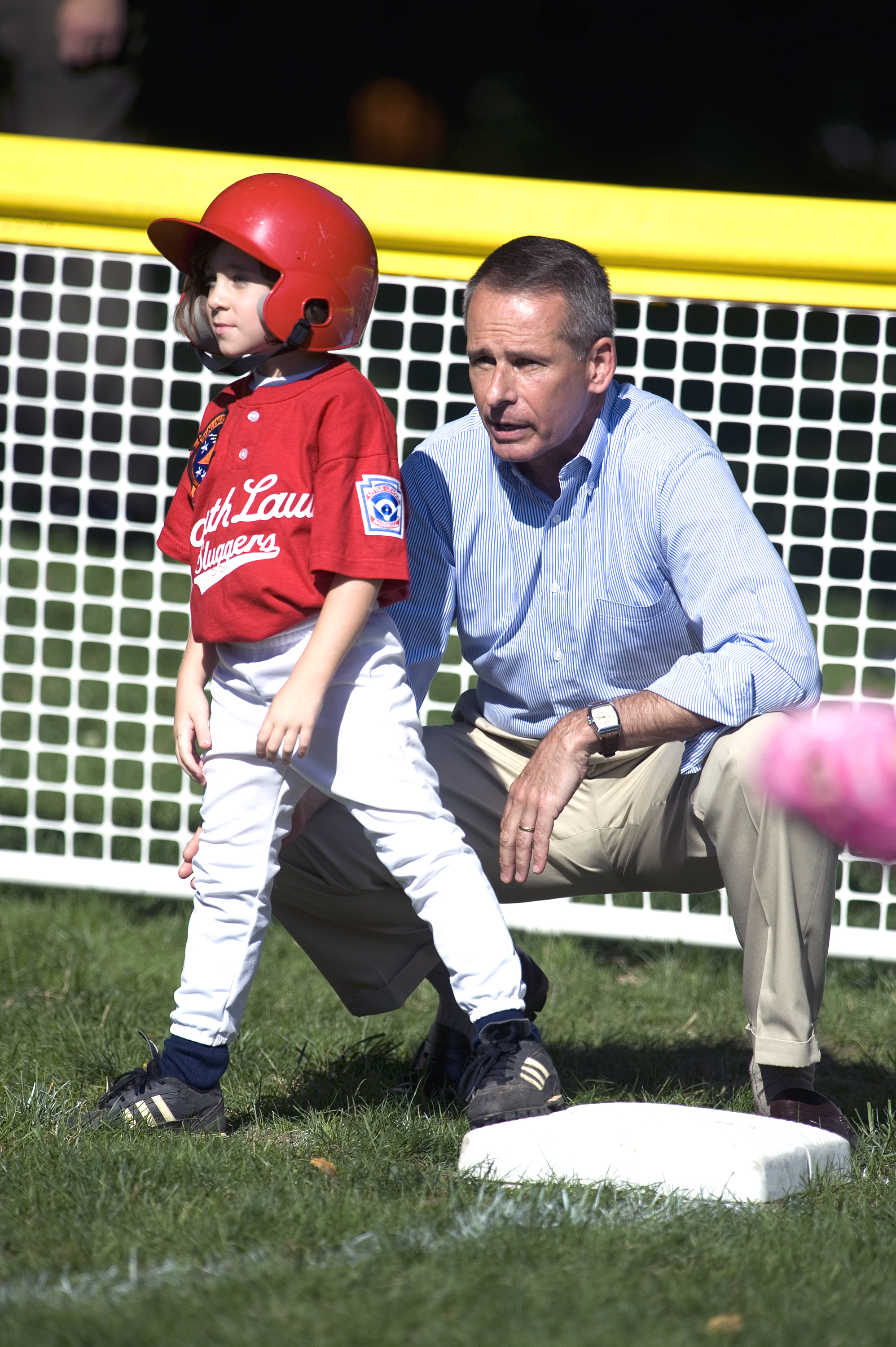
Pace at the 20th White House Tee Ball Initiative in 2008.

On October 1, 2007, the editors of the National Review encouraged Virginia voters to draft Pace to run in 2008 for the Senate seat to be vacated by retiring Senator John Warner. The magazine cited Pace's conservative Catholic beliefs in making its suggestion.

On April 3, 2008, private equity firm Behrman Capital announced that Pace had joined the firm as an operating partner and been named chairman of the board of Behrman portfolio company, Pelican Products. He was also named a director of ILC Industries, Inc., also a Behrman company.

Pace also currently serves on the Secretary of Defense's Policy Board, and as chairman of the board for Wall Street Warfighters Foundation, an organization founded by principals of Drexel Hamilton that provides training support and job placement services for disabled veterans interested in careers in the financial services industry.

Pace serves on the board of advisors of the Code of Support Foundation, a nonprofit military service organization.

During the 2016 United States presidential election, the Trump transition team chaired by New Jersey governor Chris Christie recommended Pace to be Trump's National Security Advisor.

Since 2017, he has served on the Board of Advisors for Angeleno Group, a private equity and venture capital firm focused on sustainable energy investments.

Pace became chair of the board of trustees for the Naval Institute Foundation on January 31, 2017. Founded in 1873, the US Naval Institute provides an independent forum for the Navy, Marine Corps and Coast Guard.

== Dates of rank ==
Insignia	Rank	Date
	Second lieutenant	June 7, 1967
	First lieutenant	September 7, 1968
	Captain	March 1, 1971
	Major	August 1, 1977
	Lieutenant colonel	October 1, 1982
	Colonel	October 1, 1988
	Brigadier general	April 6, 1992
	Major general	June 21, 1994
	Lieutenant general	August 5, 1996
	General	September 8, 2000

== Awards and decorations ==
=== Military and foreign awards ===
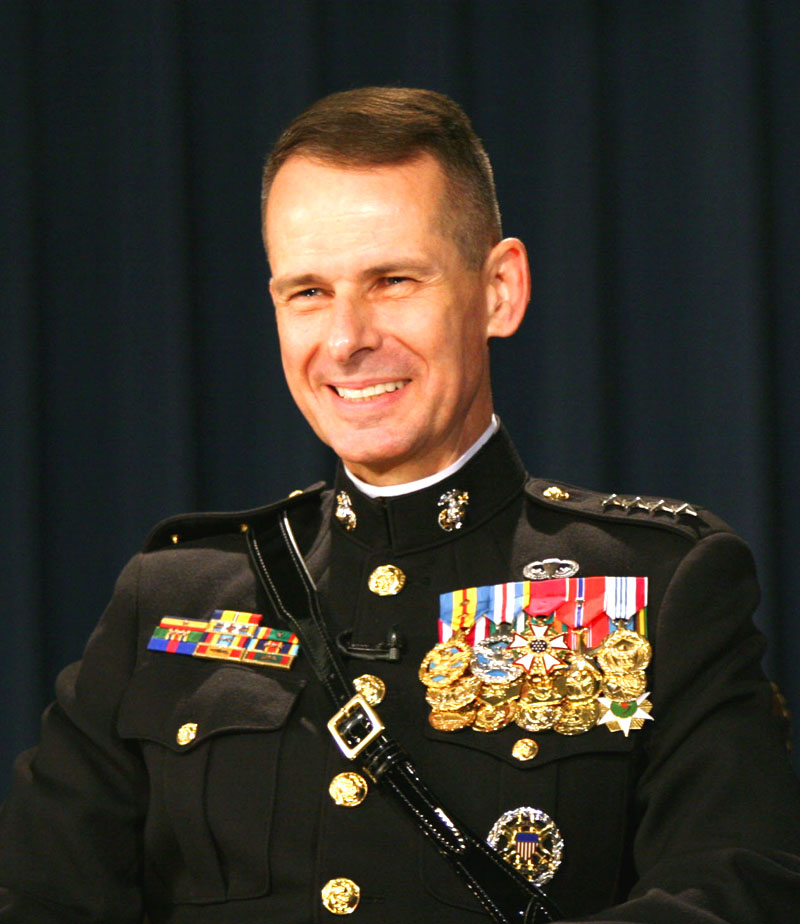
Pace wearing his medals, ribbons, and four stars.

Pace's personal decorations include:

Badge	Basic Parachutist Badge			
1st row	Defense Distinguished Service Medal w/ 3 oak leaf clusters	Navy Distinguished Service Medal	Army Distinguished Service Medal	Air Force Distinguished Service Medal
2nd row	Coast Guard Distinguished Service Medal	Defense Superior Service Medal	Legion of Merit	Bronze Star w/ valor device
3rd row	Defense Meritorious Service Medal	Meritorious Service Medal w/ 1 award star	Navy and Marine Corps Commendation Medal w/ valor device	Navy and Marine Corps Achievement Medal w/ 1 award star
4th row	Combat Action Ribbon	Navy Presidential Unit Citation w/ 1 service star	Joint Meritorious Unit Award w/ 3 oak leaf clusters	Navy Unit Commendation w/ 1 service star
5th row	Navy Meritorious Unit Commendation w/ 3 service stars	Presidential Medal of Freedom (non-military award)	National Defense Service Medal w/ 2 service stars	Armed Forces Expeditionary Medal w/ 2 service stars
6th row	Vietnam Service Medal w/ 6 service stars	Global War on Terrorism Service Medal	Korea Defense Service Medal	Humanitarian Service Medal
7th row	Sea Service Deployment Ribbon w/ 2 service stars	Overseas Service Ribbon w/ 3 service stars	Marine Corps Recruiting Ribbon	Order of National Security Merit, Tong-il Medal
8th row	1st Class Order of the Rising Sun, Grand Cordon	Order of the Sacred Treasure	Order of Naval Merit Admiral Padilla, Grand Cross	Meritorious Service Cross
9th row	Vietnam Gallantry Cross Unit Citation	Vietnam Civil Actions Unit Citation	United Nations Medal w/ 1 service star	Vietnam Campaign Medal
Badges	Rifle Expert Badge		Pistol Expert Badge	
Badge	Office of the Joint Chiefs of Staff Identification Badge			

=== Non-military awards ===
- In October 2004, Pace received the Keeper of the Flame Award by the Center for Security Policy.
- In October 2005, Pace accepted the National Italian American Foundation's (NIAF) Special Achievement Award for Military Service.
- Pace was awarded the 2005 Henry M. Jackson Distinguished Service Award from the Jewish Institute for National Security Affairs (JINSA).
- During the 2006 Congressional Medal of Honor Society meeting, Gen. Pace was awarded the society's Patriot Award, which is presented annually to a "distinguished American who has exemplified the ideals that make this country strong. Their dedication to freedom, their love for fellow man, their allegiance to our flag and a full understanding of its demands, accepted without reservation".
- In April 2006, the John Carroll Society honored him with the John Carroll Medal.
- In October 2006, Georgetown University honors Pace with its President's Medal.
- In June 2007, Pace received the Golden Plate Award of the American Academy of Achievement presented by Awards Council member and U.S. Secretary of Defense Robert Gates.
- Pace received the Global Service Award from the World Affairs Council.
- Pace received the Presidential Medal of Freedom on June 19, 2008.
- Pace was recognized as a Distinguished Graduate of the United States Naval Academy on March 6, 2009, at the Naval Academy's 11th annual Distinguished Graduate Award Medal Ceremony.

== See also ==
- List of United States Marine Corps four-star generals
- List of historically important U.S. Marines

== Notes ==
Military offices
Preceded by Charles E. Wilhelm	Commanding General of Fleet Marine Force, Atlantic; Commander of Marine Corps Forces Atlantic, Europe, and South; 1997–2000	Succeeded by Raymond P. Ayres
Preceded by Charles E. Wilhelm	Commander of United States Southern Command; 2000–2001	Succeeded by James T. Hill
Preceded by Richard Myers	Vice Chairman of the Joint Chiefs of Staff; 2001–2005	Succeeded by Edmund Giambastiani
Preceded by Richard Myers	Chairman of the Joint Chiefs of Staff; 2005–2007	Succeeded by Michael Mullen
U.S. order of precedence (ceremonial)
Preceded by Richard Myers as former Chair of the Joint Chiefs of Staff	Order of precedence of the United States as former Chair of the Joint Chiefs of Staff	Succeeded by Michael Mullen as former Chair of the Joint Chiefs of Staff
