= Drexel Hamilton =

American investment banking firm

Drexel Hamilton, LLC

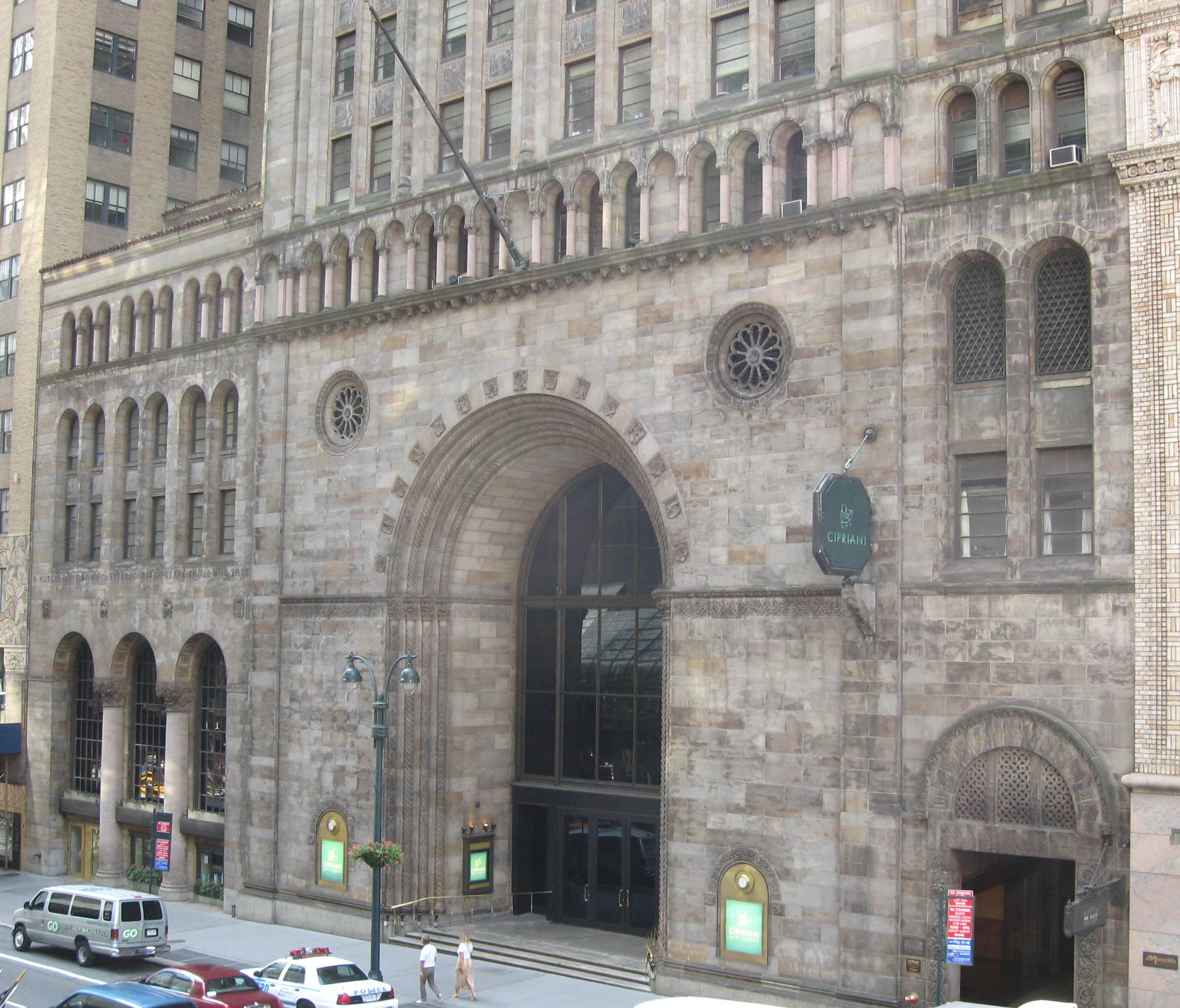
- Headquarters at 110 East 42nd Street
- Company type: Private
- Industry: Investment Banking
- Founded: 2007; 19 years ago
- Founder: Lawrence Doll
- Headquarters: 110 East 42nd Street New York City, New York, U.S.
- Website: www.drexelhamilton.com

Drexel Hamilton is an investment banking firm based in New York City that is fully owned and operated by military veterans. The firm aims to give military veterans employment opportunities in the field of finance. It claims that sixty percent of its workforce are military veterans.

== Background ==
Drexel Hamilton was founded in 2007 by Lawrence Doll with the aim of giving employment opportunities to military veterans who had difficulties finding them in civilian life. Doll was a disabled veteran who served in the United States Marine Corps during the Vietnam War and is a two-time Purple Heart recipient. Doll later became a commercial real estate executive and used his own money to found Drexel Hamilton. The name of the firm comes from Anthony Joseph Drexel and Alexander Hamilton.

The start was initially difficult, but Doll met James Cahill for lunch in New York and hired him on the spot which eventually helped improve business. Cahill, who at the time was retired, previously worked at Salomon Brothers, Lehman Brothers and Keefe, Bruyette & Woods. The firm was able to bring in several senior executives from other financial institutions which allowed the firm to work on major deals.

In 2011, the firm received its Financial Industry Regulatory Authority license which allowed it to sell municipal bonds.

James Cahill was the firm's president and CEO until 2017 when he retired and was succeeded by Anthony Felice.

At the start of 2018, ownership of the firm changed as Doll sold most of the company to long term employees of the firm. Some operations were overhauled.

In several states and cities, Drexel Hamilton is designated as a minority business enterprise which allows it to compete for contracts awarded publicly by the state or city.

== Veterans training program ==
The firm offers a training program to help military veterans prepare for careers in finance. Twenty percent of its expenses goes towards providing housing and training to veterans. Once veterans pass the regulatory exams such as the Series 7 exam, they interview for jobs at other financial institutions such as Goldman Sachs or JPMorgan Chase. If they cannot find work in other places suited to their abilities, they are hired by Drexel Hamilton.

Doll is also a co-founder of the Wall Street Warfighters Foundation, a nonprofit group that finds candidates for banking careers and subsidizes a portion of their training at Drexel Hamilton. Costs not covered by Drexel Hamilton will be covered either by donations from institutions or by the individuals themselves. Eligible candidates are veterans that have passed background checks, completed their military obligations, received an honorable discharge and have demonstrated an interest in finance. Foundation official travel to military hospitals to interview candidates. Those selected spend six-month at Drexel Hamilton studying and training. Former United States Marine Corps general, Peter Pace serves as Head of the foundation.
