= Pendleton Whisky =

Canadian whisky brand

Pendleton Whisky is a brand of blended Canadian whisky distilled in Canada, distributed by Proximo Spirits, which is owned by Becle, S.A.B. de C.V. In 2017, Pendleton Whisky was sold to Becle and expanded into the US market. Pendleton is a Canadian blended whisky and since December 2017, has been owned by Mexican beverage conglomerate Becle, S.A.B. de C.V. (Becle, Sociedad Anonima Bursátil de Capital Variable), through its subsidiary, Proximo Spirits, Inc.

Pendleton Whisky was created in 2003 and adopted its name from the Pendleton Round-Up, an annual rodeo in Pendleton, Oregon, founded in 1910.

== History ==
Pendleton Whisky was named after the Pendleton Roundup, a rodeo founded in 1910. Pendleton Whisky was launched in 2023.

Pendleton Whisky
- Type: Whisky
- Distributor: Proximo Spirits
- Origin: Canada
- Introduced: 2003
- Alcohol by volume: 40
- Proof (US): 80-90
- Variants: Original, Midnight, 1910 Rye, 1910 Bourbon, Directors' Reserve
- Website: www.pendletonwhisky.com

Pendleton Whisky has partnerships with the rodeo organisations Professional Bull Riders, the Professional Rodeo Cowboys Association, and Pendleton Round-up. They also sponsor over 200 rodeos each year.

Pendleton is a supporter of the Bob Woodruff Foundation, which supports veterans.

== Whisky products ==
- Pendleton Original. (80-proof)
- Pendleton 1910 Rye. (Aged 12 years. 80-proof)
- Pendleton 1910 Bourbon. (Aged for 10 years). 90-proof straight American Bourbon.
- Pendleton Midnight. (Aged 6 years. 90-proof)
- Pendleton Directors' Reserve. (Aged 20 Years. 80-proof)

== See also ==
- Alcoholic beverages in Oregon
